= Millennium Link =

Coordinates: 56°0′0″N 3°50′26″W

The Millennium Link is one of the biggest engineering projects ever undertaken by British Waterways. The Union Canal and the Forth & Clyde Canal were originally joined by a flight of locks. The Millennium Link project replaced the locks with a boat lift, the Falkirk Wheel.

The project launch was in October 1994, and it received a grant of £32 million from the Millennium Commission; the total cost of the project was £78 million.

Work started in 1999.

== Partners in the Millennium Link project ==
- City of Edinburgh Council
- East Dunbartonshire Council
- Falkirk Council
- Glasgow City Council
- North Lanarkshire Council
- West Dunbartonshire Council
- West Lothian Council
- Millennium Commission
- Millennium Forest for Scotland
- British Waterways
- Scottish Natural Heritage
- Central Scotland Countryside Trust
- East of Scotland European Partnership
- Strathclyde European Partnership
- Scottish Enterprise
- Edinburgh Canal Society
- Ratho Union Canal Society Association - now defunct
- Falkirk and District Canal Society based at Camelon, Falkirk
- Paisley Canal and Waterways Society
- Scottish Inland Waterways Association
- Forth and Clyde Canal Society
- Linlithgow Union Canal Society
- Seagull Trust
- List of waterway societies in the United Kingdom

== See also ==
- Canals of the United Kingdom
- History of the British canal system
- The Helix (Falkirk)
