= Nancy Oldfield Trust =

Charity providing access to boating in Norfolk, United Kingdom

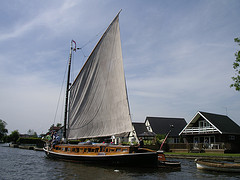

The Nancy Oldfield Trust is a waterway society, a charitable trust and a registered charity no. 1068549 in Norfolk, East Anglia, England, UK.

The Trust is based at Neatishead on the Norfolk Broads and provides boating opportunities and water-based activities for disabled and disadvantaged people from anywhere in the United Kingdom. It was founded in 1984 by Richard Kenyon in memory of his parents.

The Trust operates three motor cruisers, one of them electric, seven sailing yachts, and several canoes. The motor boats have wheelchair lifts, and hoists are available for all other boats.

There is also a residential centre, and "The Ark", a floating pontoon base on Barton Broad. Visitors can fish during the season, and many enjoy bird watching whilst on the boats.

The Trust offers courses and activities, run by Royal Yachting Association trained staff and 40 volunteers.

The Trust is a RYA Training Centre, and runs training courses in sailing throughout the year, which lead to RYA qualifications.

== See also ==
- List of waterway societies in the United Kingdom

Boating charities for disabled persons:

- Seagull Trust
- Peter Le Marchant Trust
- Royal Yachting Association
- Broads Authority
- Inland Waterways Association
