= List of waterway societies in the United Kingdom =

This List of waterway societies in the United Kingdom is a list of links to waterway societies, charities, trusts, associations, clubs and other non-governmental waterway organisations, concerned with the restoration, regeneration and use of the waterways in the United Kingdom.

== A ==
- Airedale Boat Club, Yorkshire
- Anderton Boat Lift Trust
- Anglers Conservation Association
- Ashby Canal Association, Leicestershire, Staffordshire
- Ashby Canal Trust, Leicestershire, Staffordshire
- Association of Nene River Clubs
- Association of Rivers Trusts
- Association of Waterways Cruising Clubs
- Aylesbury Canal Society, Buckinghamshire

== B ==
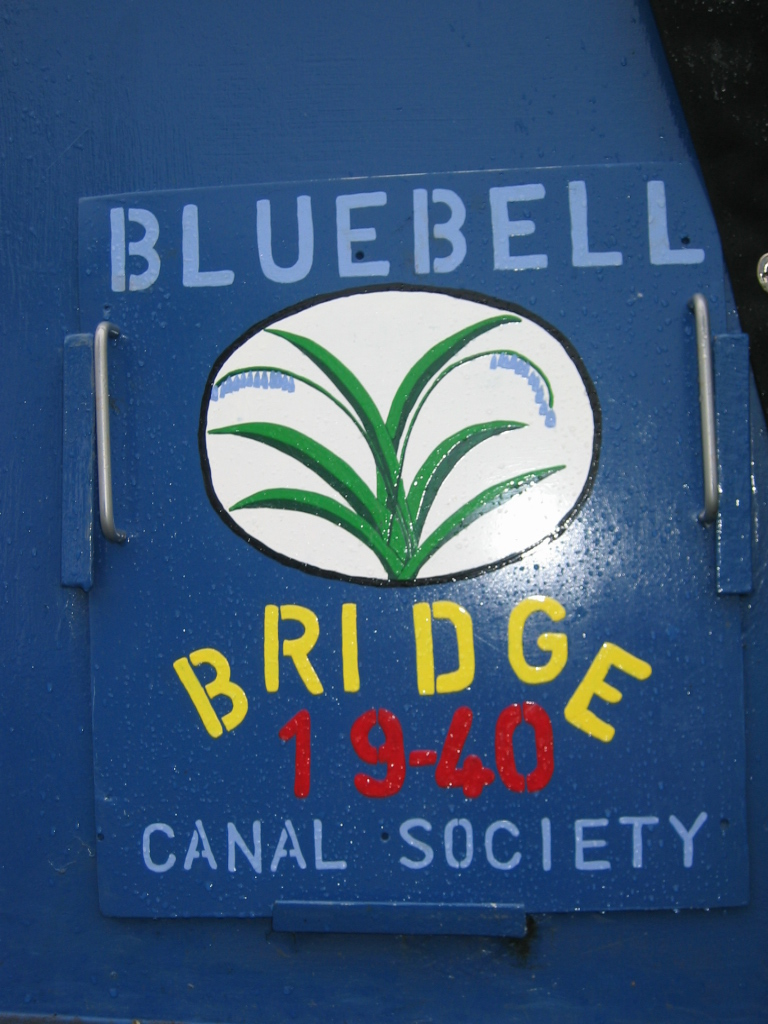
Tripboat "Bluebell", Bridge 19-40 Canal Society, West Lothian

- Barge Association (DBA)
- Bedford and Milton Keynes Waterway Trust
- Birmingham Canal Navigations Society
- Bridge 19-40 Canal Society, Scotland
- British Canoe Union (BCU)
- Broads Society, Norfolk, Suffolk
- Burslem Port Trust - for the restoration of the Burslem arm of the Trent & Mersey Canal.

== C ==
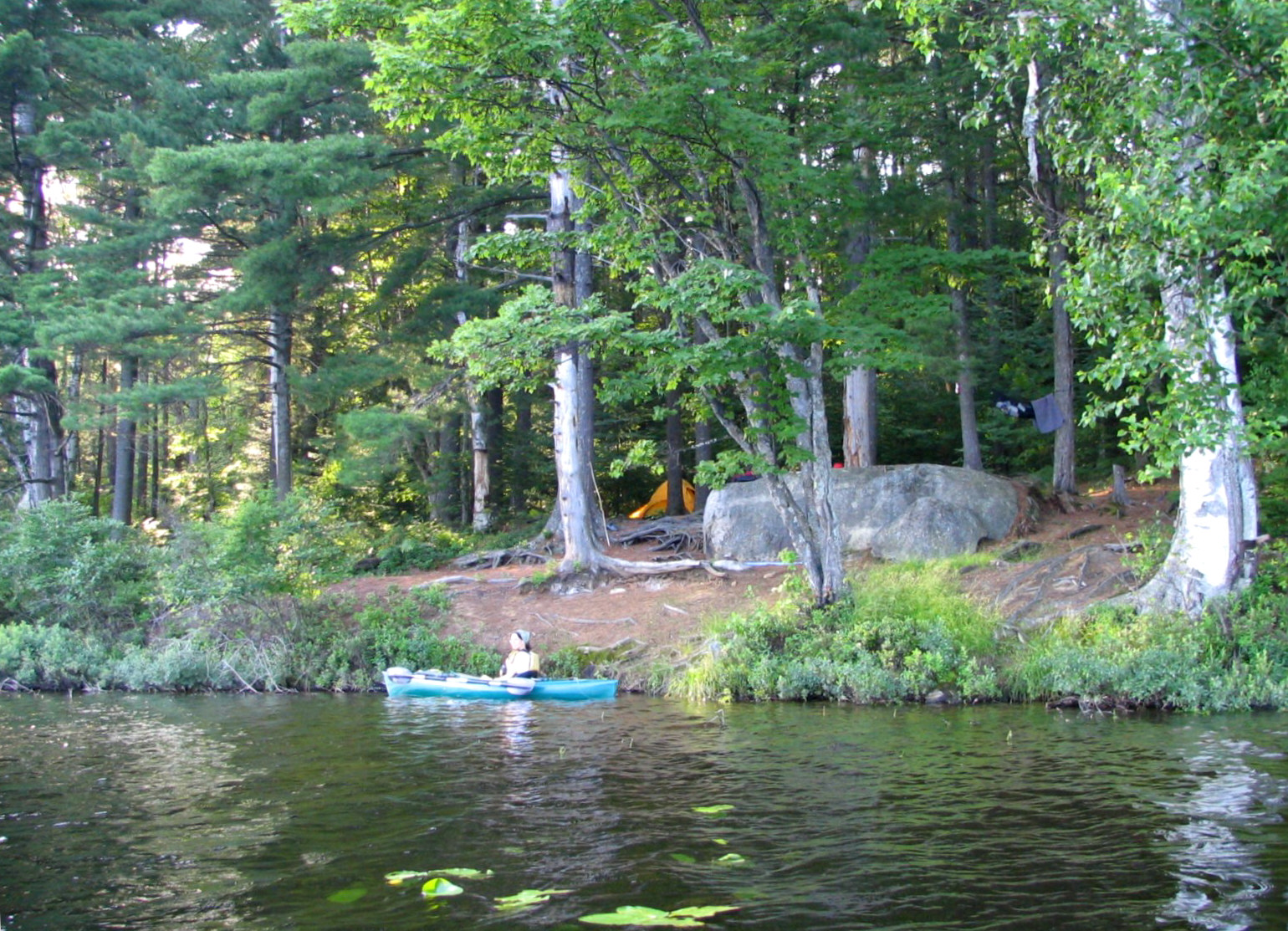
Canoe clubs

- Chester Canal Heritage Trust
- Chesterfield Canal Trust, Derbyshire
- Friends of the Cromford Canal
- Cotswold Canals Trust

== D ==
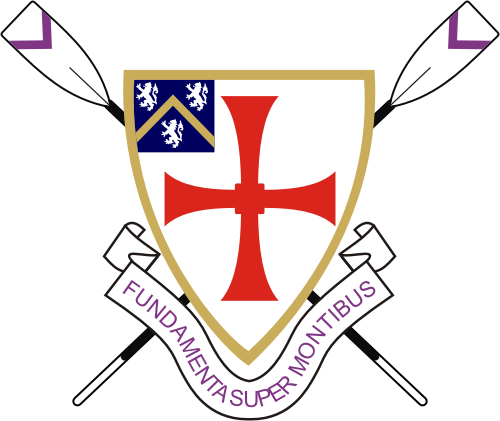
Durham College Rowing represents the sixteen college boat clubs of Durham University.

- Derby and Sandiacre Canal Trust, Derbyshire
- Disabled Sailors Association, Disability
- Dittons Skiff and Punting Club
- Droitwich Canals Trust, Worcestershire
- Durham College Rowing
- Durham University Boat Club

== E ==
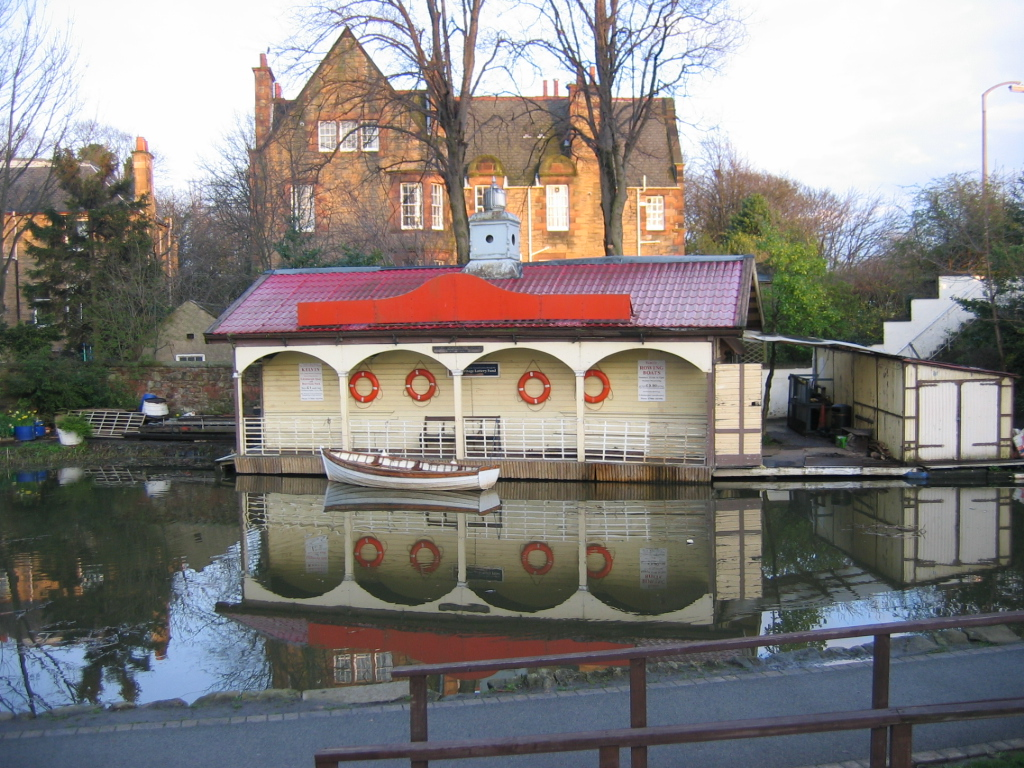
Edinburgh Canal Society boathouse on the Union Canal

- East Anglian Waterways Association
- Edinburgh Canal Society, Scotland
- Edinburgh University Boat Club
- Electric Boat Association
- English Federation of Disability Sport, Disability
- Erewash Canal Preservation and Development Association

== F ==
- Forth Canoe Club, Scotland
- Forth and Clyde Canal Society, Scotland
- Foxton Inclined Plane Trust, Leicestershire
- Friends of the Cromford Canal

== G ==
- Glasgow University Boat Club
- The Grantham Canal Society
- Great Ouse Boating Association (GOBA), Bedfordshire

== H ==
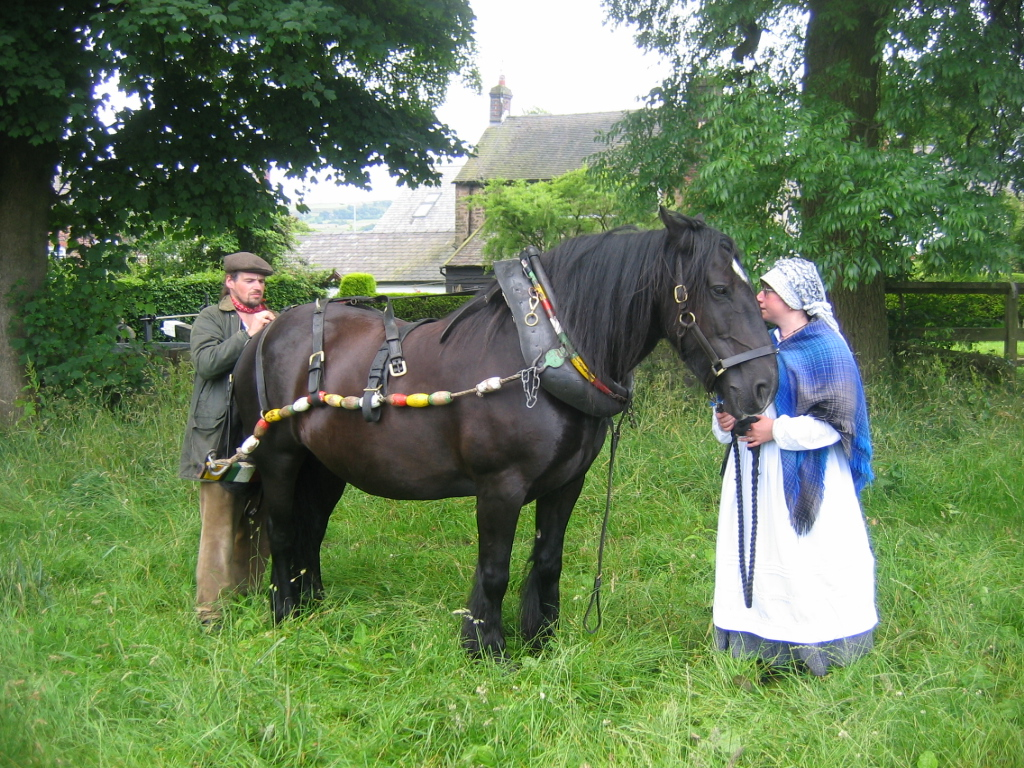
Boathorse "Queenie" of the Horseboating Society

- Herefordshire and Gloucestershire Canal Trust
- Horseboating Society

== I ==
- Inland Waterways Association (IWA), covers England and Wales
- Inland Waterways Association of Ireland (IWAI), covers the Republic of Ireland and Northern Ireland
- Inland Waterways Protection Society

== J ==
- Jesus College Boat Club (Cambridge)
- Jesus College Boat Club (Oxford)

== K ==
- Kennet and Avon Canal Trust, Wiltshire
- Kingston Royals Dragon Boat Racing Club

== L ==
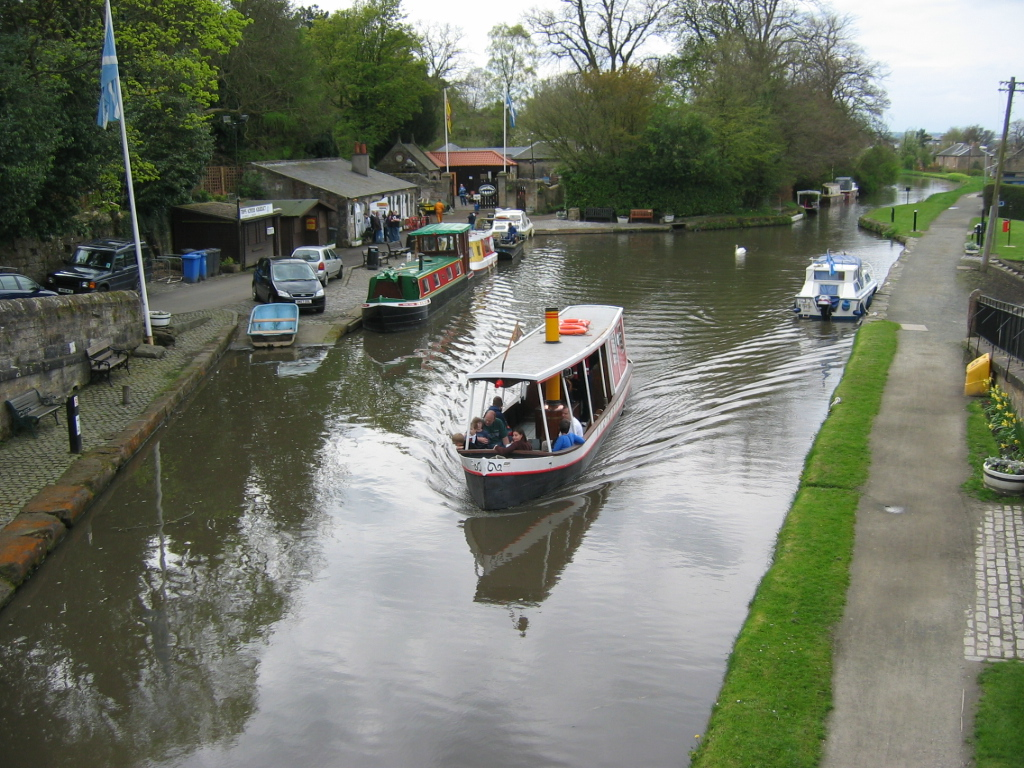
Linlithgow Union Canal Society tripboats

- Lancaster Canal Trust, Lancashire, Cumbria
- Leeds and Liverpool Canal Society, Lancashire, Yorkshire
- Linlithgow Union Canal Society (LUCS), Scotland
- Llandaff Rowing Club, Wales

== M ==
- Manchester Bolton and Bury Canal Society (MBBC), Greater Manchester
- Manchester Canoe Club
- Marine Conservation Society
- Mariners of Bewl, Kent / Disability
- Melton and Oakham Waterways Society
- Mersey Basin Campaign
- Monmouthshire, Brecon & Abergavenny Canals Trust (MBACT), Wales
- Montgomery Waterway Restoration Trust, Shropshire

== N ==
- Nancy Oldfield Trust, Norfolk Broads / Disability
- National Association of Boat Owners (NABO)
- National Community Boats Association (NCBA)
- Norfolk Heritage Fleet Trust
- Norfolk Wherry Trust
- Northern Reaches Restoration Group, Lancashire, Cumbria
- Nottingham Rowing Club
- Nottingham University Boat Club

== P ==
- Peter Le Marchant Trust, Leicestershire / Disability
- Pocklington Canal Amenity Society

== R ==
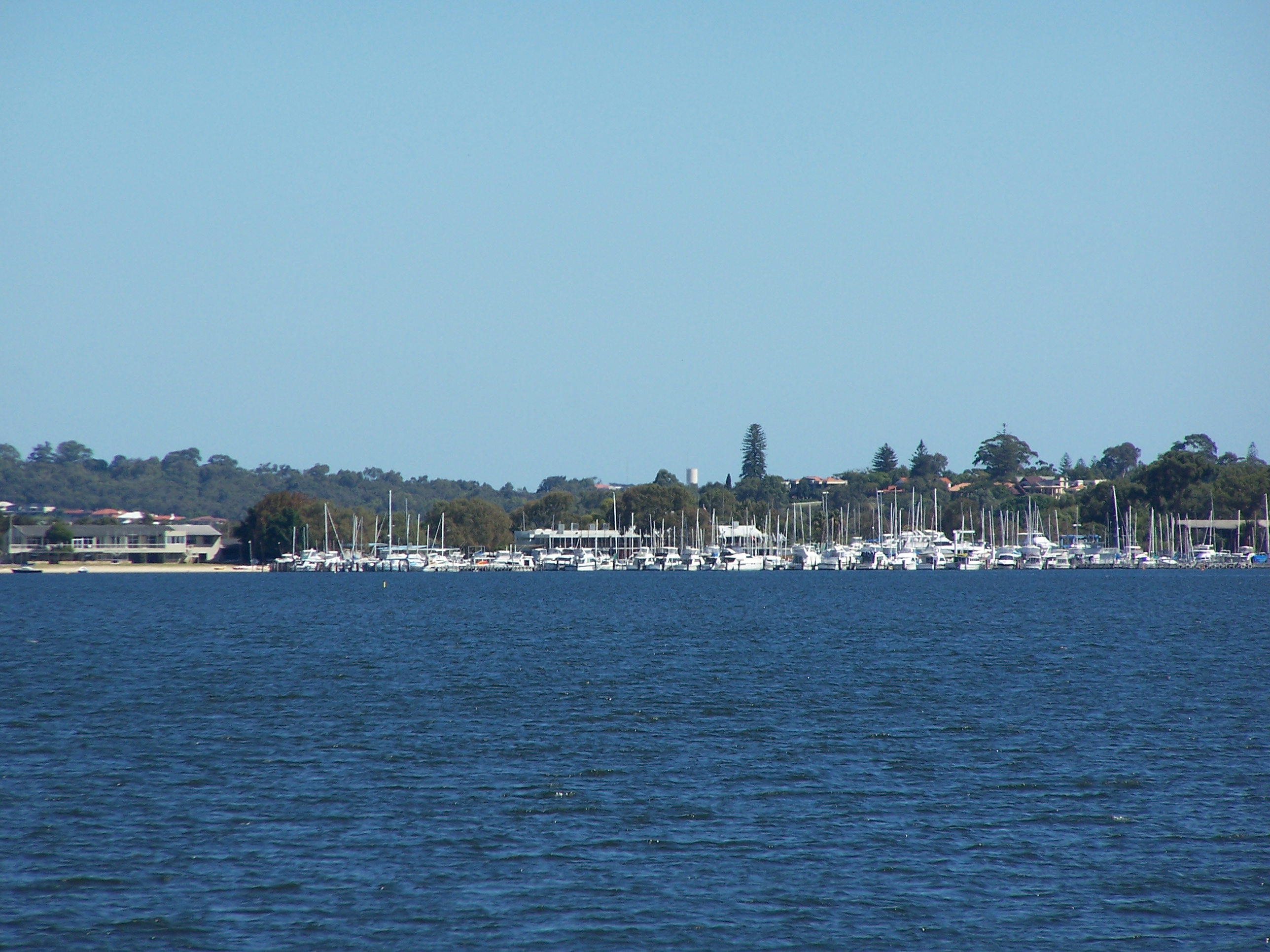
Royal Perth Yacht Club, Scotland

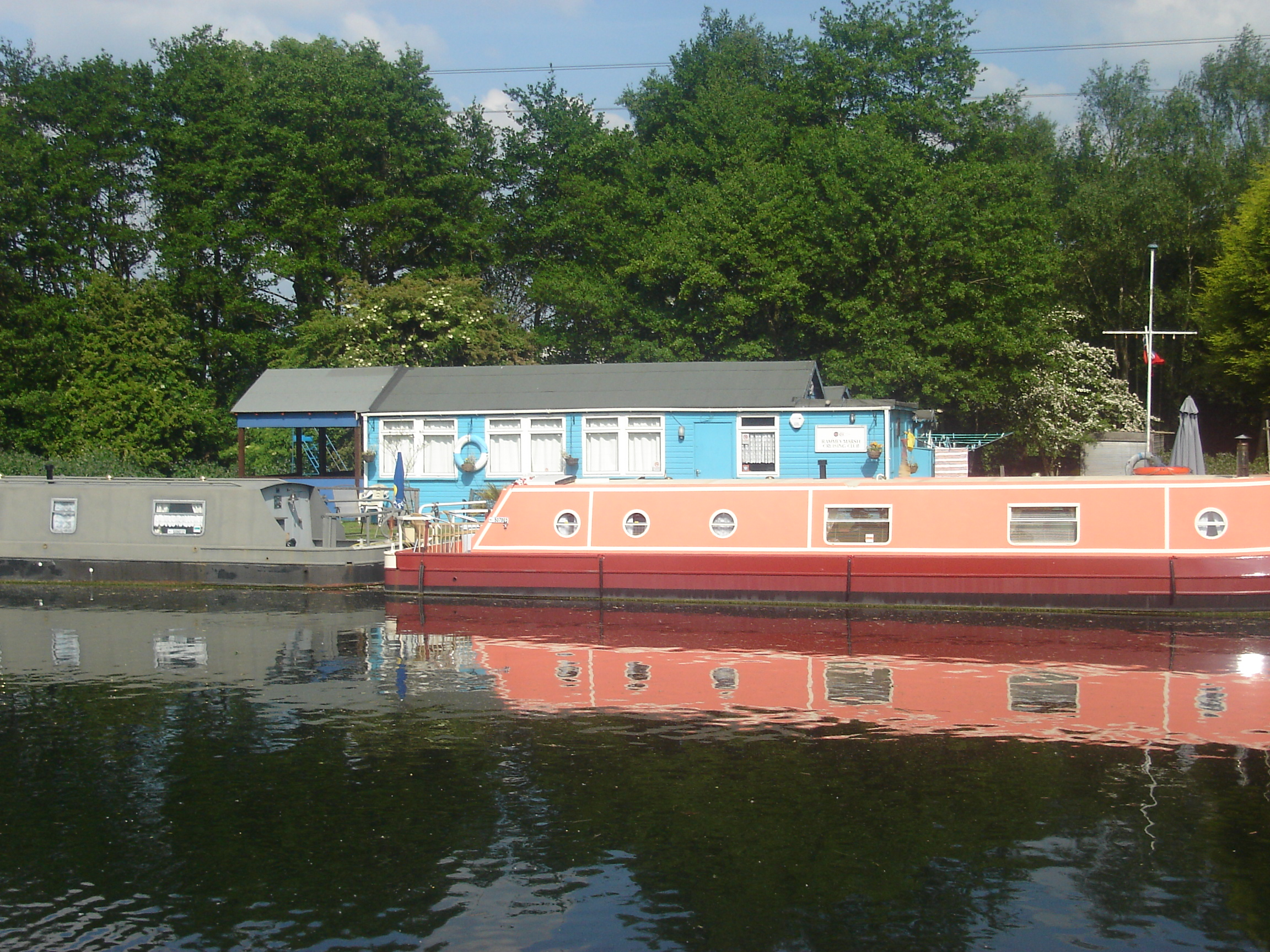
Rammey Marsh Cruising Club

- Railway and Canal Historical Society
- Ribble Link Trust, Lancashire
- River Stour Trust
- River Weaver Navigation Society
- Rivers and Fisheries Trusts of Scotland, Scotland
- Royal Canoe Club
- Royal Perth Yacht Club
- Royal Yachting Association (RYA)

== S ==
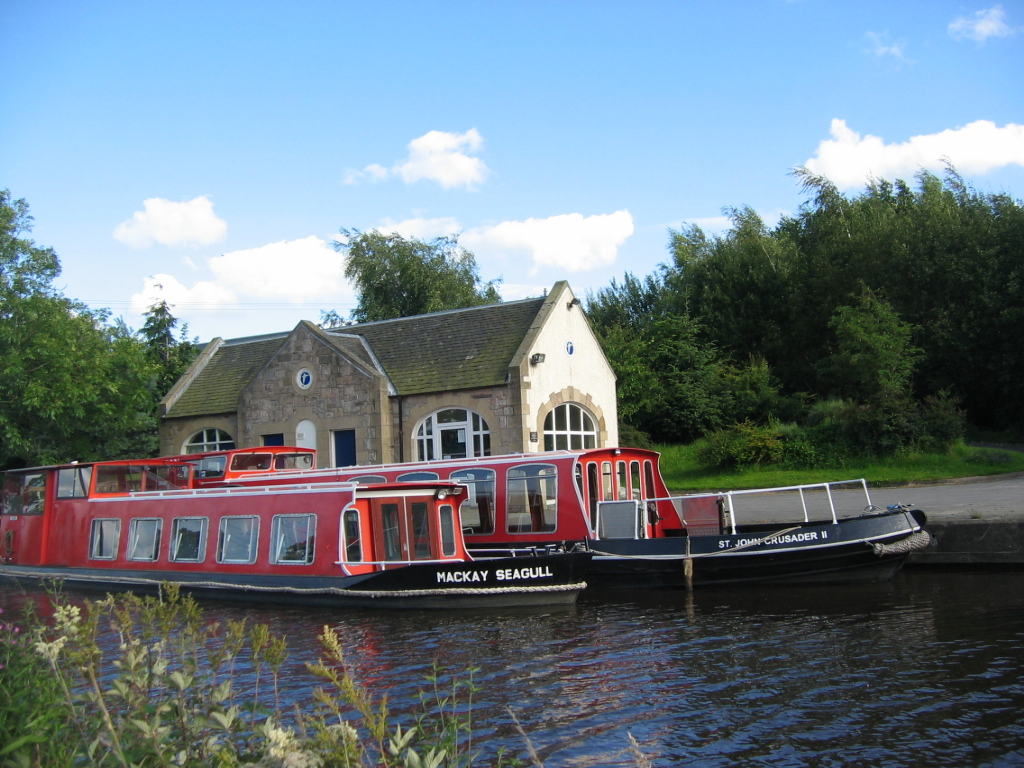
Seagull Trust at Ratho

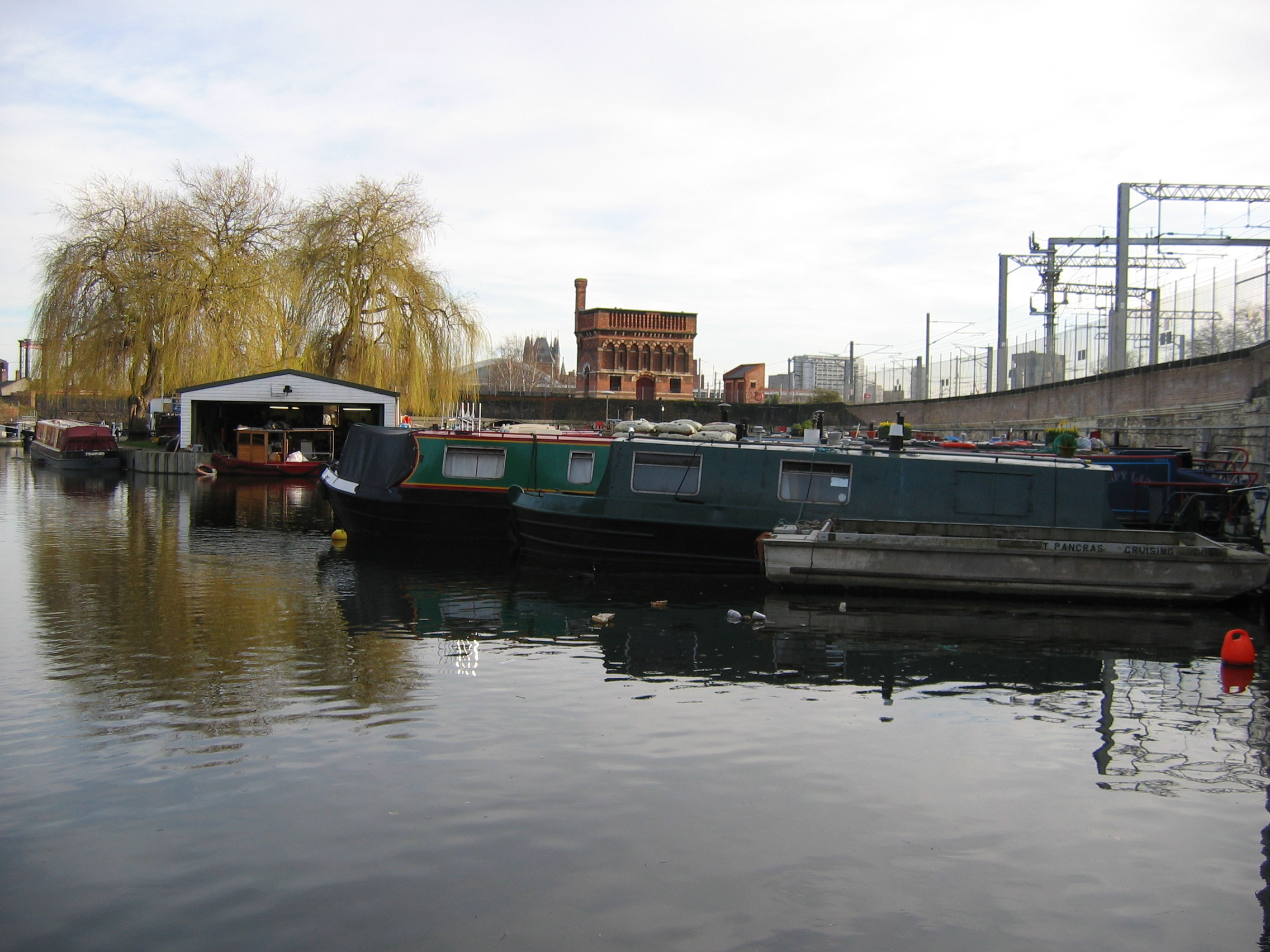
St. Pancras Cruising Club

- Scottish Amateur Rowing Association
- Scottish Inland Waterways Association (SIWA), Scotland (now dissolved)
- Scottish Waterways Trust
- Seagull Trust, Scotland / Disability
- Shrewsbury & Newport Canals Trust
- Shropshire Union Canal Society Ltd.
- Steam Boat Association of Great Britain
- St Pancras Cruising Club, London

== T ==
- Thames Valley Skiff Club
- The Skiff Club
- Towpath Action Group (TAG)

== U ==
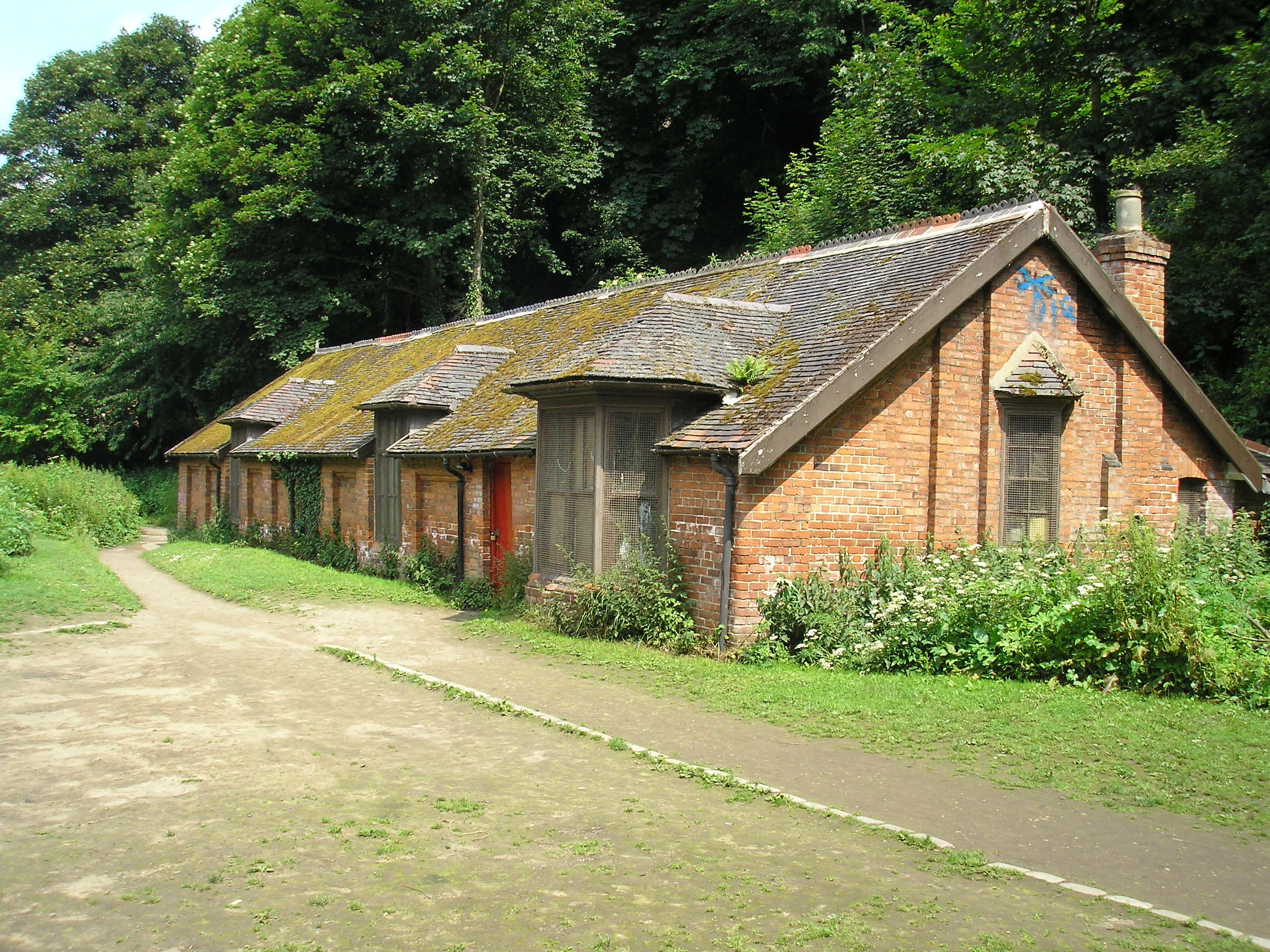
University College Boathouse on the River Wear in Durham has been in use for more than 120 years.

- University College Boat Club (Durham)
- University College London Boat Club
- University of London Boat Club

== W ==
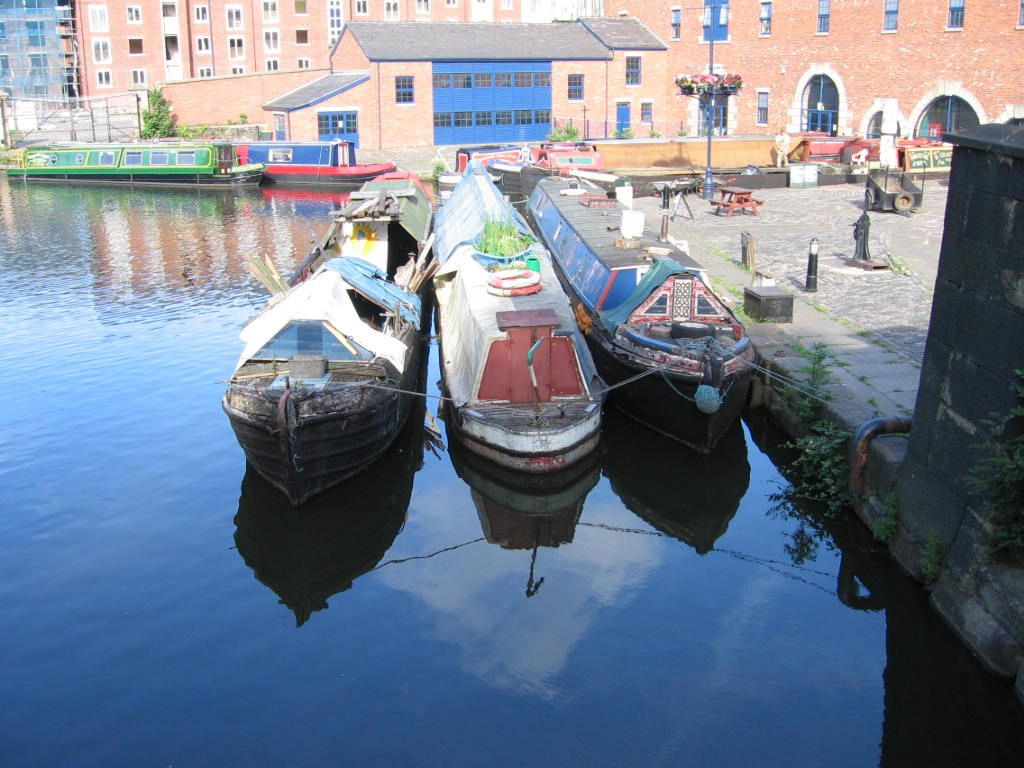
Wooden Canal Boat Society at Portland Basin, Ashton Canal

- Waterway Recovery Group
- The Waterways Trust
- Welsh Amateur Rowing Association
- Wendover Arm Trust
- Westcountry Rivers Trust
- Wey and Arun Canal Trust
- Weymouth and Portland National Sailing Academy
- Wherry Yacht Charter Charitable Trust, Norfolk
- Whitchurch Waterway Trust
- Wilts & Berks Canal Trust
- Wooden Canal Boat Society, Greater Manchester
- Wraysbury Skiff and Punting Club

== Y ==
- York St John University Rowing Club

== See also ==
- Waterway society, Waterway restoration
- Waterways in the United Kingdom
- List of navigation authorities in the United Kingdom
- List of rivers of England
- List of rivers of Scotland
- List of rivers of Wales
- List of rivers of Ireland
- Canals of Great Britain
- Canals of Ireland
- History of the British canal system
