= Leeds and Liverpool Canal Society =

The Leeds and Liverpool Canal Society is a waterway society on the Leeds and Liverpool Canal in Lancashire and Yorkshire, England. The society was formed to help promote the canal, and to encourage greater appreciation and understanding of its history and environment.

== See also ==
- List of waterway societies in the United Kingdom
- Airedale Boat Club
