= Lancaster Canal Trust =

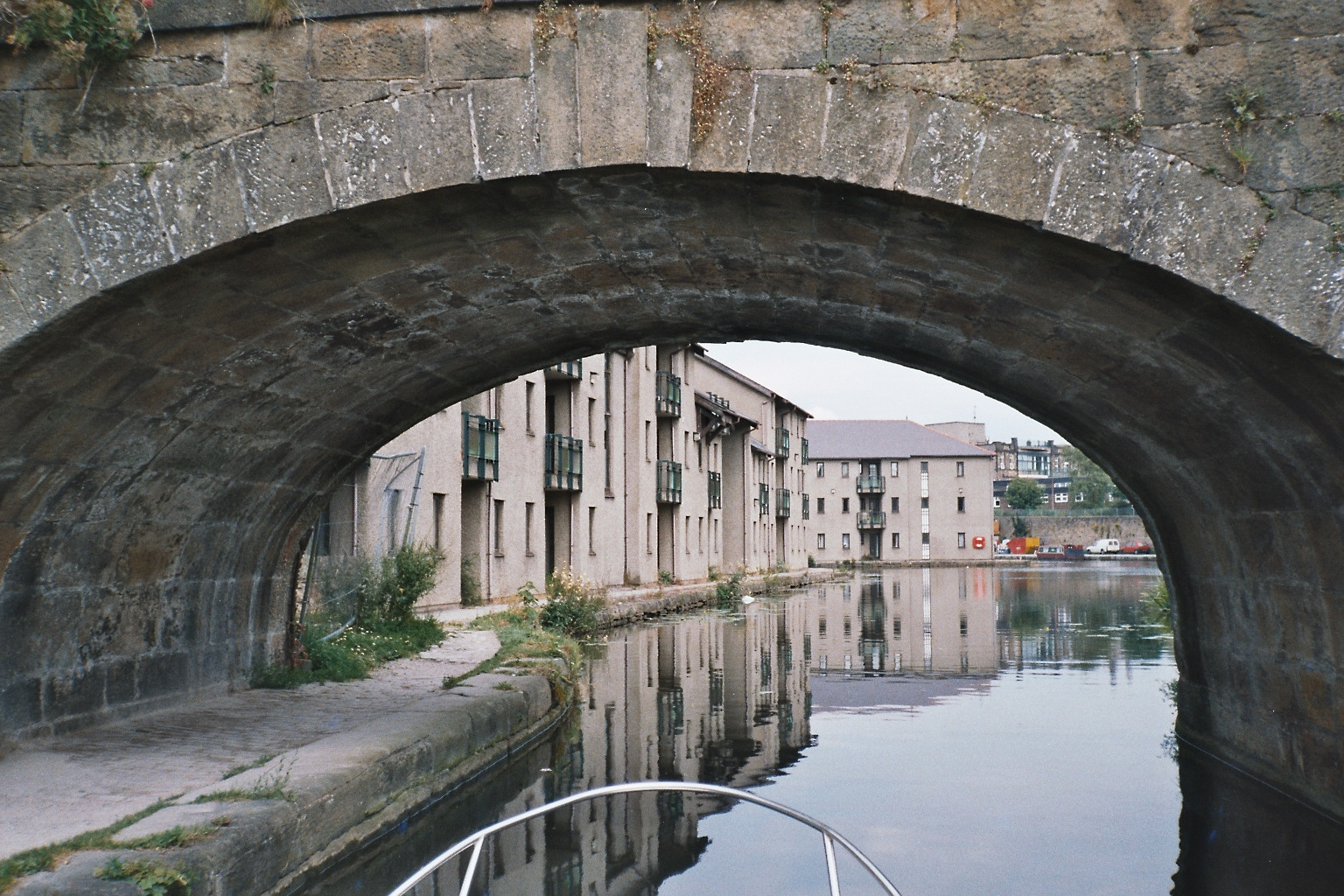
The "Lanky" at Lancaster

The Lancaster Canal Trust is a waterway society and a registered charity on the Lancaster Canal in Lancashire and Cumbria, England.

It was formed in 1963 as the Association for the Restoration of the Lancaster Canal, and its main aim is the restoration and reopening for navigation of the stretch between Tewitfield Locks, north of Carnforth, and Kendal.

The Trust also aims to protect the essential character of the canal, but at the same time to develop the canal as a public amenity. It operates the tripboat "Waterwitch", a traditional 28 ft narrowboat cruising between Crooklands (Bridge 166) and Stainton. Waterwitch operates on Sundays and Bank Holidays from May to September inclusive. Trips last approximately 40 minutes, charges are £4 for Adults and £1 for Children (2025) Landing stage is opposite the Crooklands Hotel postcode LA7 7NW.

The Trust is affiliated to the Inland Waterways Association and works in conjunction with British Waterways, local authorities, county councils, and other canal users.

== See also ==
- List of waterway societies in the United Kingdom
- Northern Reaches Restoration Group
- Preston City Link Canal Trust
- Ribble Link Trust
