= Linlithgow Union Canal Society =

Waterway society in West Lothian, Scotland

Coordinates: 55.9749°N 3.5982°W

Linlithgow Union Canal Centre
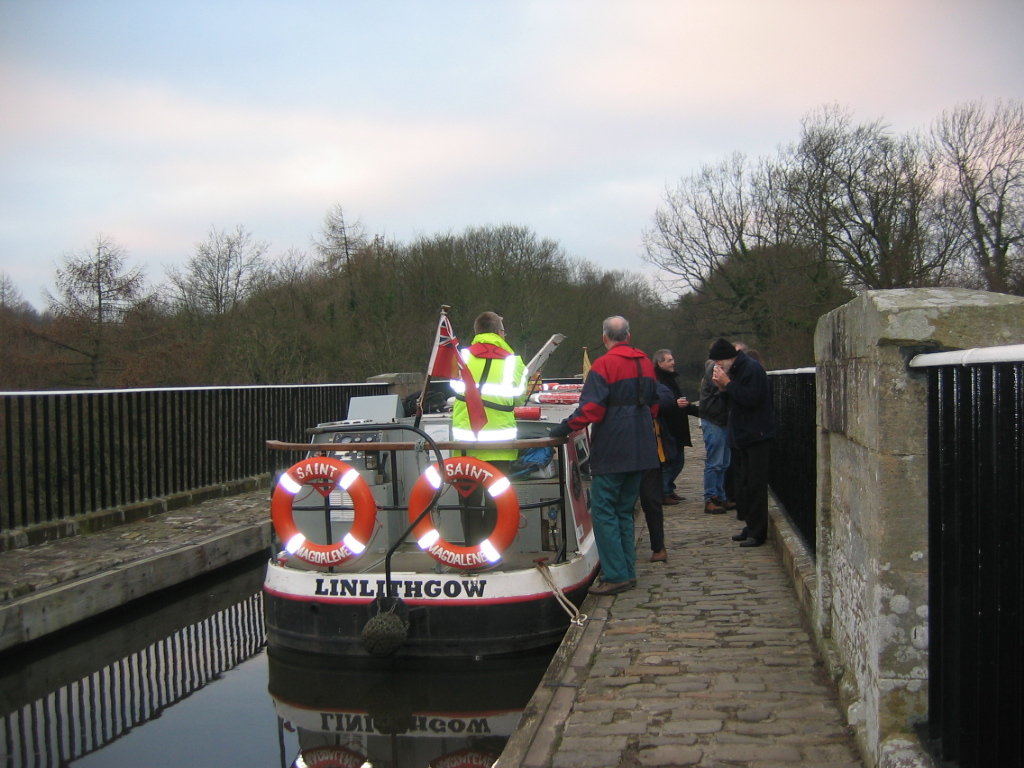
- Established: 1977
- Location: Linlithgow

The Linlithgow Union Canal Society is a waterway society and a Scottish registered charity based at Linlithgow Canal Centre on the Union Canal at Linlithgow, West Lothian, Scotland. Also known as "LUCS", it was founded in 1975 by Melville Gray to "promote and encourage the restoration and use of the Union Canal, particularly in the vicinity of Linlithgow".

== History ==
From 1970, Mel Gray had started to clear the towpath with the help of boys from HMYOI Polmont, a Young Offenders Institution. This was followed by the first boaters' Rally at Linlithgow Canal Centre, organised by the Scottish Inland Waterways Association and the Scottish Civic Trust in 1972. In 1975 the Society acquired an old dredger from the (then) British Waterways Board, now Scottish Canals.

In the Seventies and Eighties, other canal societies began to be formed on the Union Canal and the Forth & Clyde Canal, including Edinburgh Canal Society, Forth Canoe Club, Bridge 19-40 Canal Society and others. Persistent campaigning resulted in the restoration of the Scottish Lowland canals through the Millennium Link Project of which Linlithgow Union Canal Society was an official Partner. The Link connects the Union and Forth & Clyde canals by way of the unique Falkirk Wheel boat lift.

Linlithgow Union Canal Society hosted a Scottish Inland Waterways Association (SIWA) Rally in 2008, and it participates in the annual Linlithgow Folk Festival.

Mel Gray, the founder, died in March 2006 .

== Linlithgow Canal Centre ==
The Society administers the Linlithgow Canal Centre and operates boat trips, a tearoom and the new Mel Gray Education Centre. Provision for schools includes boat trips to teach children water safety and other related topics, and the Education Centre is able to cater for all age groups.

Further boats were purchased in 1987 and 1995 and are taking visitors to Linlithgow or the Avon Aqueduct; constructed by Hugh Baird with advice from Thomas Telford, it is the second longest aqueduct in the UK and the longest and highest in Scotland. The trip boat "Saint Magdalene" is named after the St Magdalene distillery.

The Canal Museum was created in 1977. It had started life as a stable for the boat horses and is now a resource centre for the study of the history of the UK canal system.

== Photo gallery ==
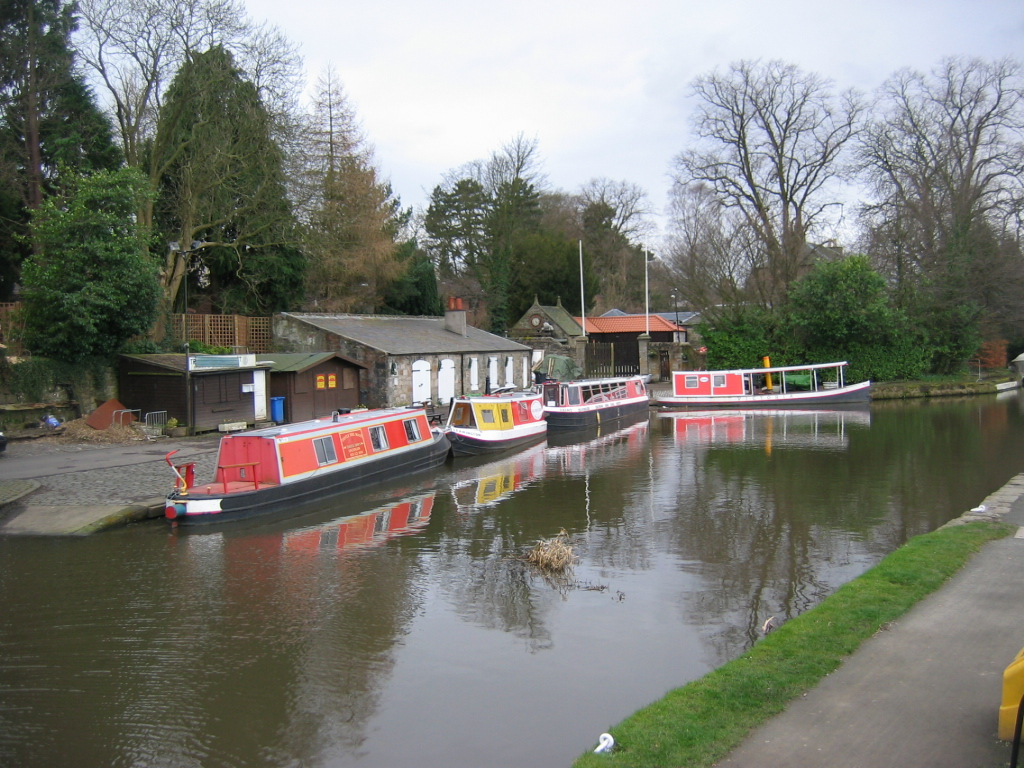

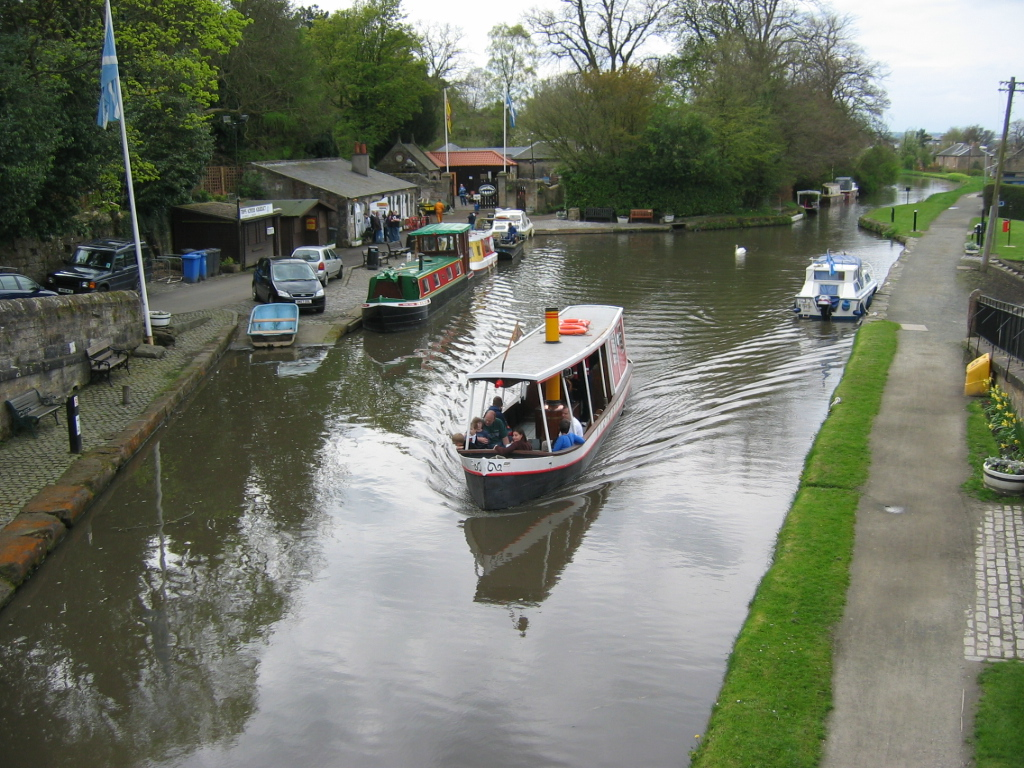

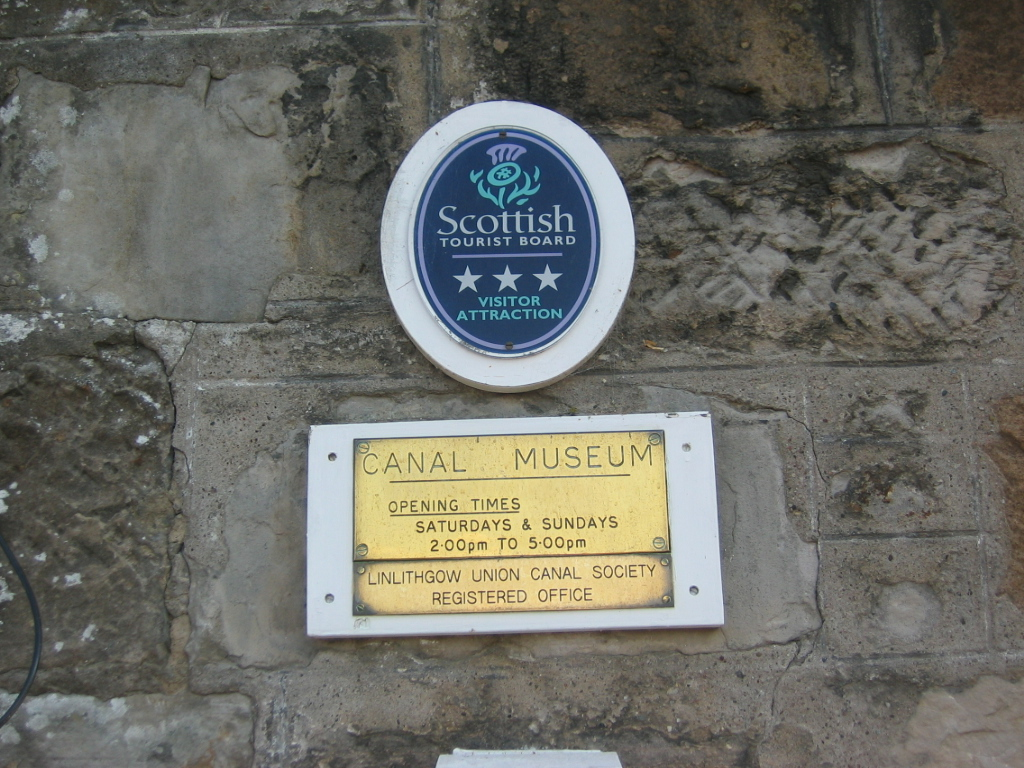
Tourist Board plaque

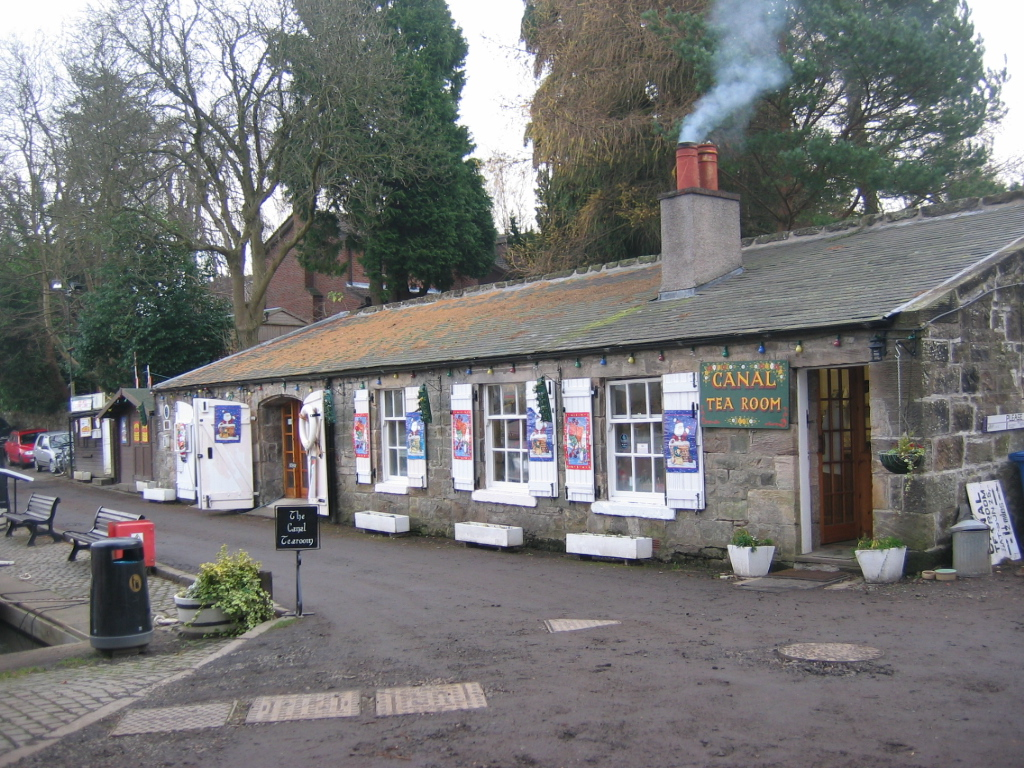

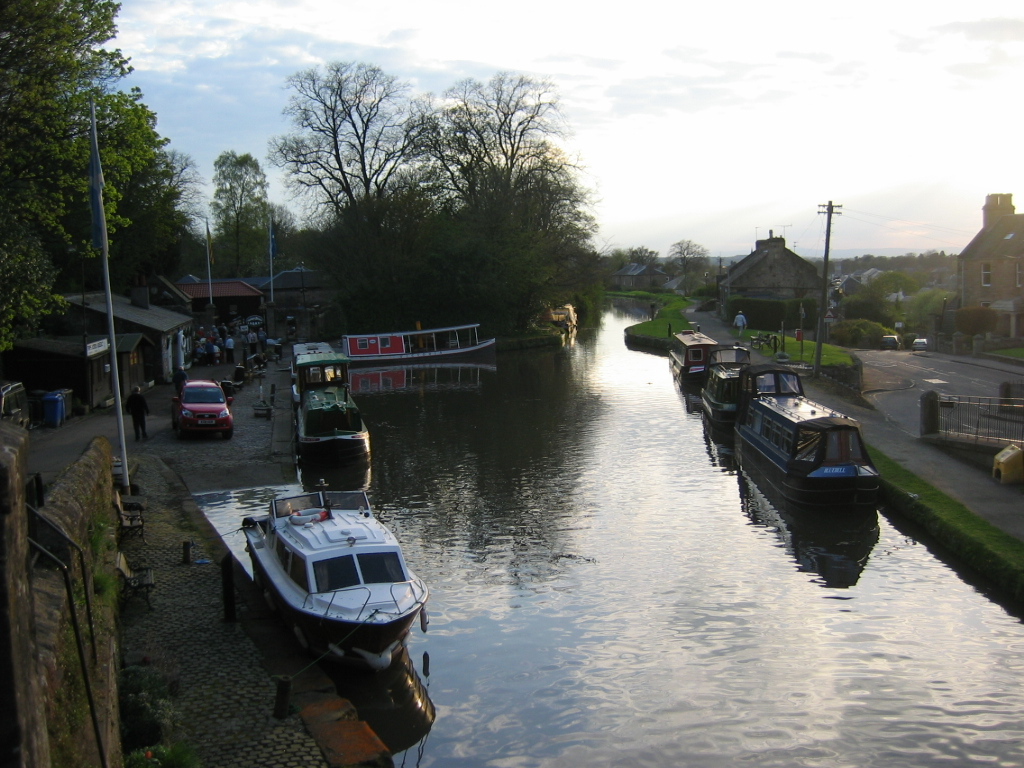

== See also ==
- List of waterway societies in the United Kingdom
