= Campaign for National Parks =

UK charity organisation

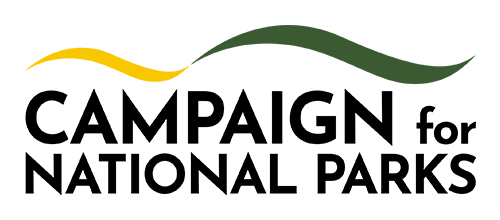
- Campaign for National Parks logo
- Abbreviation: CNP
- Formation: 1936
- Type: Charity
- Registration no.: 295336
- Region served: England and Wales
- Website: www.cnp.org.uk
- Formerly called: Standing Committee on National Parks, Council for National Parks

The Campaign for National Parks (CNP), formerly the Council for National Parks and the Standing Committee on National Parks, is an independent UK registered charity that advocates for the protection, enhancement, and public enjoyment of the National Parks of England and Wales. It operates as an umbrella body for around 40 environmental and access organisations, collectively representing more than four million people with an interest in National Parks.

== History ==
In 1936 a group of individuals and voluntary organisations, including representatives of the Ramblers, the Youth Hostels Association, the CPRE, and the CPRW, met for the first time to campaign for the establishment of National Parks in Britain. Operating as the Standing Committee on National Parks, the group set out an agenda aimed at securing public access to the countryside and ensuring the permanent protection of significant landscapes.

Following the passage of the National Parks and Access to the Countryside Act 1949, which enabled the designation of National Parks, the role of the Standing Committee changed. Its work focused on strengthening the powers and funding of National Park authorities and monitoring proposals that might affect their natural beauty or public enjoyment. The organisation became the Council for National Parks in 1977 and adopted its current name in June 2008.

== Charitable objectives ==
The Campaign for National Parks' charitable objectives are to:

- Promote the protection, conservation and enhancement of National Parks for the public benefit;
- Promote the quiet enjoyment of National Parks and the appreciation of their natural beauty in an informed and understanding manner;
- Advance public education in and understanding of National Parks through the provision of educational material and other means;
- Promote and undertake research into issues affecting the conservation and enjoyment of National Parks, and to make public the useful results of such research.

== Activities ==
The Campaign for National Parks coordinates a collective of campaigning organisations to advocate for protected landscapes across national and devolved governments. It also highlights and supports the work of individuals and groups involved in safeguarding National Parks. Its key areas of campaigning include strengthening protections for National Parks, improving equitable access, and promoting the designation of additional National Parks.

=== Research ===
The Campaign for National Parks sponsors and undertakes research relating to their charitable objectives and campaigning work.

Key reports include:

- National Parks and the Climate Emergency 2021
- Raising the bar: improving nature in our National Parks 2018
- National Parks for all: making car free travel easier 2018
- Sewage and farm runoff into rivers in National Parks

=== Work in Wales ===
The Campaign for National Parks works to influence the Senedd Cymru on devolved National Park and protected landscape policy and legislation. It has a number of ongoing campaigns in Wales and works in partnership with Welsh organizations and NGOs such as the Welsh National Park societies, Welsh Environment Link, Campaign for the Protection of Rural Wales, RSPB Cymru and particularly the Alliance for Welsh Designated Landscapes.

== National Park Societies ==
There are 12 National Park Societies dedicated to protecting and enhancing National Parks.

- Friends of the Lake District
- North York Moors Association
- Friends of the Dales
- Dartmoor Preservation Association
- The Exmoor Society
- Broads Society
- Friends of the New Forest
- Friends of the South Downs
- Snowdonia Society
- Brecon Beacons Park Society
- Friends of Pembrokeshire Coast National Park
- CPRE Peak District and South Yorkshire

There is no independent society representing Northumberland National Park.

== Presidents and vice presidents ==
The campaign has a number of vice presidents: Adrian Phillips, Alan Mattingly, Angus Lunn, Baroness Andrews, Dei Tomos, Fiona Reynolds, Iolo Williams, Lord Inglewood, Lord Norrie, Viscount Addison, Sara Edwards, Ben Fogle, and three Honorary Life Vice Presidents: Brian Blessed, Chris Bonington and Libby Purves.

Previous presidents and vice presidents have included Caroline Quentin, Lord Bridges, Baroness Hamwee, Lord Judd and Lord Walpole.
