= Bridge 19-40 Canal Society =

Scottish waterway society

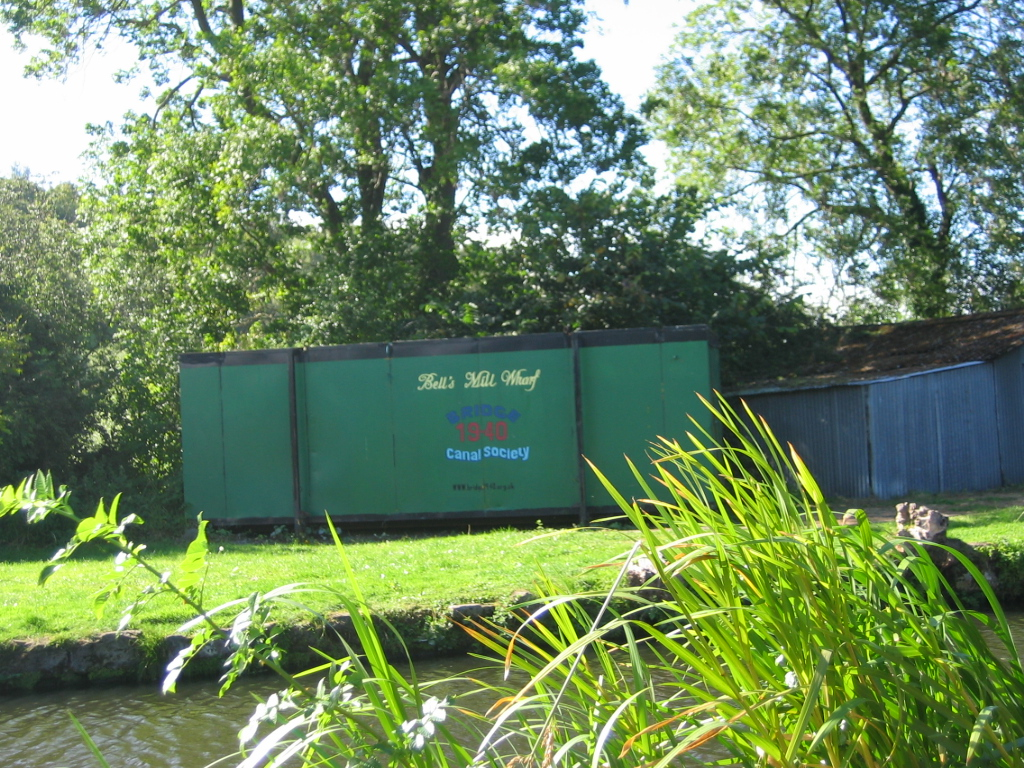

The Bridge 19-40 Canal Society is a Scottish waterway society and registered charity operating community boats on the Union Canal, with bases at Winchburgh and Drumshoreland, West Lothian.

== History ==
The former B.U.C.H.A.N. Society, a canal society from Broxburn, decided at their 1999 AGM to extend the area covered by the society, and to change its name. The new "Bridge 19-40 Canal Society" was to operate between Bridge 19 (the first bridge in West Lothian) and Bridge 40 (at Philpstoun). The new name was also meant to convey its role as a bridge between several local communities along the Union Canal.

== Activities ==
The society's aims include:

- promotion of co-operation between all canal users
- support for the sympathetic and sustainable development of the waterway and its environment
- provision of volunteering opportunities for all ages
- protection of natural habitats of the canal
- encouragement of leisure use by the community including people with disabilities.

Along with the Seagull Trust, the Linlithgow Union Canal Society, the Edinburgh Canal Society, Forth Canoe Club and other canal-based community groups and charities, Bridge 19-40 Canal Society has campaigned for the retention, renovation and re-use of the Scottish Lowland canals.

Bridge 19-40 regularly organises Water Safety trips for primary schools in West Lothian; their aim is to raise awareness among children about the potential dangers of water, and to discourage litter on the waterway.

== Photo gallery ==
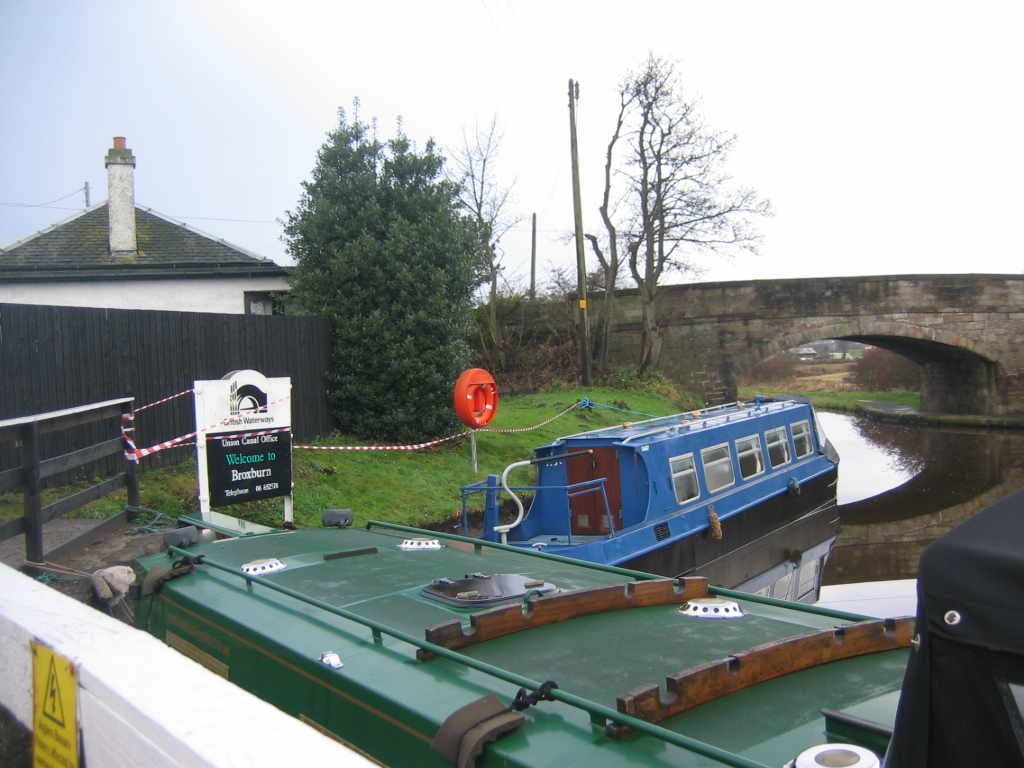
Bluebell's moorings at BW Drumshoreland

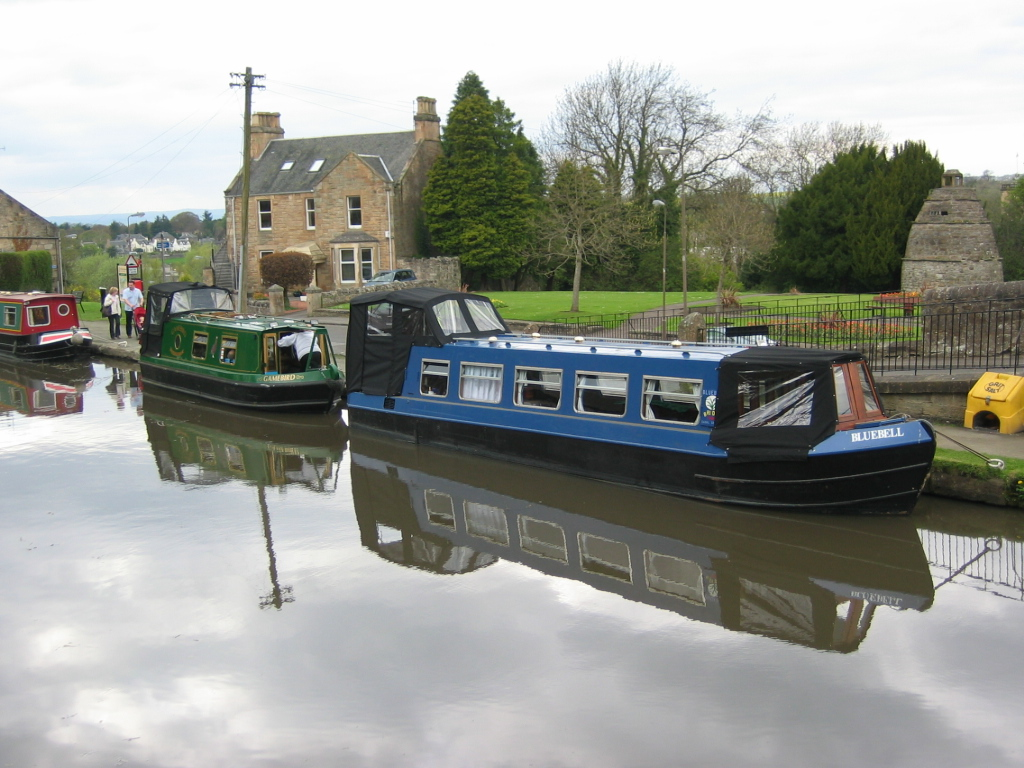
Bluebell at SIWA Rally 2008

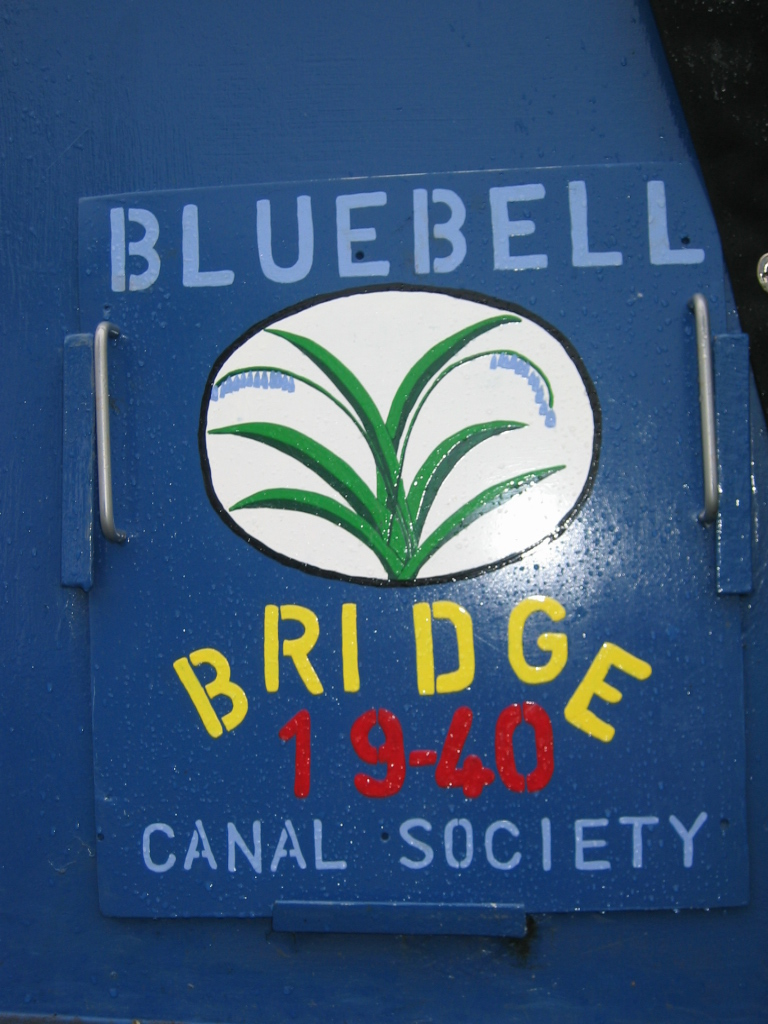
Detail on Bluebell's cabin

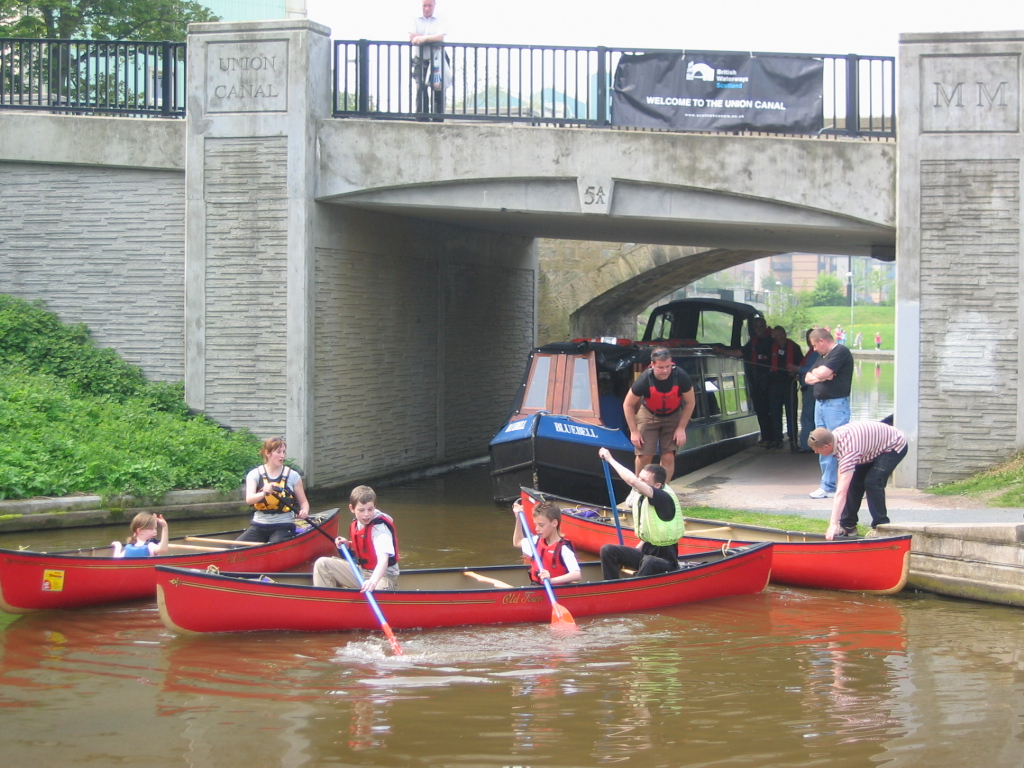
Bluebell at wester Hailes Canal Festival, Edinburgh

== See also ==
- List of places in West Lothian
- List of waterway societies in the United Kingdom
