= Association of Waterways Cruising Clubs =

The Association of Waterways Cruising clubs is a waterway society and umbrella organisation in England, UK. It was founded in the early 1960s by the St Pancras, Dunstable and District, Uxbridge and Lee and Stort boat clubs as an inter-club scheme for an emergency service for boaters, and for safe overnight moorings.

The Association grew quickly from the original four clubs to eighteen, and it published its first handbook giving club locations and phone numbers. In the late Seventies, there were eighty clubs, and a regional structure was adopted.

Today, the AWCC represents over twenty thousand affiliated boat owners, through their membership of more than a hundred cruising clubs. The association enters consultations and negotiations with British Waterways, the Environment Agency and other bodies, and it is an Associate Member of the Parliamentary Waterways Group.

Members of AWCC:

- Airedale Boat Club, Ash Tree Boat Club, Ashby Canal Association, Aylesbury Canal Society
- Basingstoke Canal Boating Club, Black Buoy Cruising Club, Boaters Christian Fellowship, Bridgewater Motor Boat Club, Byfleet Boat Club
- Coombeswood Canal Trust, Coventry Canal Society, Cutweb Internet Boating Club
- Derby Motor Boat Club, Dunstable and District Boat Club
- Electric Boat Association
- Lichfield Cruising Club, Lincoln Boat Club, Longwood Boat Club, Lymm Cruising Club
- Mersey Motor Boat Club
- Norbury Cruising Club, North Cheshire Cruising Club
- Oundle Cruising Club
- Peterborough Yacht Club, Pewsey Wharf Boat Club
- Rammey Marsh Cruising Club
- Sale Cruising Club, Saul Junction Boat Owners Club, Sea Otter Owners Club, Soar Boating Club, South Pennine Boat Club, Stafford Boat Club, St Pancras Cruising Club, Seamaster Club, Strawberry Island Boat Club
- Tamworth Cruising Club
- Watch House Cruising Club, Waterway Recovery Group Cruising Club, West London Motor Cruising Club, Wheelton Boat Club, Wilderness Boat Owners Club

== See also ==
- List of waterway societies in the United Kingdom
