= NCBA =

NCBA may refer to:

- National College of Business and Arts
- National Club Baseball Association
- National Cattlemen's Beef Association
- National Collegiate Boxing Association
- National Cooperative Business Association
- National Community Boats Association
- North Carolina Bar Association
- Northern California Band Association
- Northern California Baseball Association
- NCBA Group
