= National Community Boats Association =

Waterway society in United Kingdom

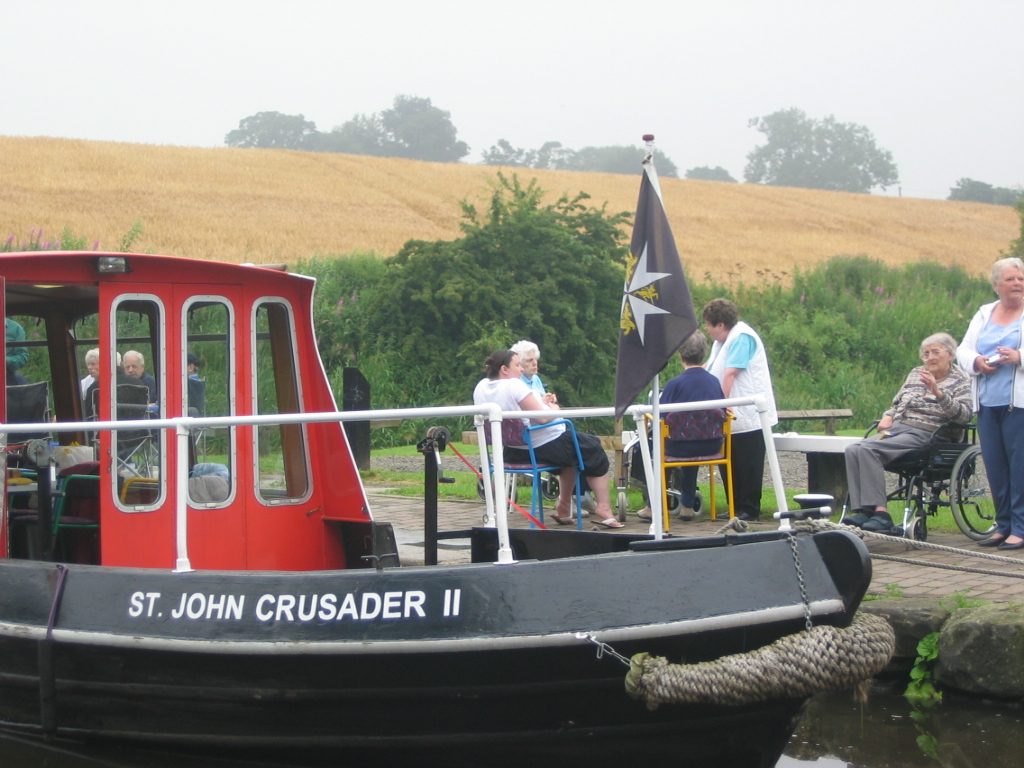

The National Community Boats Association (NCBA) is a waterway society, registered charity No. 1108993 and limited company No. 5331820, in the United Kingdom.

NCBA supports community boat projects and encourages more people to access the inland waterways of the UK. Its headquarters are at the Yorkshire Waterways Museum in Goole. The NCBA held a National Conference towards the end of 2008.

== Member organisations ==
The association has over 100 member community boat projects, all over the UK.

Organisations which are members of the National Community Boats Association operate boats which are specially designed and equipped to cater for people with disabilities, with learning difficulties and learning disabilities, disadvantaged groups, people with special needs, people of all ages.

These organisations carry an estimated 250,000 passengers per year from the above-mentioned groups.

== Membership list ==
- Accessible Boating Association, Hampshire
- Adam's Ark Project, Doncaster
- Angel Community Canal Boat Trust, London ACCT Website
- Baldwin Boat Trust, Leicester Website
- BDN Guide Counties Narrowboat, Birmingham, West Midlands
- Beauchamp Lodge Settlement, London Website
- Birmingham City Council Youth Service Division
- Bradford Out & About Barge Association, West Yorkshire Website
- Brent Play Association, Wembley
- Bromley Youth Trust, Kent
- Camden Canals & Narrowboat Association CCNA Website
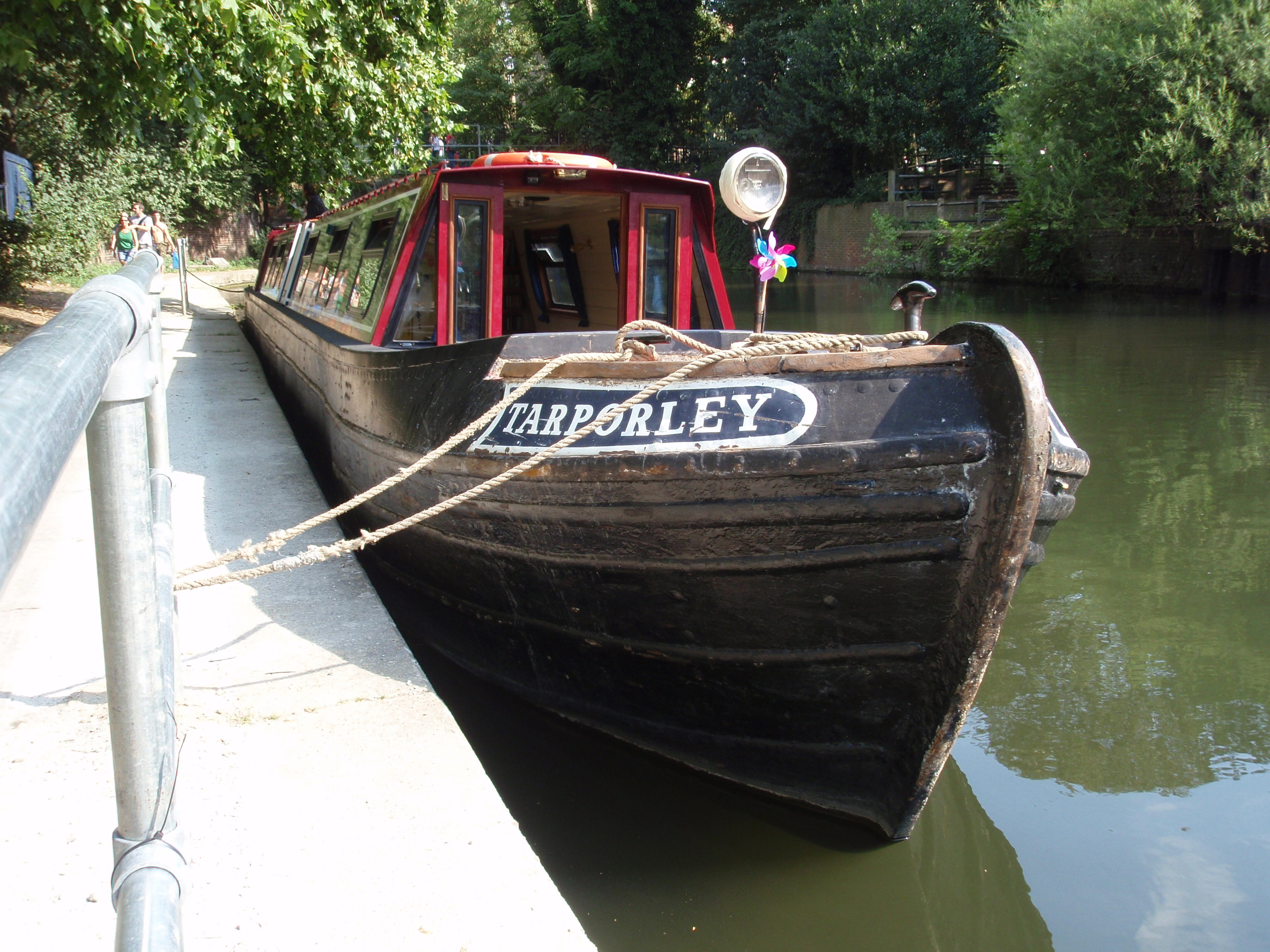
CCNA's Historic Narrowboat 'Tarporley'
- Canal Boat Adventure Project, Cheshire
- Canal Boat Project CBP website
- Care Afloat, Skelmersdale, Lancashire
- Children's Activity & Recreational Projects, Wolverhampton
- East Manchester Community Boat Project, Hyde EMCBP Website
- Ethel Trust Community Barge, Sheffield ETCB Website
- Gloucestershire Disabled Afloat Riverboats Trust Website
- Hampshire County Council Youth Services
- Heulwen Trust, Welshpool Website
- Hillingdon Narrowboats Association, Middlesex HNA Website
- Kensington Foundation, Blackpool
- Laburnum Boat Club, Hackney's Community Boating Project Website
- London Narrow Boat Project, Luton, Bedfordshire
- Maypole Community Boat Projects, Birmingham
- Mosaic, Shaping Disability Services, Leicester
- Nottingham Narrowboat Project
- Open Lock Project Website
- Oxfordshire Narrowboat Trust
- Queen Elizabeth's Foundation for Disabled People, Leatherhead, Surrey
- Reach Out Projects, Hertfordshire Website
- Re-Union, Edinburgh Website
- River Thames Boat Project, Kingston-upon-Thames RTBP Website
- Rivertime Boat Trust (RBT), Maidenhead, Berkshire RBT Website
- Safe Anchor Trust, Mirfield, West Yorkshire S.A.T Website
- South Staffordshire Narrowboat Company Ltd, Wolverhampton Website
- South West Herts Narrowboat Project, Hertfordshire Website
- St Andrew's Methodist Youth Centre, Bristol
- St John Ambulance, Northampton, and Nottinghamshire
- Stockport Canal Boat Project SCBP Website
- Surrey Care Trust Swingbridge Community Boat Programmes, Swingbridge Website
- Surrey County Council Outdoor Learning & Development, Surrey
- Swansea Community Boat Trust SCBT Website
- Thames & Kennet Narrowboat Trust, Wokingham, Berkshire Website
- The Bruce Charitable Trust, Hungerford BCT Website
- The Bruce Wake Charitable Trust, Rutland BWCT Website
- The Canal Boat Project, Hertfordshire, and Harlow, Essex
- The Kingfisher Medway Trust, Faversham, Kent KMT Website
- The Lyneal Trust, Shrewsbury Website
- The Pirate Club, London Website
- The Seagull Trust, Ratho, Edinburgh Website
- The Sobriety Project, Goole, East Riding of Yorkshire Website
- The Wharf Narrowboat, Walsall
- The Willow Trust, Cirencester, Gloucestershire
- Tideway Adventurers Narrowboat Project, London TANP Website
- Top Lock Training, Stockport TLT Website
- Truman Enterprise Narrowboat Trust, Walsall TENT Website
- Unity Enterprise, Govan, Scotland
- Vale of Llangollen Canal Boat Trust, Llangollen, Clwyd, Wales VLCBT Website
- Warwickshire Association of Youth Clubs Website
- Waterstart, Goole
- Waveney Stardust, Lowestoft, Suffolk Website
- Wildside Activity Centre, Wolverhampton WAC Website
- Wirral Community Narrowboat Trust, Ellesmere Port WCNT Website
- Wooden Canal Boat Society

== Training for community boat operators ==
NCBA also delivers training for the management of community boats.

The Certificate in Community Boat Management is a nationally accredited course for helmsmen and crew members working with people who are young, elderly, disadvantaged or disabled on Class A or B Waters.

Other courses: Basic Boat Handling; Complete Crew Course; Regional Training Moderator; Senior Trainer; CCBM Training Endorsement; and Additional Course Units.

== Work with offenders and young persons ==
NCBA is operating two special projects:

- Y-AFLOAT - Involving young people in community boating
- Prisons Project - facilitating the reunion of offenders with their families

The UK Government's Department for Education and Skills awarded the National Community Boats Association an NVYO grant of £123,990 for youth work.

== See also ==
- List of waterway societies in the United Kingdom
