= Birmingham Canal Navigations Society =

The Birmingham Canal Navigations Society is a waterway society, a registered charity no. 1091760 (since 1968) and a limited company no. 4306537 (since 2002), operating on the Birmingham Canal Navigations, and based IN Oldbury, West Midlands, England.

== See also ==
- List of waterway societies in the United Kingdom
- List of navigation authorities in the United Kingdom
