= Horseboating Society =

Society promoting horse-drawn boating

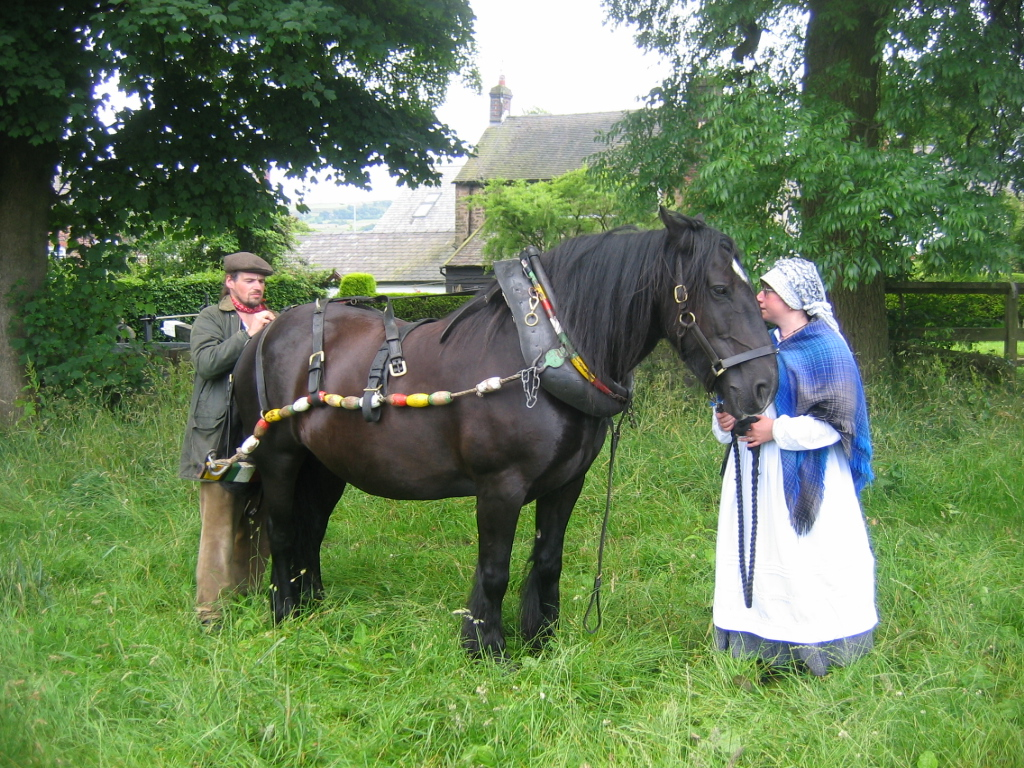
Boathorse Queenie

The Horseboating Society is a national society, with the primary aim being the preservation and promotion of Horseboating on the canals of Great Britain. The Society was founded on 19 January 2001 at the Ellesmere Port Boat Museum, and it is the only organisation in the UK solely dedicated to horseboating.

== Horseboating ==
- See main article: Horse-drawn boats

Boat horses were the prime movers of the Industrial Revolution, and they remained at work until the middle of the 20th century. Today, horseboating is a way of recapturing the working lives of this former waterway community, especially the thousands of families and the tradesmen who kept the traffic moving.

== Achievements and notable journeys ==
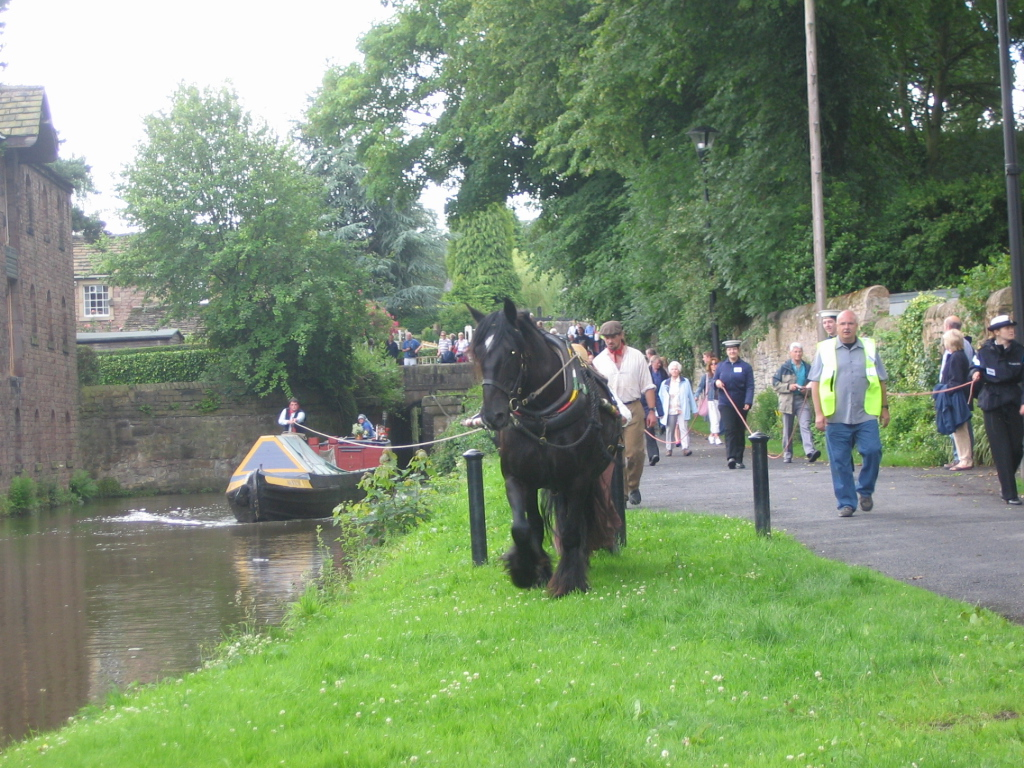
Horseboat descending Marple Locks

On 4 August 2006, Robin Evans, Chief Executive of British Waterways, joined horseboat Maria at Portland Basin, where the Lower Peak Forest Canal meets the Ashton Canal. Maria is Ashton Packet Boat Company's flagship narrowboat and Britain's oldest surviving wooden narrowboat, built in 1854 by Jinks Boatyard in Marple, and still horsepowered to this day, i.e. permanently without an engine. He took part in a taster session of driving boathorse Queenie along a section of the canal, and he proceeded to take Maria through Hyde Bank Tunnel by legging the boat from the cabin roof. This journey was also notable since Maria used to carry limestone (1854 to ca. 1904) from Bugsworth Basin to Ashton-under-Lyne, and the Society chose to commemorate this by re-enacting the journey, more than 100 years later.

In 2007, the Society made a journey along the Leeds and Liverpool Canal to the World Canals Conference in Liverpool. The society was awarded a grant of £42,500 from the Heritage Lottery Fund for this journey and other activities in support of the World Canals Conference. This journey was also part of British Waterways' "Coal and Cotton" event, celebrating the Leeds and Liverpool Canal's history of transporting coal from Leeds and Wigan to Liverpool, and taking cotton from Liverpool docks to Leeds. Maria duly carried sacks of coal, and samples of cotton supplied by the Merseyside Maritime Museum.

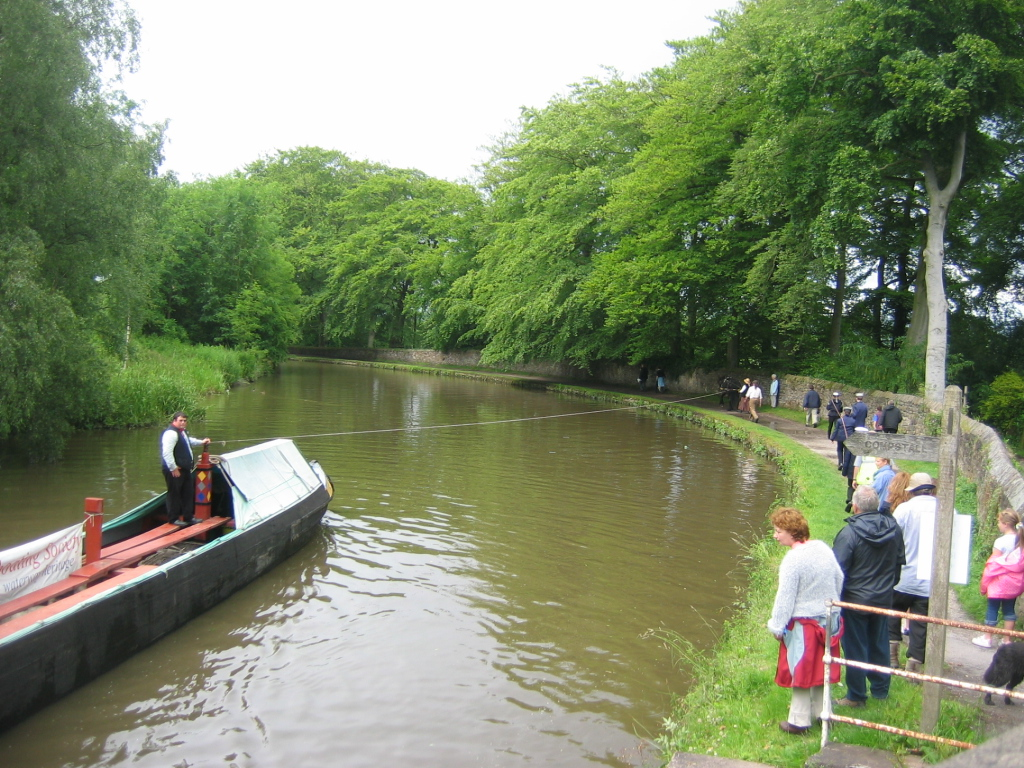
Horseboat under tow

In May 2008, NB Maria was horse-drawn again, this time on the Huddersfield Narrow Canal. She had been "legged" through the Standedge Tunnel in 2006, the first boat to have been legged through in 60 years at that time. This time, a UK Government minister and a local Member of Parliament took turns at legging Maria through the highest, longest, and deepest canal tunnel in the UK.

In 2012, NB Elland was horse-drawn for the full length of the Leeds and Liverpool Canal, believed to be the first time such a journey had been made for 68 years, culminating in a demonstration pull through the new Liverpool Canal Link.

In the annual Waterways Renaissance Awards 2008, jointly organised by the British Urban Regeneration Association and by The Waterways Trust, the Horseboating Society achieved the "Commended" award in the "Historic Environment" section.

The Society works closely with British Waterways, the Boat Museum Society, the British Horse Society, the Inland Waterways Association, the Towpath Action Group, the Institute of Historic Building Conservation, and the Shropshire Union Flyboat Restoration Society.

== Horseboating Gallery ==
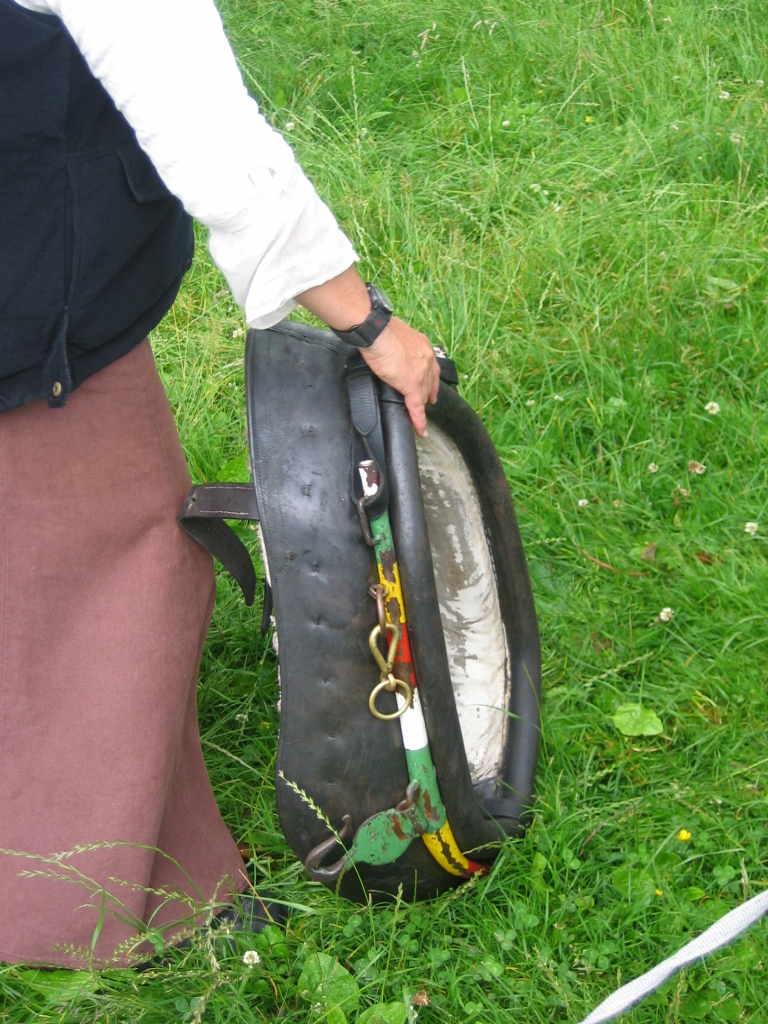
Boathorse harnessing demonstration

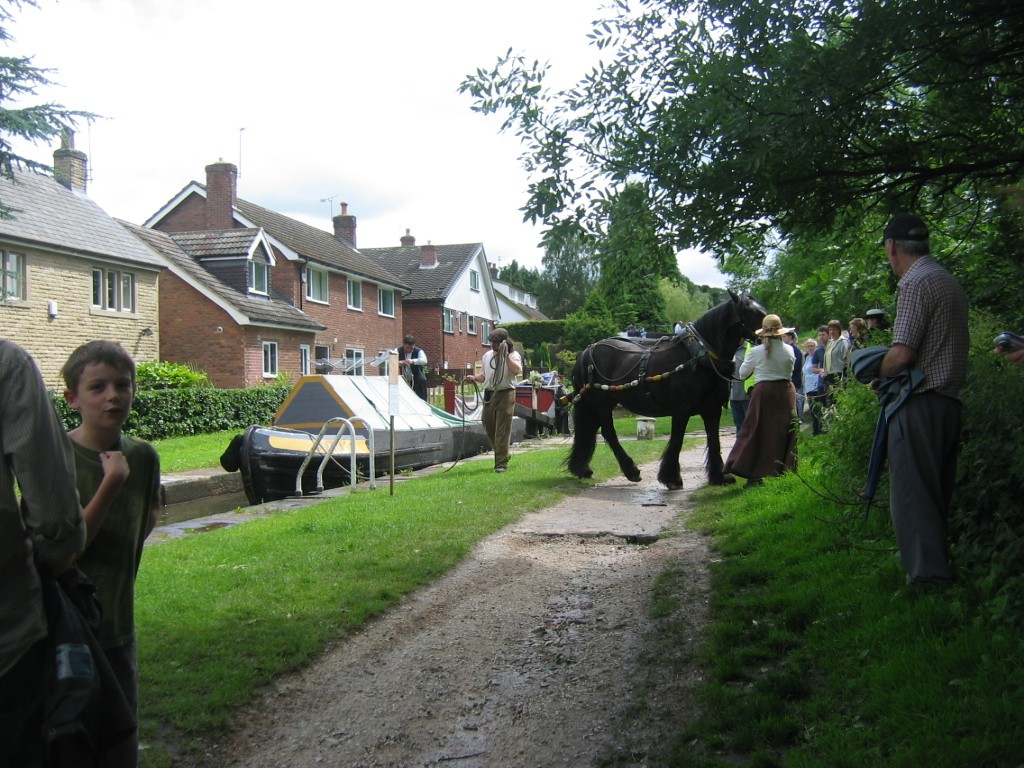
Queenie the Boathorse

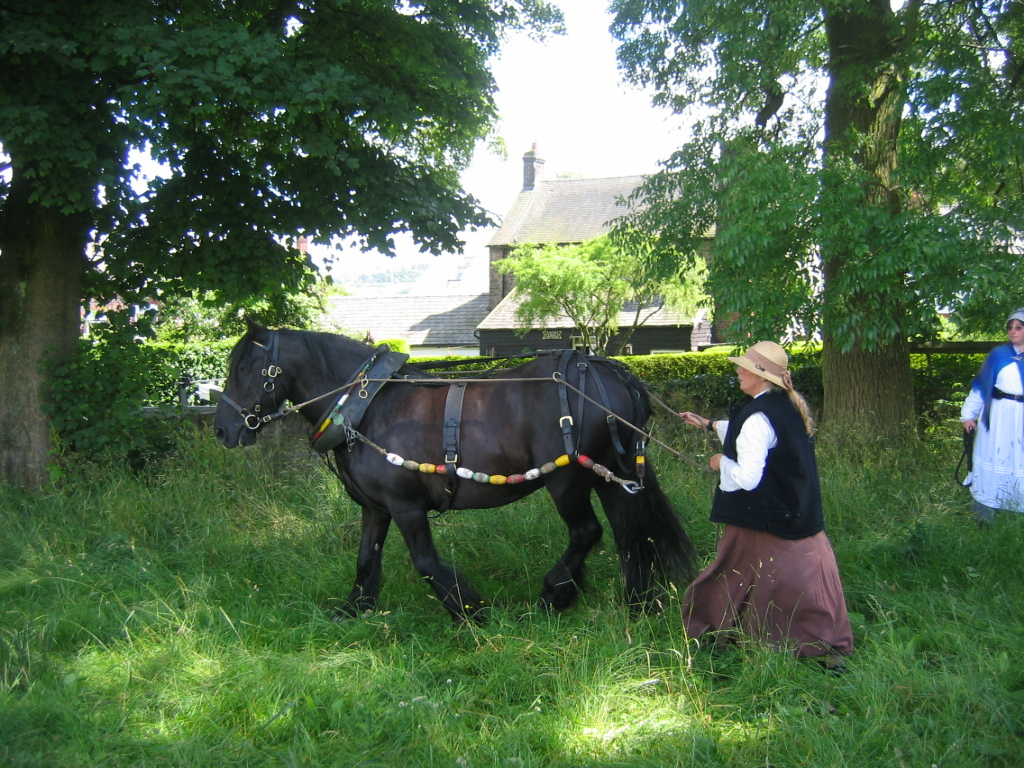
Boathorse driving demonstration

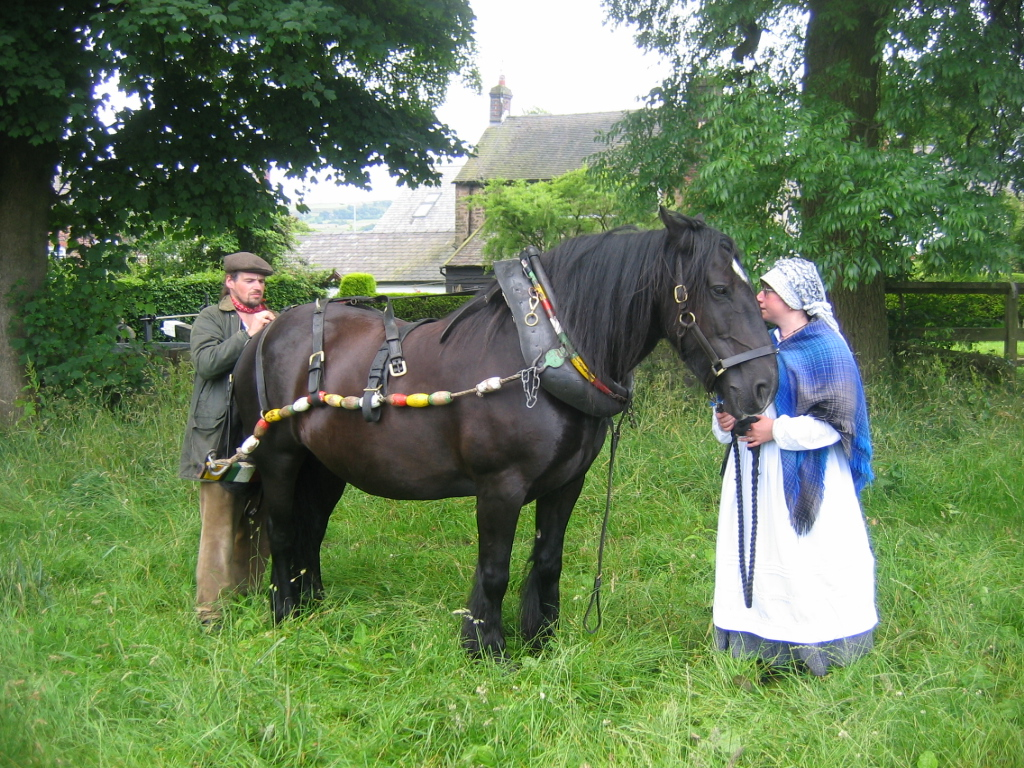
Boathorse Queenie with driver

== See also ==
- Canal
- Waterway restoration
- List of waterway societies in the United Kingdom
