= Steam Boat Association of Great Britain =

Waterway society

The Steam Boat Association of Great Britain (SBA) is a waterway society formed in 1971 to promote steamboats and represent steamboat owners' interests. A third of its 700 members live outside the UK.

The association with around 700 members, which holds rallies all over the UK and other events including national and regional meetings, technical seminars, displays at model engineering exhibitions, and engages with a range of related engineering topics. It also publishes technical manuals and the SBA's quarterly journal The Funnel, an 96pp colour production designed to bring together and inform steam boaters around the world.

The SBA recognises that maintaining, operating and or building a steam boat demands an amount of engineering skills. Close attention is paid to safety issues and particularly the integrity of boilers and steam fittings.

The SBA also provides boiler testing services for members via its trading arm, Steamboat Association Services Ltd (SBAS).

It is estimated that of the 400 or so small steam launches in the UK (most of which are between 5–10 metres in length) around 90 or so will steam in any given summer season. The club also includes a number of larger steam boats, from inland canal narrowboats through to coastal vessels, as well as an overseas membership.

== See also ==
- List of waterway societies in the United Kingdom
