= Broads Society =

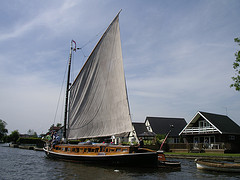
Hathor, a Norfolk Wherry

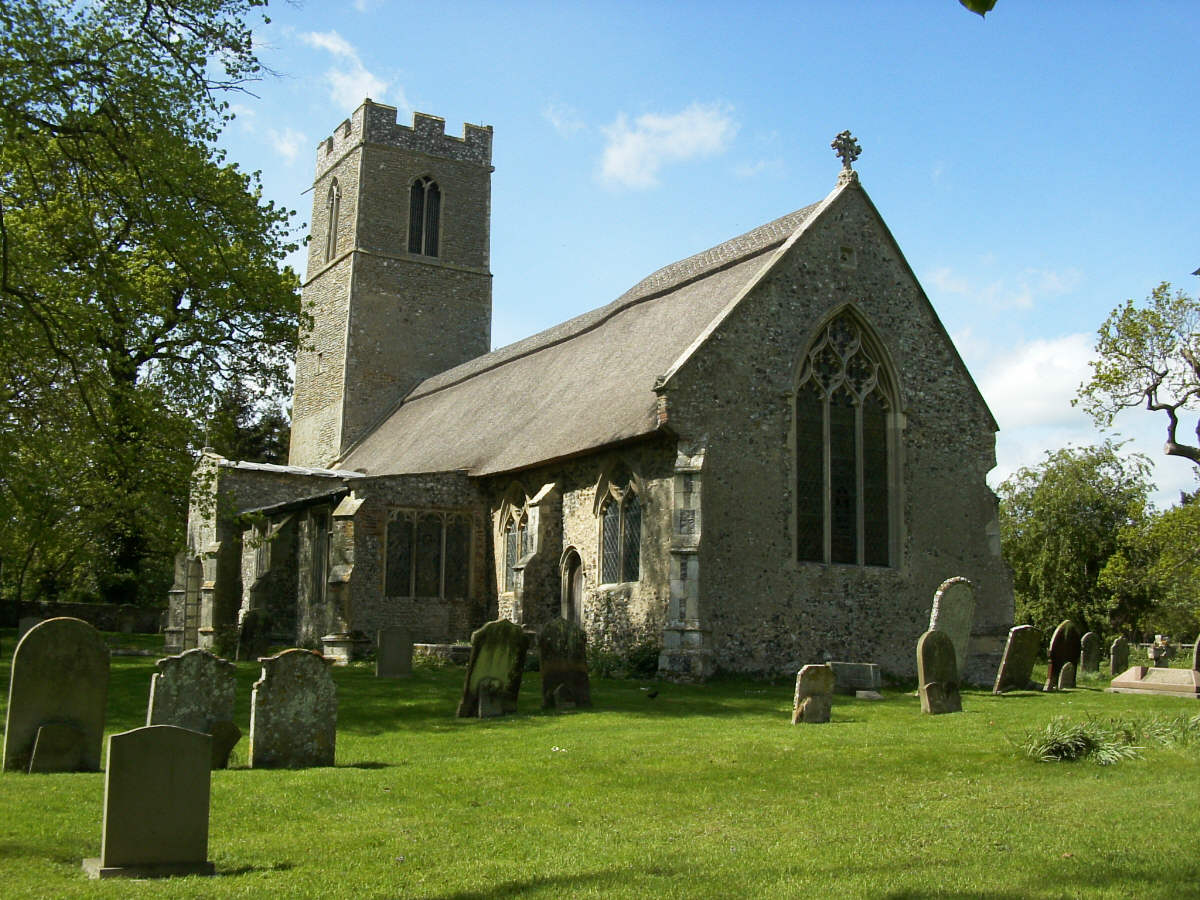
Irstead Shoals

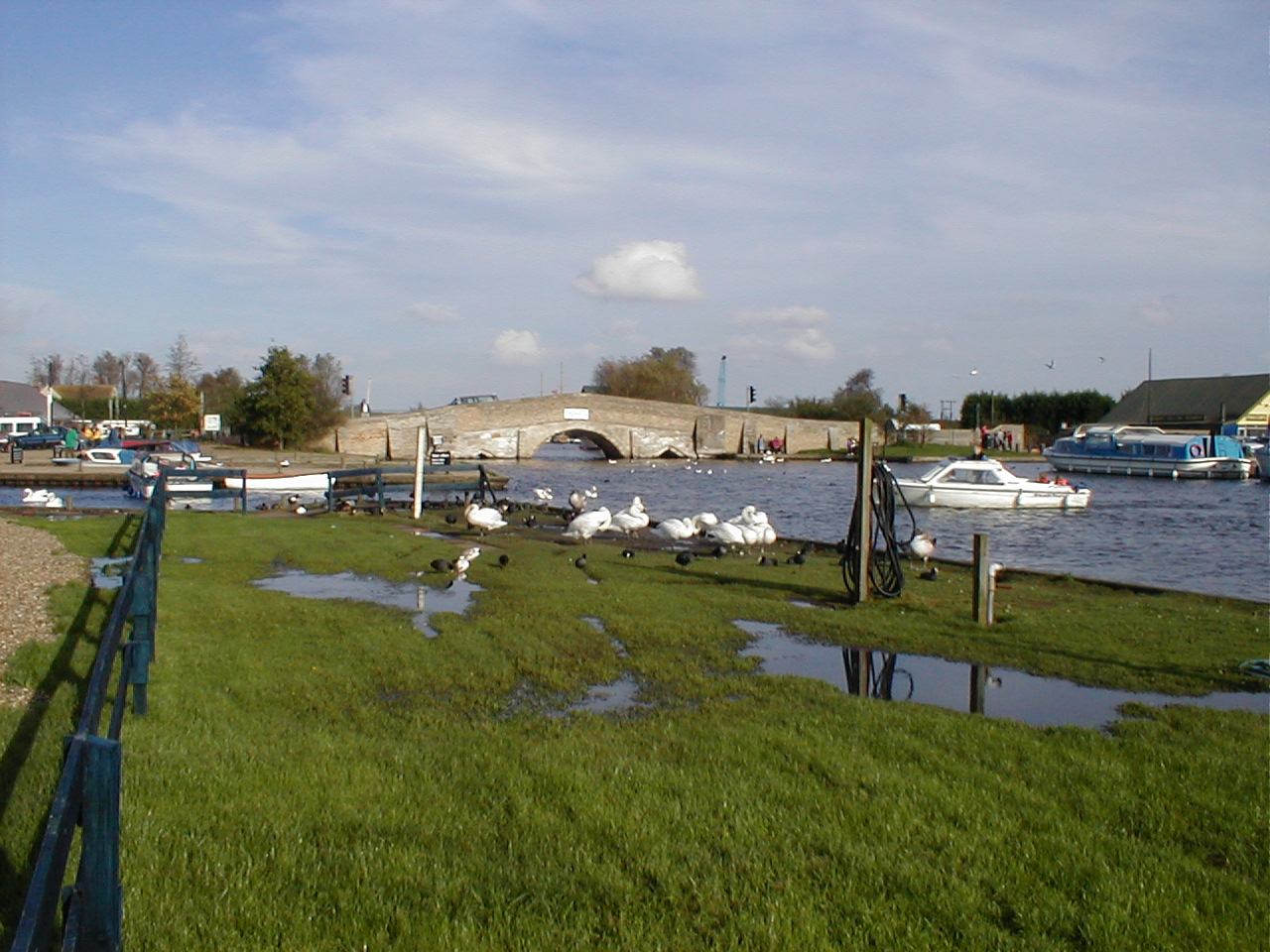
Potter Heigham Bridge

The Broads Society is a waterway society in Norfolk and Suffolk, England, UK.

The society was founded in 1956 to provide a focus for anyone interested in the region, e.g. navigators, naturalists, farmers, residents and visitors. It campaigned in the 1960s and 1970s for special status for The Broads, and in 1988 the area was given special protection, a status similar to that of a National Park after the passing of the Norfolk & Suffolk Broads Act 1988.

Today the Broads Society has a membership of about 1200, and it monitors pressures on the unique Broads environment, as well as commenting on planning applications. It is represented on the Broads Authority's Broads Forum.

The Broads Society became a joint owner of the eel sett at Candle Dyke which is the last working sett in the East of England.

The Society's volunteers are known as "Broadsword"; they work during the winter months clearing trees and scrub from river banks. This encourages the re-colonisation of banks by reedswamp and helps maintains the unique environment found in Broadland. It also improves sailing conditions.

The Mission Statement of the Broads Society is as follows: "Our members share a common purpose to help secure a sustainable future for The Broads as a unique and protected landscape in which leisure, tourism and the local economy can thrive in harmony with the natural environment".

== See also ==
- List of waterway societies in the United Kingdom
