= Towpath Action Group =

The Towpath Action Group (TAG) is a waterway society in the United Kingdom, campaigning for better access to towpaths.

== History ==
The group started in Manchester in 1987 after Don Lee, working as a part-time tutor, took groups of students from the Manchester Workers' Education Association on walks to explore the canals of the city. The series was called "Byways and Backwaters of Manchester", and one of the first visits was to a flight of nine locks on the Rochdale Canal, where the towpath had been restored by a Community Task Force. Some weeks later, a return visit found that a wall had been built across the towpath, preventing access, and the group decided to take action. The conducted a towpath access survey for the whole length of the canal, and produced a report on their findings. The report was ready for publication in 1988, as the WEA course drew to a close, and several members of the group thought it was appropriate to carry on monitoring the situation. The report was published as "Trouble on the Towpath", in time to coincide with the Inland Waterways Association's 1988 National Rally at Castlefield, and the group became the Towpath Action Group.

== Aims ==
The group is continuing to campaign for continuous towpaths with good access. The work has expanded further afield, and members of TAG are regularly consulted by British Waterways and Defra. One founder member was appointed to a statutory body, the Inland Waterways Amenity and Advisory Council (IWAAC), and another member sits on the Inland Waterways Association's Restoration Committee.

TAG aims to build up good relations with walkers, ramblers, cyclists, anglers, horseboaters and other towpath users, and environmental organisations.

In 2001, the group presented a report entitled "Walking in Towns and Cities" to the House of Commons Select Committee on Environment, Transport and Regional Affair, presenting a case for increased use of urban towpaths, and ideas for funding their maintenance.

== See also ==
- List of waterway societies in the United Kingdom

== Bibliography ==
- Cumberlidge, Jane (2009). Inland Waterways of Great Britain (8th Ed.). Imray Laurie Norie and Wilson. ISBN 978-1-84623-010-3.
