= Scottish Inland Waterways Association =

Organization

The Scottish Inland Waterways Association (SIWA) was a registered charity and association of canal societies and individual canal enthusiasts in Scotland.

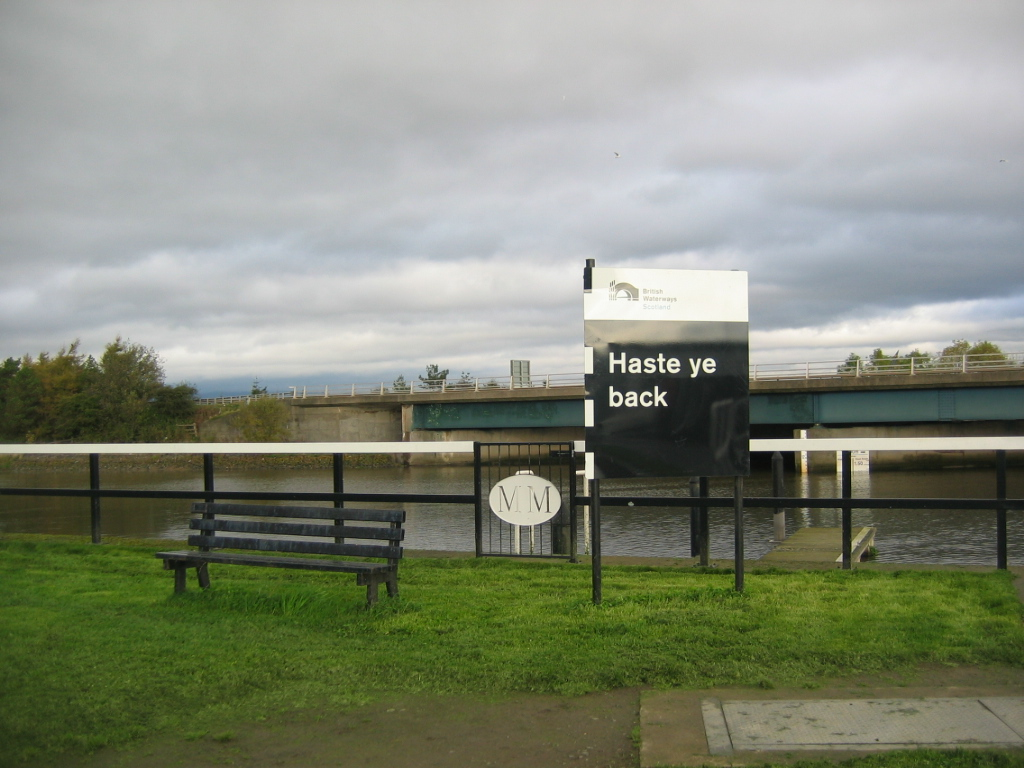
Forth & Clyde Sealock, Scotland

The Association was founded in 1970 by canal enthusiasts who, after the closure of the Union Canal and the Forth & Clyde Canal, wanted to restore and preserve them as part of Scotland's historical, architectural and recreational assets.

SIWA explored the possibility of becoming a branch of the Inland Waterways Association (IWA), but decided against it. At SIWA's Inaugural Meeting, the General Secretary of IWA welcomed the setting up of a separate Scottish organisation.

By 1975, SIWA made it into print in the Shell Book of Inland Waterways: "SIWA ... holds a long-term and ambitious aim of seeing the waterways re-opened for sizeable craft throughout".

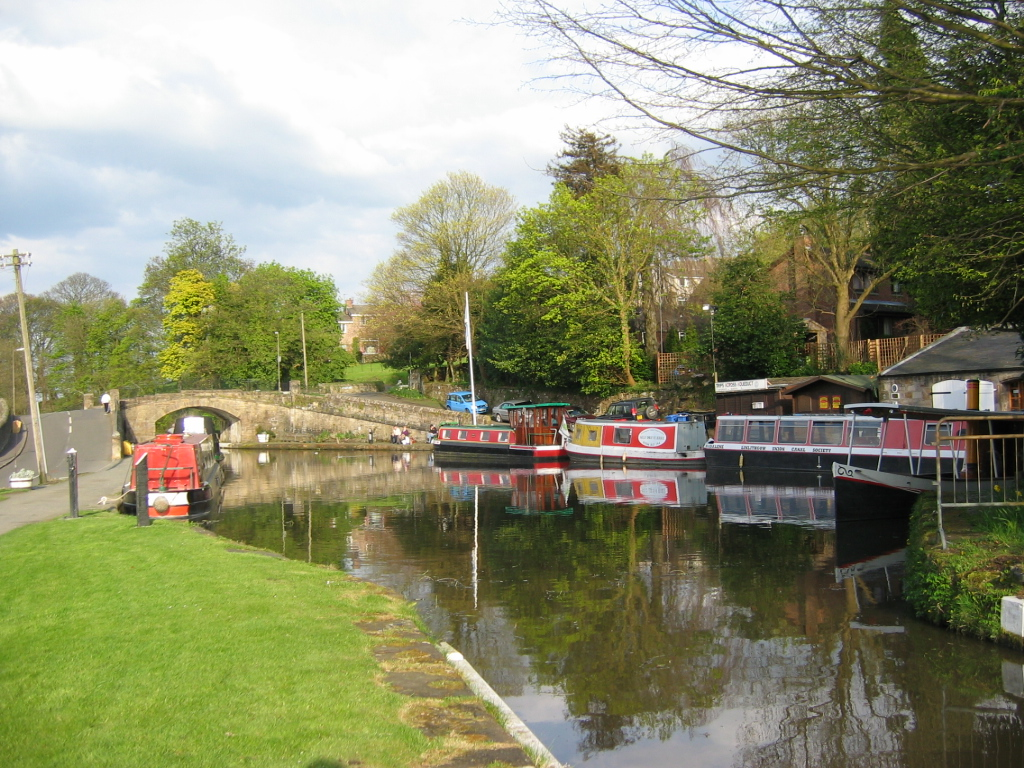
SIWA Rally 2008 at Linlithgow

SIWA has many corporate and individual members who are helping to campaign on restoration, environmental, and day-to-day canal issues. This applies to both leisure and commercial users.

The Association works with British Waterways Scotland on both the Freshwater Group and the Saltwater Group, as well as the level of fees, the supply of services; and maintenance of navigation.

It also engages with British Waterways on restoring the navigability of the River Leven.

SIWA has strong links with the Inland Waterways Association Ireland (IWAI). An alternating exchange visit takes place every year. In 2008, the Scots visited the Irish, with visits to Lough Erne and Enniskillen. In 2009, the Irish have visited the Crinan Canal.

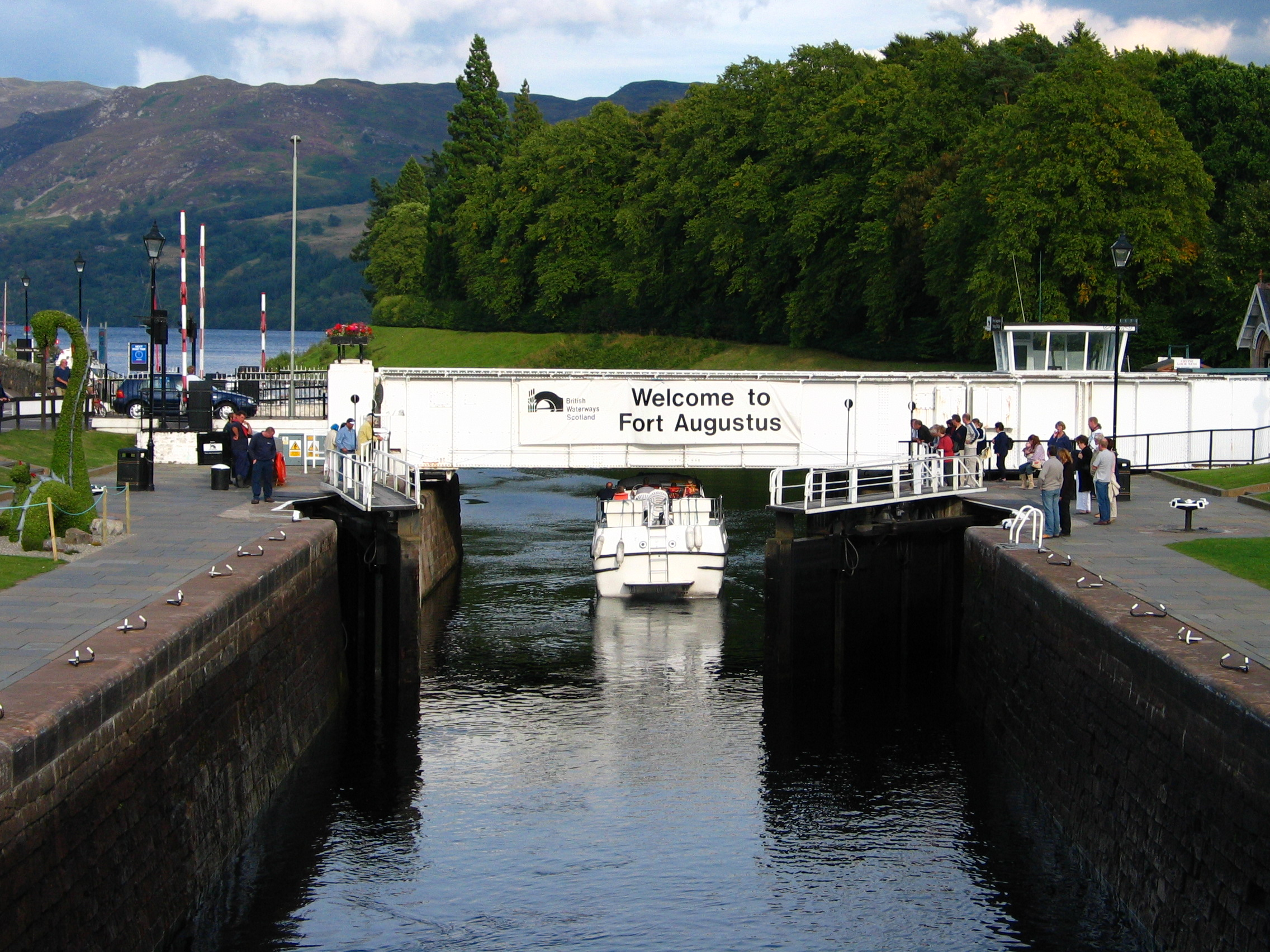
Caledonian Canal, Fort Augustus, Scotland

== SIWA affiliated organisations ==
- Bridge 19-40 Canal Society
- Edinburgh Canal Society
- Falkirk and District Canals Society
- Forth and Clyde Canal Society
- Forth Yacht Clubs Association
- Great Glen Canal Users Association
- Linlithgow Union Canal Society
- Royal Yachting Association (Scotland)
- Seagull Trust
- Sycharwell Project
- Members of the Caledonian Canal Operators Association:
  - Caley Cruisers
  - European Waterways
  - Jacobite Cruises
  - Highland Voyages
  - Caledonian Discovery
  - West Highland Sailing
  - Magna Carta Steamship Company
  - Capercaillie Cruisers / Black Prince

== See also ==
- Canals of the United Kingdom
- History of the British canal system
