= Horse-drawn boat =

Canal boat pulled by a horse on a towpath

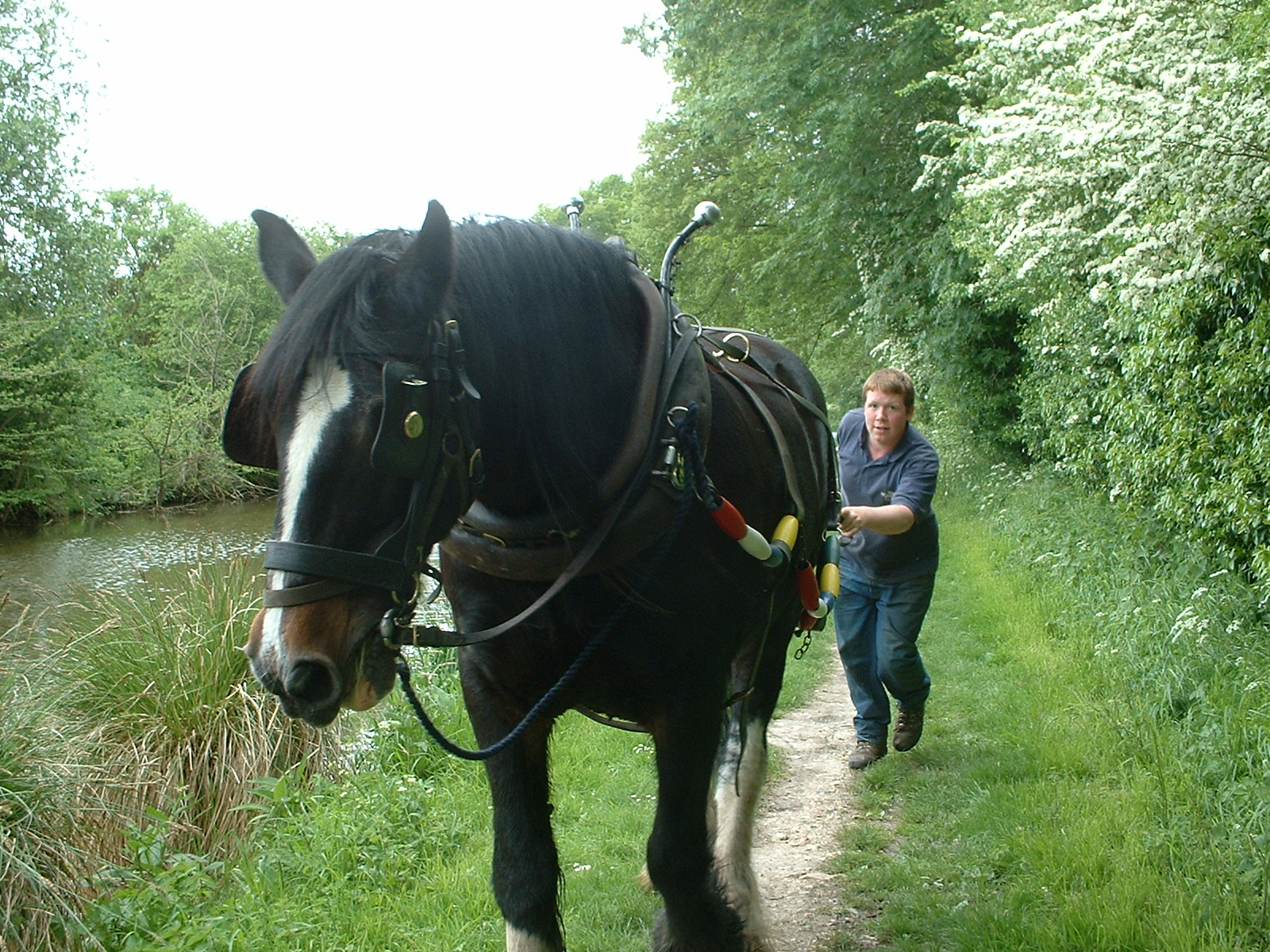
Horse drawing from a towpath on the Kennet and Avon Canal.

A horse-drawn boat or tow-boat is a historic boat operating on a canal, pulled by a horse walking beside the canal on a towpath.

== United Kingdom ==
The Romans are known to have used mules to haul boats on their waterways in the UK. Boat horses were the prime movers of the Industrial Revolution, and they remained at work until the middle of the 20th century. A horse, towing a boat with a rope from the towpath, could pull fifty times as much cargo as it could pull in a cart or wagon on roads. In the early days of the Canal Age, from about 1740, all boats and barges were towed by horse, mule, hinny, pony or sometimes a pair of donkeys. Many of the surviving buildings and structures had been designed with horse power in mind. Horse-drawn boats were used well into the 1960s on UK canals for commercial transport, and are still used today by passenger trip boats and other pleasure traffic.

The Horseboating Society has the primary aims of preserving and promoting Horseboating on the canals of the United Kingdom. There are horseboat operators at Foxton, Godalming, Tiverton, Ashton-under-Lyne, Newbury, Llangollen and Maesbury Marsh, Shropshire on the Montgomery Canal.

=== NB Maria ===
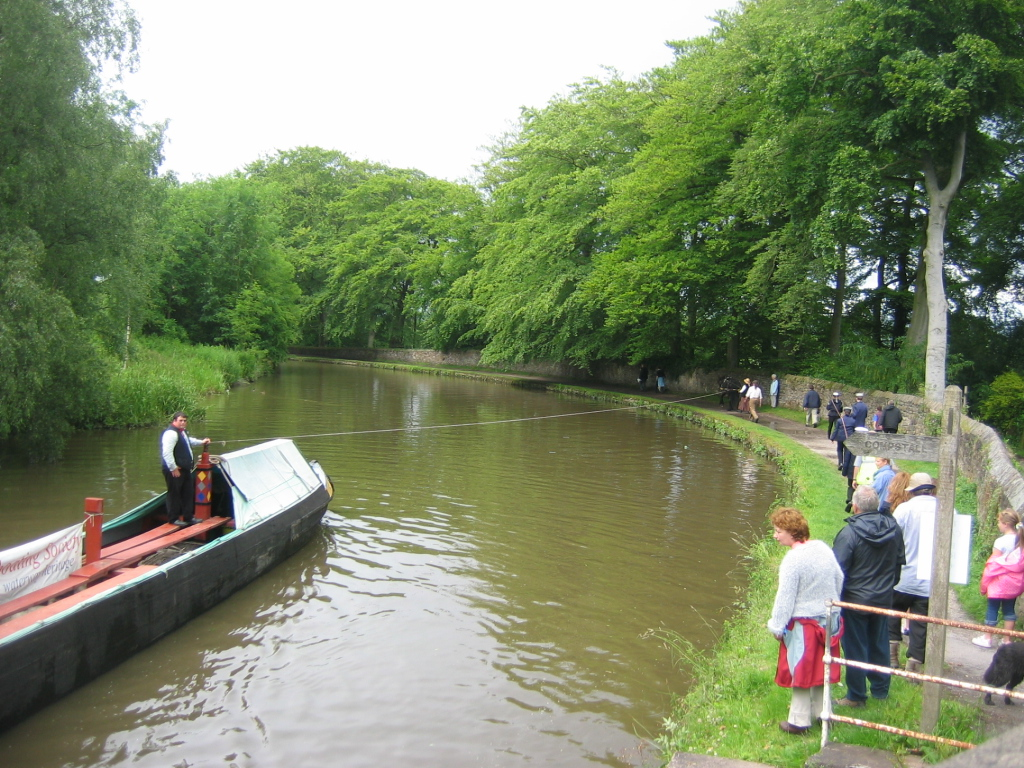
Horseboat Maria on the Peak Forest Canal

Maria is Britain's oldest surviving wooden narrowboat, built in 1854 by Jinks Boatyard in Marple, and was never converted to have an engine. From 1854 to 1897, Maria was used to carry railway track ballast for the Manchester, Sheffield and Lincolnshire Railway. It was then used as a maintenance boat until 1962, lay abandoned for nine years until being salvaged in 1972 and converted to a passenger boat in 1978. In 2000 it was restored to near original operating condition.

Maria is currently owned by Ashton Packet Boat Company. It is sometimes loaned to the Horseboating Society and has taken part in several of their events, including British Waterways' "Coal and Cotton" event, celebrating the Leeds and Liverpool Canal's history of transporting coal from Leeds and Wigan to Liverpool, and taking cotton from Liverpool docks to Leeds.

In 2006 it was the first boat to have been legged through Standedge Tunnel in 60 years. A UK Government minister and a local Member of Parliament took turns at legging Maria through the highest, longest, and deepest canal tunnel in the UK.

== See also ==
- Experiment (horse-powered boat)
- Flatboat
- Horseboating Society
- Narrowboat
- Team boat
- Trekschuit (horse-drawn boat in the Netherlands)
