= Disabled Sailors Association =

Registered charity in Hampshire, England

The Disabled Sailors Association (DSA) also known as the Thomas Morley Trust, is a registered charity in Hampshire, England. It was set up in 1993 to provide ocean sailing for disabled people in its purpose-designed cruising yachts and inland dinghy sailing in Martin 16 keelboats and WETA trimarans. DSA evolved into an umbrella or holding charity for various projects.

== RoRo sailing project ==
Since 1995 RoRo has provided ocean sailing facilities for disabled people. The funds were raised through Grant Making Trusts, enabling the design and construction of two 11-meter wheelchair accessible ocean cruising yachts: Spirit of Scott Bader and Verity K. Both yachts are based in Portsmouth.

== Martin16 sailing ==
Canadian-designed and built dinghies are common in North America, but were unknown in Europe until DSA started importing them. The Martin16 provides access to inland waters for disabled and disadvantaged people. They are used for British Paralympic team practice, and as a training boat for disabled engaged on ambitious long range sailing projects.

== WETA trimaran ==
The WETA trimaran was launched in New Zealand in 2007. The boat is lightweight, easily rigged and is the size of a Laser for storage. The WETA trimaran class allows seats and alternative steering to be fitted and is suited for sailing by mature, disabled or very young people.

DSA boats provide:

- facilities for any disability including wheelchair users and those needing blow and suck controls
- day sailing on wheelchair accessible yachts
- long-distance cruising
- dinghy sailing on dinghies fitted with seats
- dinghy racing at international level
