= Electric Boat Association =

Boating society in the United Kingdom

The Electric Boat Association (EBA) is an organisation established in London in 1982. It was the first such national association and is the largest organisation in the world dedicated to electric boats and boating.

== History ==
The Electric Boat Association (EBA) was established in London in 1982 and is the largest organisation in the world dedicated to electric boats and boating. It was the first such national association and has been followed by associations in France, Greece, Norway, Netherlands, Switzerland, Canada and United States

== Operations ==
=== Governance and organisation ===
The Electric Boat Association is constituted as a member-led, not-for-profit, unincorporated body.

=== Aims and activities ===
The Association aims to promote electric boats and innovation in both engineering, battery technology and charging points. The EBA organises and participates in boat shows and rallies throughout the UK and Europe.

=== Publications ===
The EBA members magazine “Electric Boat Interactive” is produced as both a paper magazine and online.

=== Challenges and records ===
The Electric Boat Association has in the past promoted and encouraged competitions, challenges and records of speed and distance.
