= Seagull Trust Cruises =

Waterway society and Scottish charity

- Formation: November 21, 1978; 47 years ago
- Type: Charity
- Purpose: Free Canal Cruising in Scotland for People with Special Needs
- Website: seagulltrust.org.uk
- Formerly called: Seagull Trust

Seagull Trust Cruises (formerly Seagull Trust) is a waterway society and Scottish charity. Formed in 1978, it offers free canal cruising for disabled and disadvantaged persons and groups.

11,446 disabled people went on a cruise in 2002.

== See also ==
- List of waterway societies in the United Kingdom
