= Waterway society =

Type of organization

A waterway society is a society, association, charitable trust, club, trust or "friends" group involved in the restoration, preservation, use and enjoyment of waterways, e.g. a canal, river, navigation or other waterway, and their associated buildings and structures, e.g. locks, tunnels, etc.

== See also ==
- List of waterway societies in the United Kingdom
- List of waterway societies in Ireland
- List of maritime museums in the United States
