= Montgomery Dinghy Dawdle =

Event heard annually between 1985 and 2011

The Montgomery Dinghy Dawdle was an event held annually between 1985 and 2011 to promote use and awareness of the Montgomery Canal, and to highlight the road bridges which had been lowered. It involved unpowered craft such as dinghies, canoes and coracles travelling along the canal. Early events involved stopping the traffic and carrying boats over a road where a low bridge prevented using the canal. Increasing difficulty with supervising this aspect of the event led to it being held on sections that did not involve crossing roads, and so it became a social event, rather than a campaigning tool. This led the organisers, the Shropshire Union Canal Society, to cancel the event after 2011, but the Friends of the Montgomery Canal took it over, and turned it into a triathlon, with cycling, walking or running, and paddling, covering the whole length of the canal.

== History ==
The Montgomery Dinghy Dawdle was first held in 1985, and was seen as a way to highlight the problem of bridges which had been lowered, thus preventing navigation, and to show the public that the canal could be used by boats. Mary Awcock, the founder of the event, stated at the time that "It is important to demonstrate that a restored canal will provide a valuable local and tourist amenity." The first event covered a stretch of canal either side of Gallowstree Bridge in Welshpool, which had been lowered and carried the A483 road over the canal. Some 30 boats took part, and when they got to the Bridge, volunteers stopped the traffic while all of the boats were carried across the road. Leaflets were given to the waiting drivers, and the event was a success, with good coverage in local newspapers and on the radio.

The following three events all focused on Gallowstree Bridge or Whitehouse Bridge, dropped bridges which were either side of Welshpool. The events appeared to be having the required impact, and in late 1988, Mary Awcock announced that the fifth Dinghy Dawdle, to be held in 1989, would be the final one, as there would be no more road bridges around which boats needed to be portaged. Her optimism was caused by the fact the British Waterways Board had obtained an Act of Parliament undoing the abandonment order of 1944, and allowing them to reinstate the entire canal. Grant aid was available from the European Union, with half of the total cost of £32 million needing to be raised locally. The project had the support of Powys County Council, Montgomeryshire District Council, the Welsh Tourist Board and the Mid-Wales Development Board. However, because of the amount of money involved, the approval of the Welsh Office was required, and this was refused by the Secretary of State for Wales, Peter Walker, in December 1988.

The fifth Dinghy Dawdle was therefore not the last, as more campaigning was needed. Gallowstree Bridge was rebuilt to allow navigation in 1992, and was officially opened by David Suchet at the eighth rally, while Whitehouse Bridge was rebuilt in 1995, and the 1996 Dinghy Dawdle was able to pass under it with ease. With the Welshpool section making good progress by 1997, the organisers looked at holding future Dinghy Dawdles on other stretches of the canal, again with the main aim of highlighting lowered bridges, but there have been occasions when progress was celebrated. Thus the 2002 Dawdle included the reopening of Brynderwen Lock by Janet Lewis-Jones, a board member at British Waterways, and the 2003 event was held on the newly-reopened stretch of canal from Gronwen Wharf to Queen's Head. The 2001 event had to be cancelled due to an epidemic of foot-and-mouth disease.

The 2004 and 2005 events were held on the Welshpool section, with the aim of reminding the public that boats bring a canal back to life. A total of 65 boats took part in the 2005 Dawdle, paddling from Welshpool to Burgedin. The following year saw Lembit Öpik, the Member of Parliament for Montgomeryshire, performing an opening ceremony at Newhouse Lock, on the section to the south of the Welshpool section. The aims of the event remained the same: to demonstrate the benefits of a functioning canal, and raise awareness of the need to reinstate bridges. In 2010, there were still ten that needed raising, of which five carried the A483 over the canal.

=== Triathlon ===
In 2011, the 26th and final Dinghy Dawdle event was held. 14 of the participants withdrew at the last minute due to inclement weather, but 29 boats took part. There had been increasing difficulty with supervising the crossing of roads in the latter years, and so the event tended to stick to sections where this was not necessary. It thus became more of a social event, rather than a campaigning tool, and so the Shropshire Union Canal Society took the decision to stop holding it. The Friends of the Montgomery Canal took it over in 2012, turning it into a triathlon with cycling, running or walking, but with paddling instead of swimming, and covering the whole length of the canal. Initially, the course involved cycling from Newtown to Welshpool, paddling from there to Llanymynech, and then walking to Frankton. By 2015, the composition of the event had been changed somewhat, with the first 17 miles (27 km) from Newtown to Pool Quay completed on a bicycle, along part of the Aberystwyth to Shrewsbury cycle route. The next 10.5 miles (17 km) was completed by walking or running, and included part of Offa's Dyke as well as crossing Vyrnwy Aqueduct. The final 7.5 miles (12 km) involved paddling, with the boats being carried around the three Aston Locks and the Graham Palmer Lock, which commemorates Graham Palmer, one of the founders of the Waterway Recovery Group. There were over 230 participants for the 2015 event, with 170 covering the full distance of 35 miles (56 km).

=== Precursors ===
The use of small boats to highlight the plight of the canal was not new when the first Dinghy Dawdle was held. The canal had been officially abandoned by an Act of Abandonment obtained by the London, Midland and Scottish Railway in 1944, although it had effectively been closed since 1936, when a breach occurred near Frankton Junction, which was never repaired. However, a trip along the whole canal was organised by Bill Thisthlewaite just after the end of the Second World War. He was a member of the fledgling Inland Waterways Association, and two boats took part, travelling along the Llangollen Canal and obtaining a toll ticket for the Montgomery section at Ellesmere, despite the fact that the canal was officially derelict. A horse and cart were used to carry the boats around the breached section.

Subsequently, there were a series of seven Dinghy Rallies held at Welshpool, between 1970 and 1976. They were part of a one-day event, held in September, which featured stalls and a fairground, in addition to a range of races and competitions for owners of canoes or dinghies. Larger boats were encouraged to attend the final two rallies, and a number of trailed boats were brought to the canal, generating good publicity. British Waterways, the owner of the canal at the time, helped to organise two further rallies in the early 1980s.

== Organisation ==
The event was organised by the Shropshire Union Canal Society, with help from the Friends of the Montgomery Canal, part of the Montgomery Waterway Restoration Trust, and supported by British Waterways. It involved unpowered craft such as dinghies, canoes and coracles travelling along the canal, and being carried across roads at some points where bridges had been lowered.

In 2007 the dawdle was between Burgedin Locks and Llanymynech Wharf. It took place on Sunday, 10 June 2007.

The 2008 dawdle took place on Sunday, 8 June 2008, starting at Redwith Bridge and ending at Queen's Head.

The 2009 dawdle took place on Sunday, 7 June 2009, starting at Garthmyl and ending at Freestone Lock.

The 2010 dawdle took place on Sunday, 13 June 2010, starting at Berriew with a lunch stop at Belan Locks and ending at Welshpool. After the boaters were welcomed by Derrick and Mary Awcock, who instigated the first dawdle in 1985, the local MP Glyn Davies started the event. This was the 25th time it had been run, and over 70 craft took part.

== See also ==
- Canals of the United Kingdom
- History of the British canal system
