= Waterway restoration =

Activity of restoring a canal or river

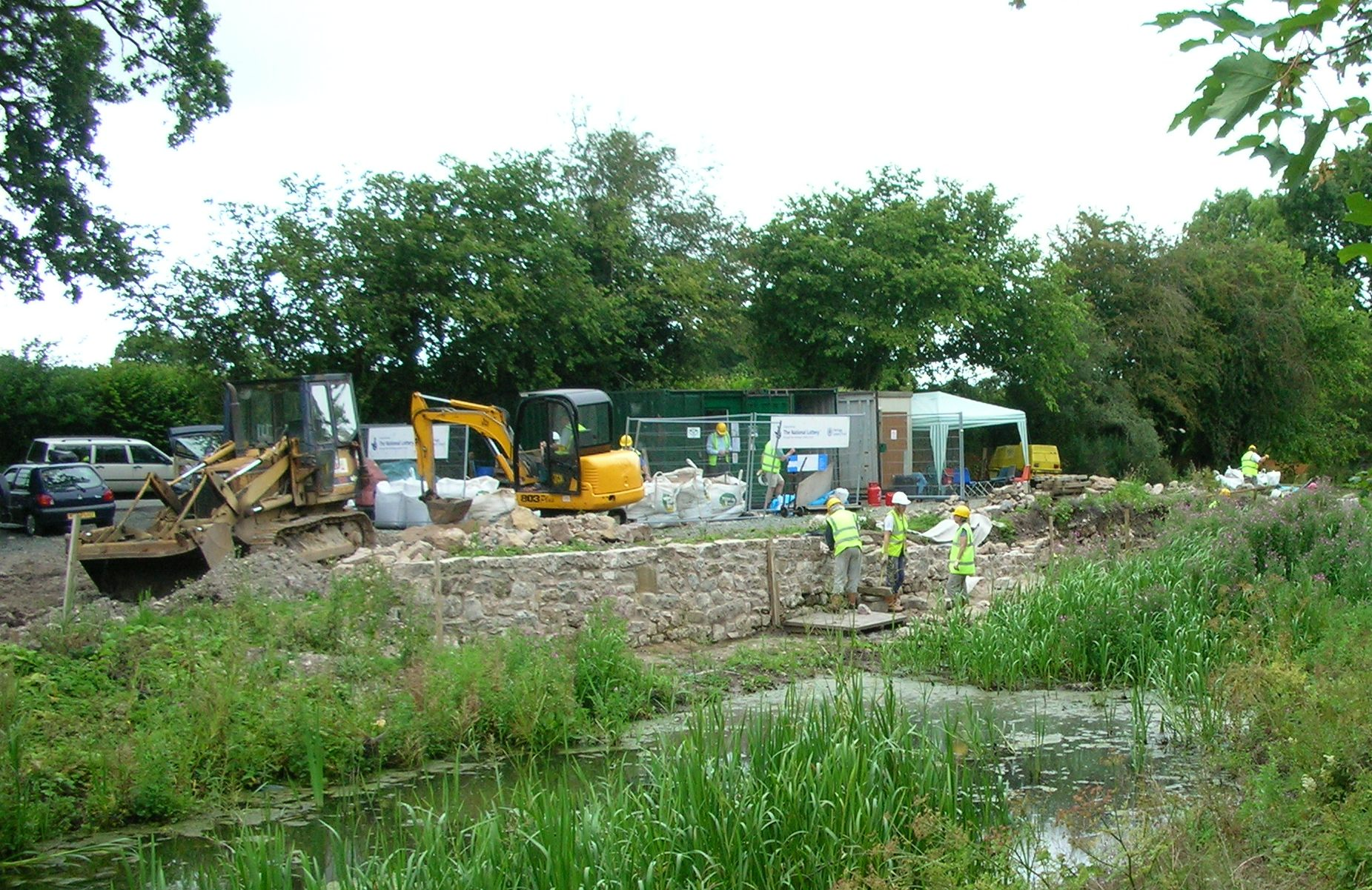
Part of the Montgomery Canal undergoing restoration

Waterway restoration is the activity of restoring a canal or river, including special features such as warehouse buildings, locks, boat lifts, and boats. It focuses on creating and restoring habitats for biodiversity, ecological function, and improving quality of life.

In the United Kingdom, Canada, and United States, the focus of waterway restoration is on improving navigability, while in Australia the term may also include improvements to water quality. The primary purpose for waterway restoration is to improve biodiversity loss and create a self-sustaining ecosystem. Waterway restoration information in developing countries is limited.

== Urban waterway restoration ==
Urban waterway restoration focuses on restoring waterways in neighborhoods and communities. Each restoration project has different goals. Examples include flood control, water quality, or habitat restoration–it is not limited to these three. Waterway restoration in urban areas create sustainable urban places.

Urban waterway restoration plays a part in environmental justice. Urban water in need of restoration tend to be in low-income communities due to industrial waterfront development causing pollution. Other risks include storm surge and sea levels rising.

Constructed wetlands can be used to restored degraded urban waterways. The precipitation levels throughout seasons change the amount of water flow the waterways receive. The hydrological variability affects the amount of nutrients the water receives.

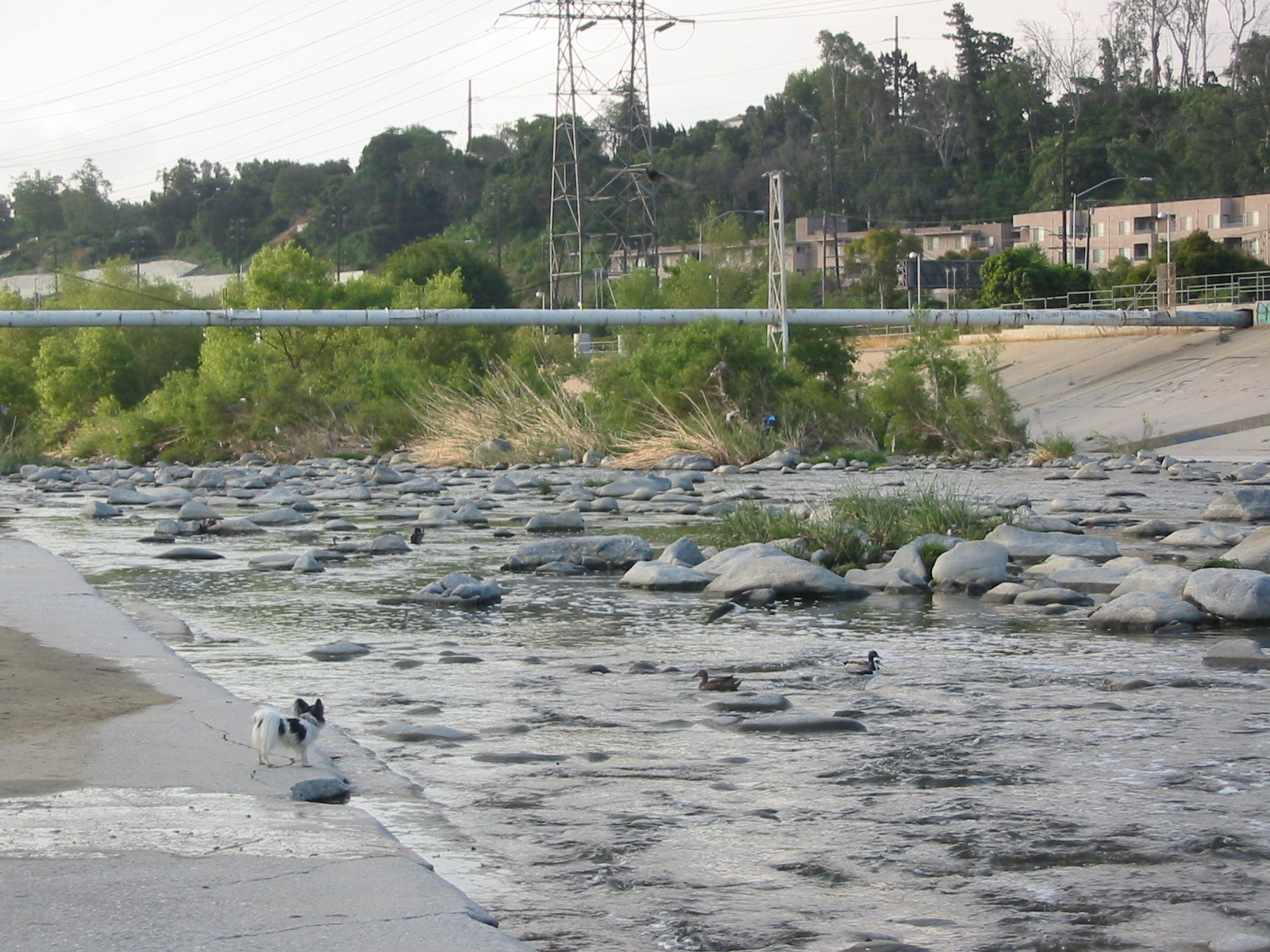
Above is a small section of the LA River. The LA River is undergoing multiple projects to improve biodiversity and recreational uses as part of the LA River Revitalization project.

=== Urban river restoration ===
Urban rivers contain biodiversity, control flooding, and support communities. Restoration of these areas often include re-establishing the natural floodplains in the area to reduce the risk of flooding.

Healthy rivers create ecosystems that are effective carbon sinks. These ecosystems also regulate local temperatures. River restorations improve water quality in urban areas that are usually polluted from contaminated runoff.

==== LA River Revitalization Project ====
The LA River Revitalization Project aims to restore about 11 miles of the Los Angeles River by re-establishing a self-sustaining ecosystem. It aims to reintroduce historic floodplains for flood risk management. It also aims to create recreational opportunities by widening areas and improving the ecosystem.

== Waterway restoration in developing countries ==
Due to the information gaps and lack of water quality data, waterway restoration in developing countries is behind. A lack of water quality data gives insufficient information to know the extent of water pollution. Without data, restoration methods are difficult to determine.

Implementing environmental policies to aid in the restoration of their waterways falls short because of lack of resources, infrastructure, and economic capacity. Majority of successful waterway restoration projects occur in developing countries.

== Waterway restoration in Canada ==
Canada has a goal of wetland restoration to increase both water access and biodiversity. The country wants to improve and support their ecosystems in order to maintain their sustainable communities. Their motives are also led by opportunities for recreational uses. Canadian citizens have stepped-up in aiding restoration efforts.

Canal waterway restoration in Canada is implemented as a way to preserve and restore historic canals. The purpose is for both recreational uses such as boating and kayaking. It is also for tourism purposes.

=== Shubenacadie Canal ===
The Shubenacadie Canal Commission was formed in 1986 to oversee the future of this waterway. Locks three and five have been restored, water levels in the connecting lakes have been stabilized and a visitor center opened. The ten-year business plan for 2007-2016 aims to save four more locks and rebuild four water control structures to make the route open for small boats from Lake Banook to the village of Shubenacadie.

=== Soulanges Canal ===
The Soulanges Canal closed in 1958. Today there are plans to reopen the canal to pleasure boats. The mission of the Régie intermunicipale du canal de Soulanges is to manage the development of tourism development as part of the reopening of the canal.

== Waterway restoration in Finland ==
Finland has a motive for restoring it's waterways–keeping the waters clean for biodiversity and recreational uses. They also aim to prepare their rivers for flood protection to prevent future harm to the ecosystem.

=== Suvorov military canals ===
Suvorov military canals (Suvorov canals) are series of four open canals on Saimaa Lake in Finland. Apart from the Kutvele canal, the other three canals spent 200 years almost untouched from the early 19th century until 2003, when the Finnish National Board of Antiquities began restoration works on them. Now they have been turned into tourist attractions.

=== Tar canals ===
The tar canals in Kajaani were canals and locks built to pass the Koivukoski and Ämmäkoski rapids. First used in 1846, the locks were vital in the transportation of wood pine tar to Oulu. The worn-down canals were closed in 1915. The refurbished Ämmäkoski lock was re-opened in 1984, but the Koivukoski canal has been totally dismantled and the site now houses a hydroelectric power plant. The refurbished canal is not used for transport, but in the summertime, tar boat shows are organised for tourists.

== Waterway restoration in the United Kingdom ==
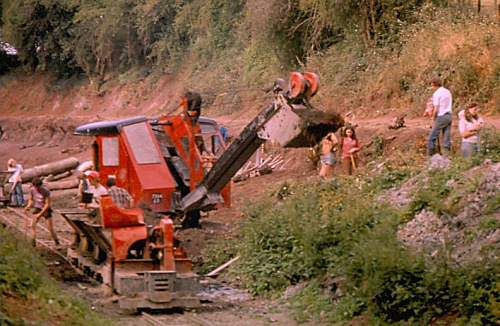
Excavation work at Salwarpe on the Droitwich Canal during 1978 Waterway Recovery Group summer work camp.

Due to competition from the railways and the narrow design of most UK canals (which prevented the carriage of economically sized bulk loads), large parts of the UK's canal system were abandoned in the late 19th and early 20th centuries. The rise of the leisure industry in the 1950s meant that the complete abandonment of the remaining canals was avoided.

The increasing use of canals for leisure purposes led some people to consider restoring some of those that had been abandoned. At first, progress was slow due to the lack of funding, with most of the work having to be done manually by volunteers.

As the leisure industry grew, the economic benefits of having a canal became more apparent and some state funding started to appear. At the same time, public interest increased the size of various volunteer groups.

At the present time, canal restoration in the UK is carried out by a mixture of volunteers and professionals working on a large variety of projects.

=== Waterways under restoration in the United Kingdom ===
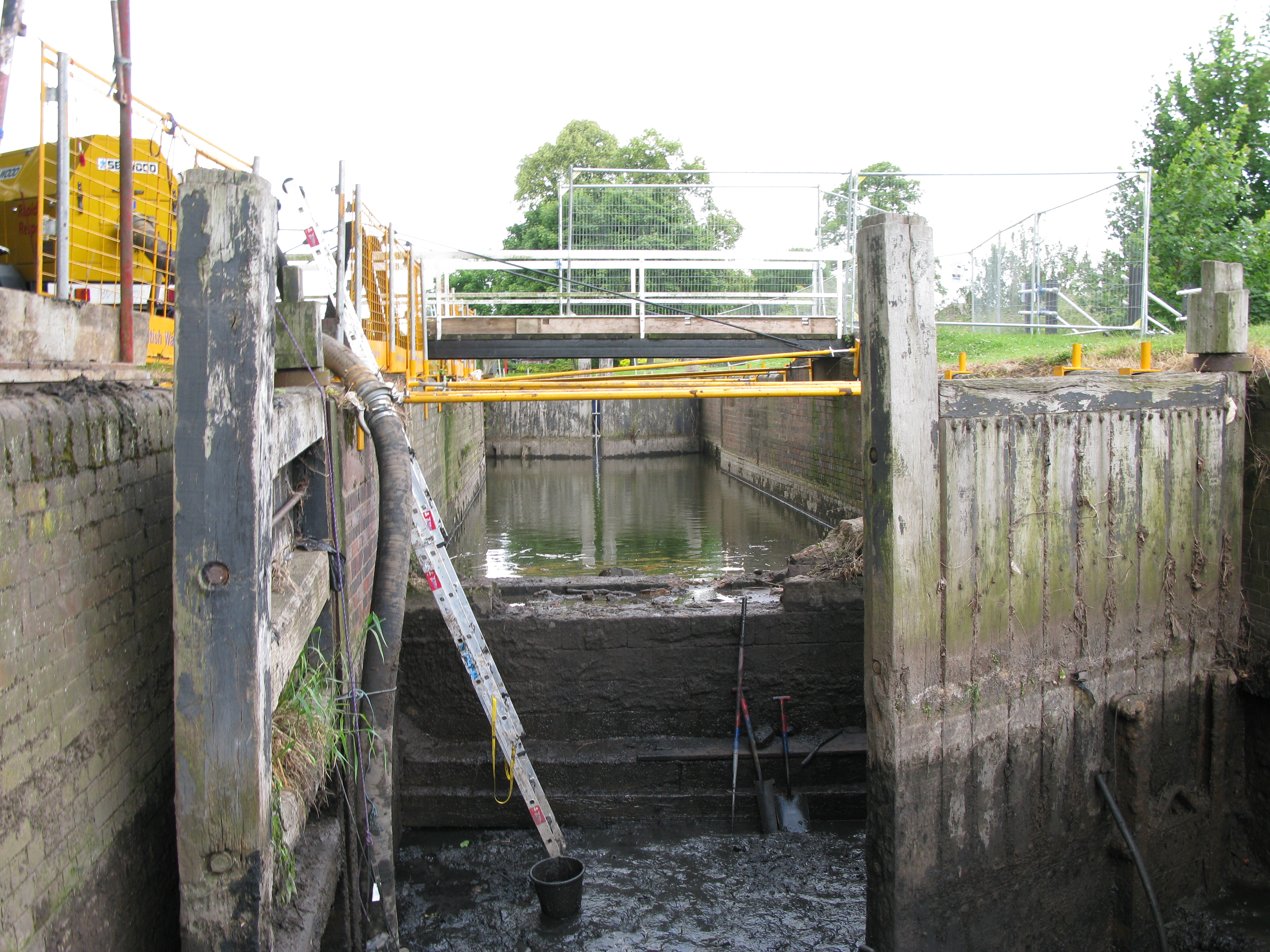
A lock on the Droitwich Canal undergoing restoration

- Buckingham Arm
- Chesterfield Canal
- Chichester Canal
- Cromford Canal
- Dearne and Dove Canal
- Derby Canal
- Grand Western Canal
- Grantham Canal
- Hatherton Canal
- Hereford and Gloucester Canal
- Lancaster Canal
- Lapal Canal (Dudley No 2 Canal)
- Lichfield Canal
- Liskeard and Looe Union Canal
- Manchester, Bolton and Bury Canal
- Monmouthshire and Brecon Canal
- Montgomery Canal
- Pocklington Canal
- Rolle Canal
- Sleaford Navigation
- Stroudwater Navigation
- Thames and Severn Canal
- Wendover Arm Canal
- Wey and Arun Canal
- Wilts and Berks Canal

=== Waterway restoration groups in the United Kingdom ===
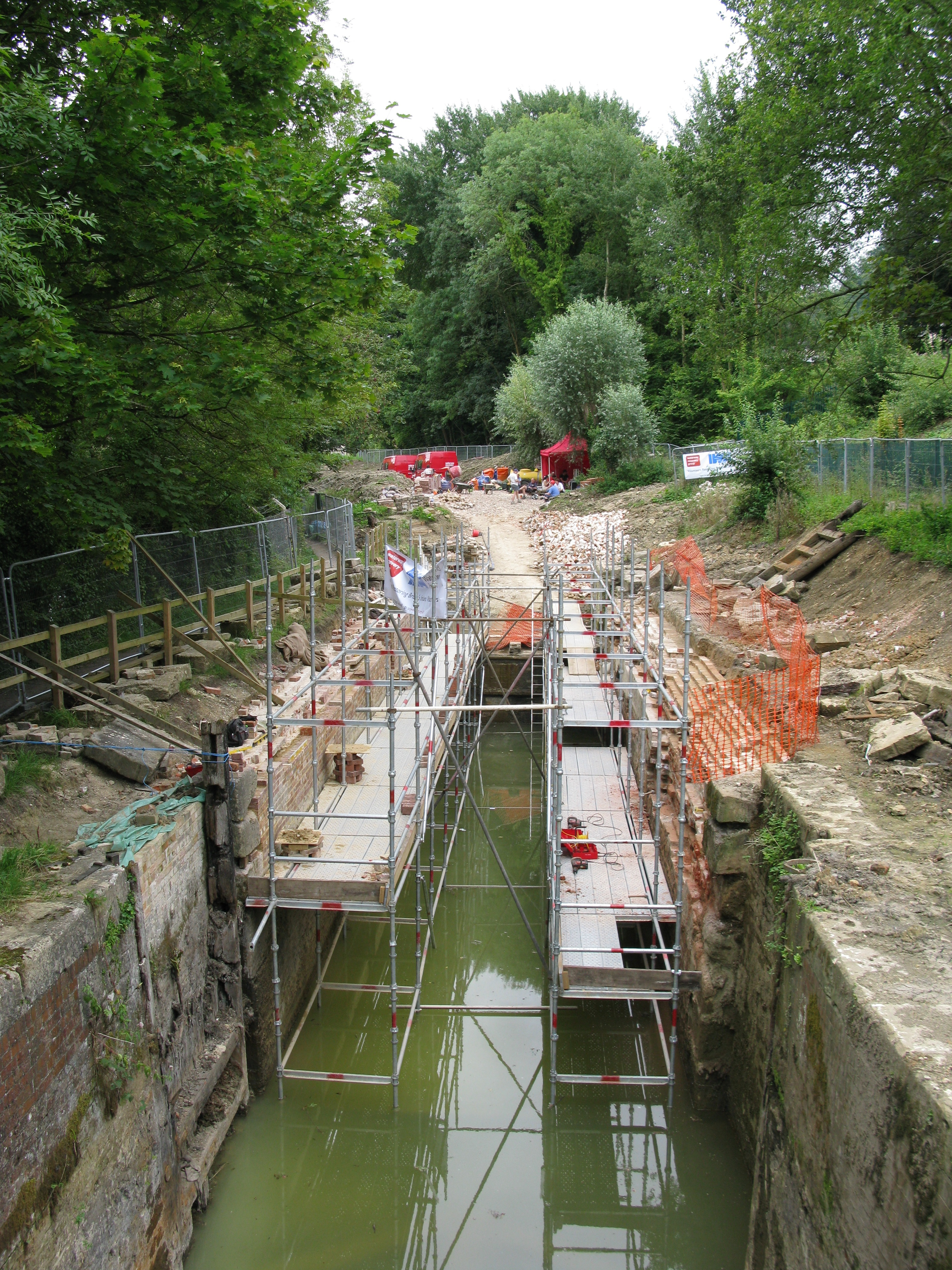
Gough's Orchard lock on the Thames & Severn Canal undergoing restoration by Waterway Recovery Group

- Waterway Recovery Group
- Buckingham Canal Society
- Cotswold Canals Trust
- Inland Waterways Protection Society
- Kent and East Sussex Canal Restoration Group
- Montgomery Waterway Restoration Trust
- River Stour Trust, Suffolk, England
- Shrewsbury & Newport Canals Trust
- Somerset Waterways Development Trust
- Wendover Arm Trust
- Wilts & Berks Canal Trust
- List of waterway societies in the United Kingdom

=== Completed restoration schemes in the United Kingdom ===
Waterways are listed in chronological order of re-opening. Most have been completely re-opened, but some (such as the Grand Western Canal and Basingstoke Canal) are only partially complete but have no current plans for work on the rest of the line.

- Lower Avon 1962
- Southern Stratford canal 1964
- Stourbridge Canal 1967
- Grand Western Canal 1971
- Upper Avon 1974
- Peak Forest Canal 1974
- Caldon Canal 1974
- Ashton Canal 1974
- River Great Ouse 1978
- Kennet and Avon Canal 1990
- Basingstoke Canal 1991
- Bridgwater and Taunton Canal 1994
- Huddersfield Narrow Canal 2001
- Union Canal 2001
- Rochdale Canal 2002
- Droitwich Canal 2011

== See also ==
- History of the British canal system
- The Helix (Falkirk)
- Shannon–Erne Waterway
- Waterways in the United Kingdom
- World Canals Conference
