= Naomi Blumenthal =

Israeli politician (born 1943)

- נעמי בלומנטל
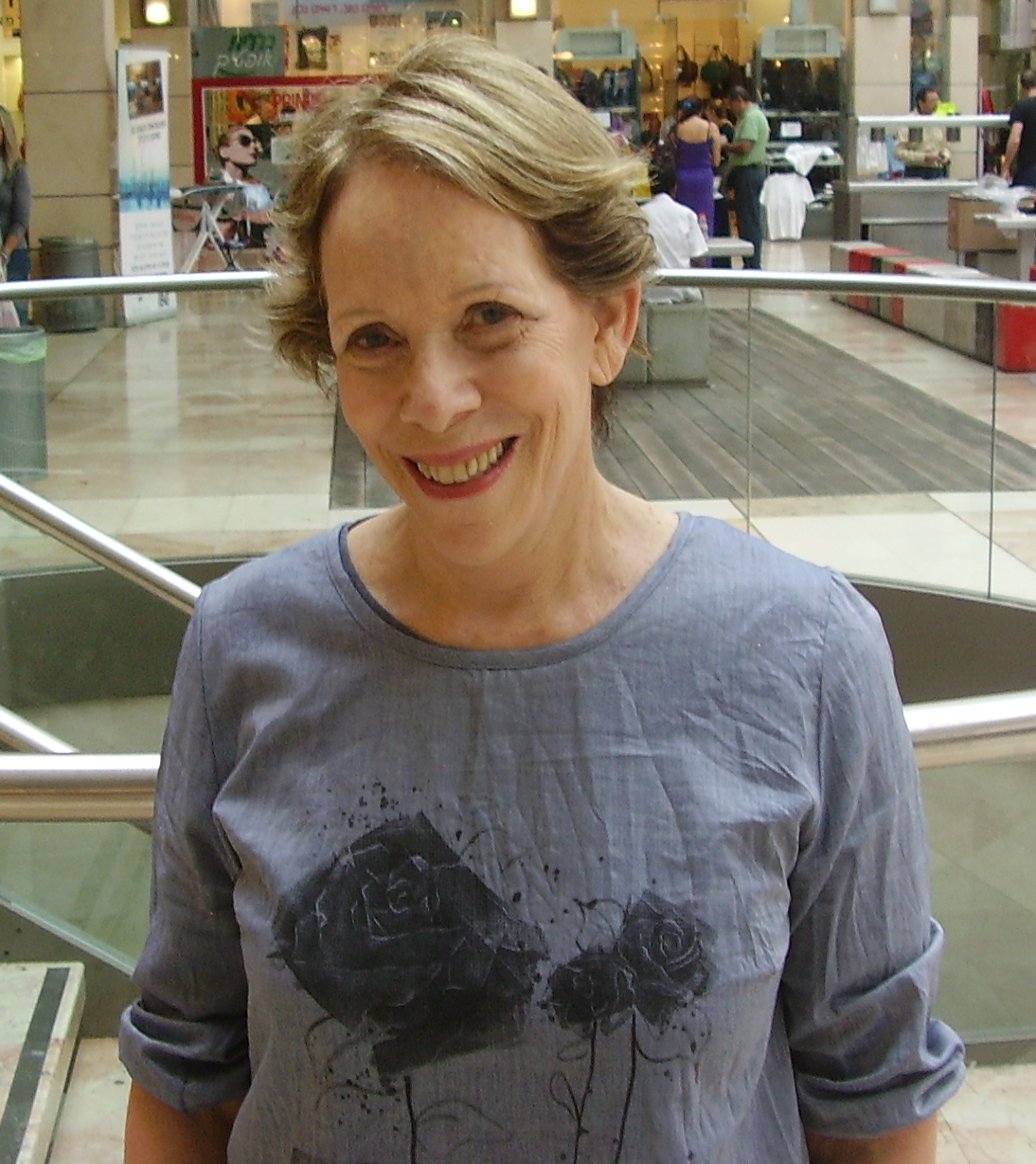

Faction represented in the Knesset
- 1992–2006: Likud

Personal details
- Born: 22 November 1943 (age 82) Bitzaron, Mandatory Palestine

Naomi Blumenthal (Hebrew: נעמי בלומנטל; born 22 November 1943) is a former Israeli politician. First elected to the Knesset in 1992, her political career was ended by a conviction for corruption in 2006.

== Biography ==
Born in Bitzaron during the Mandate era, Blumenthal served in a Nahal brigade during her national service. She gained a BA in Political Science and Criminology from Bar-Ilan University and also graduated from the Beit Zvi School of Art in Ramat Gan.

Blumenthal was one of the founders of the Beersheba theatre and chaired the Al-Sam anti-drug abuse association. She is also a former chairwoman of the Political Centre - Israel Women's Network, and was a member of the Israeli delegation to the United Nations Conference on the Status of Women in 1989, 1990, 1991 and 1995.

In 1992 she was elected to the Knesset on Likud's list. After retaining her seat in 1996 and 1999, she was appointed Deputy Minister of National Infrastructure by Ariel Sharon in 2001. She served as chairwoman of the Worldwide Likud Movement between 2001 and 2002, and stepped down from the cabinet in January 2003.

Although re-elected in 2003, it later emerged that she had bribed 15 Likud activists and central committee members during the party primaries in December 2003 by hosting them in a hotel in Ramat Gan. The episode became known as the "Sheraton City Tower Affair".

Criticised by the judge for using her right to silence, she was sentenced to eight months in prison, a ten-month suspended sentence and was fined NIS 75,000. She appealed against the verdict, but lost. However, in July 2007 President Shimon Peres commuted her sentence to community service, though she was not pardoned. The Movement for Quality Government appealed Peres' decision, but their petition was rejected by the Knesset.

== See also ==
- List of Israeli public officials convicted of crimes or misdemeanors
