= World Conference =

World Conference may refer to:

- Mennonite World Conference, a global community of Anabaptist churches
- Pentecostal World Conference, a global fellowship of Pentecostal believers and denominations
- World Canals Conference, an annual conference about canals and other waterways worldwide established 1988
- World Climate Conference, a series of international meetings organized by the World Meteorological Organization
- World Conference (Community of Christ), the highest legislative body in the Community of Christ
- World Conference (World Association of Girl Guides and Girl Scouts)
- World Conference against Racism, a series of meetings established in 1978, convened by UNESCO
- World Conference of Religions for Peace
- World Conference on Breeding Endangered Species in Captivity as an Aid to their Survival
- World Conference on Disaster Reduction, a 2005 meeting convened by the United Nations
- World Conference on Human Rights, a 1993 meeting convened by the United Nations
- World Conference on Women (disambiguation), a series of meetings established 1975, convened by the United Nations
- World Food Conference, a 1974 meeting convened by the United Nations
- World Internet Conference
- World Radiocommunication Conference, to review and revise radio regulations
- World Religions Conference
- World Sanskrit Conference
- World Scout Conference, the governing body of the World Organization of the Scout Movement
- World Telugu Conference
- World Unity Conference

== See also ==
- World Assembly
