= Montgomery Waterway Restoration Trust =

British registered charity

Montgomery Waterway Restoration Trust is a British registered charity, number 510448, which exists to promote the restoration of the Montgomery Canal.

== History ==
The first efforts to restore the Montgomery Canal were made by the Shropshire Union Canal Society in 1968, when the section in Welshpool was restored. Further progress towards restoration was made in 1980, when the concept of a restored canal was written into the Shropshire and Powys County Structure Plan. Seven years later, British Waterways obtained an act of parliament to authorise the restoration. This was the first occurrence of such an Act being granted. With the need to co-ordinate a number of authorities and manage applications for grants to fund the work, an umbrella organisation was needed, and so the Montgomery Waterway Restoration Trust was created.

The Trust was formed in 1980 and its members include:

- Inland Waterways Association
- Montgomeryshire Wildlife Trust
- Powys County Council
- The Prince's Trust
- Shropshire Council
- Shropshire Union Canal Society
- Shropshire Wildlife Trust
- Waterway Recovery Group

"Friends of the Montgomery Canal" is a less formal group, created by the Trust for people living in the canal corridor, which provides them with information and opportunities for involvement in various canal-related activities. The Friends organises events including the annual Montgomery Dinghy Dawdle, which provides an opportunity for a large number of people in unpowered boats such as canoes and coracles to explore a section of the canal, and generates publicity for future restoration. The event is jointly organised with the Shropshire Union Canal Society.

== Activity ==
One of the first big tests for the new organisation occurred in 1982, after the Powys Structure Plan had included a clause protecting the canal north of Whitehorse Bridge No. 120. Just three weeks later, the British Waterways Board announced that they would not be starting any more work on the canal once the existing work at Frankton and Carreghofa was completed. They declared that restoration of the whole canal was uncertain, and that no water for it would be available from the Llangollen Canal. The Trust then requested a meeting with Sir Frank Price, the chairman of the BWB, and the two organisations agreed on the need for an economic study, which would inform future development plans. The meeting was held on 5 April, and the report was to be completed by October of that year.

== See also ==
- Canals of the United Kingdom
- History of the British canal system
- Shropshire Union Canal Society

== Bibliography ==
- Arnold, Harry (2003). The Montgomery Canal and its Restoration. Tempus Publishing. ISBN 978-0-7524-1660-1.
- Squires, Roger (2008). Britain's restored canals. Landmark Publishing. ISBN 978-1-84306-331-5.
