= Affairs Council =

Affairs Council may refer to:

- General Affairs and External Affairs Council, one of the oldest configurations of the Council of the European Union
- Mainland Affairs Council, a cabinet-level administrative agency under the Executive Yuan of the Republic of China
- Minnesota Indian Affairs Council, a liaison between the government of Minnesota and the Native American tribes in the state of Minnesota

== See also ==
- Public Affairs Council (disambiguation)
- World Affairs Council (disambiguation)
