= Shrewsbury & Newport Canals Trust =

The Shrewsbury & Newport Canals Trust is a waterway society and a registered charity which exists to promote the restoration of the Shrewsbury Canal and the Newport Arm of the Shropshire Union Canal. The trust was created in 2000.

== History ==
In 1964, reports appeared in local newspapers that the British Waterways Board intended to drain part of the Newport Branch which had been officially closed since 1944. The North-Western branch of the Inland Waterways Association suggested that a local group should be set up to campaign for the restoration of the canal and the Shrewsbury and Newport Canal Association was formed in December 1964 to pursue that aim. Following the rejection of their initial plans, the group became the Shropshire Union Canal Society and then spearheaded the restoration of the Montgomery Canal which had also been part of the Shropshire Union network.

Over 30 years later, the Shrewsbury and Newport Canals Trust revived the vision for the restoration of the Shrewsbury Canal and the Newport Arm. It was registered with Companies House on 21 September 2000 as a private company, limited by guarantee and with no share capital, and has the company number of 4075920. It is also a charity, number 1088706, registered with the Charity Commission. The aims are stated to be the restoration of the Shrewsbury Canal and the Newport Arm of the Shropshire Union Canal, including its structures and building, for the public good.

== Activities ==
In 2001, the Trust produced a document entitled "The Shrewsbury and Newport Canals - A case for restoration", which they circulated to the five local authorities who manage the areas through which the canals run. The local authorities are the County Councils of Staffordshire and Shropshire, Stafford Borough Council, and Telford and Wrekin Council. They specifically asked that the councils should give support in principle to the aim of restoration, including working with the Trust and with the other affected local authorities, should support the production of a feasibility study into the restoration, and should use planning powers to protect the line of the canal. Stafford Borough Council's consideration of the report listed ten benefits to the community which would arise from the restoration.

The report was well received by the local authorities, all of whom gave their support in principle. The feasibility study was commissioned in 2003, and Alun Michael MP, the Waterways Minister, presented the findings in 2004, which concluded that full restoration was both technically possible from an engineering point of view, and economically viable. The estimated cost for full restoration is £86 million.

In 2007, the Wappenshall canal basin and warehouse were put up for sale. The Trust campaigned for it to be purchased and restored, rather than turned into flats, for which outline planning permission existed. In June 2008, Telford and Wrekin Council agreed to fund the purchase of the site, allowing the Trust to concentrate on its restoration, rather than trying to raise the money for its purchase.

== See also ==
- List of waterway societies in the United Kingdom

== Bibliography ==
- Cumberlidge, Jane (2009). Inland Waterways of Great Britain (8th Ed.). Imray Laurie Norie and Wilson. ISBN 978-1-84623-010-3.
- Squires, Roger (2008). Britain's restored canals. Landmark Publishing. ISBN 978-1-84306-331-5.
