= World Buddhist Council =

World Buddhist Council may refer to:

- Buddhist councils, History of Buddhist Councils
- World Buddhist Sangha Council, Ecumenic Organization

== See also ==
- World Council (disambiguation)
