= Waterways in the United Kingdom =

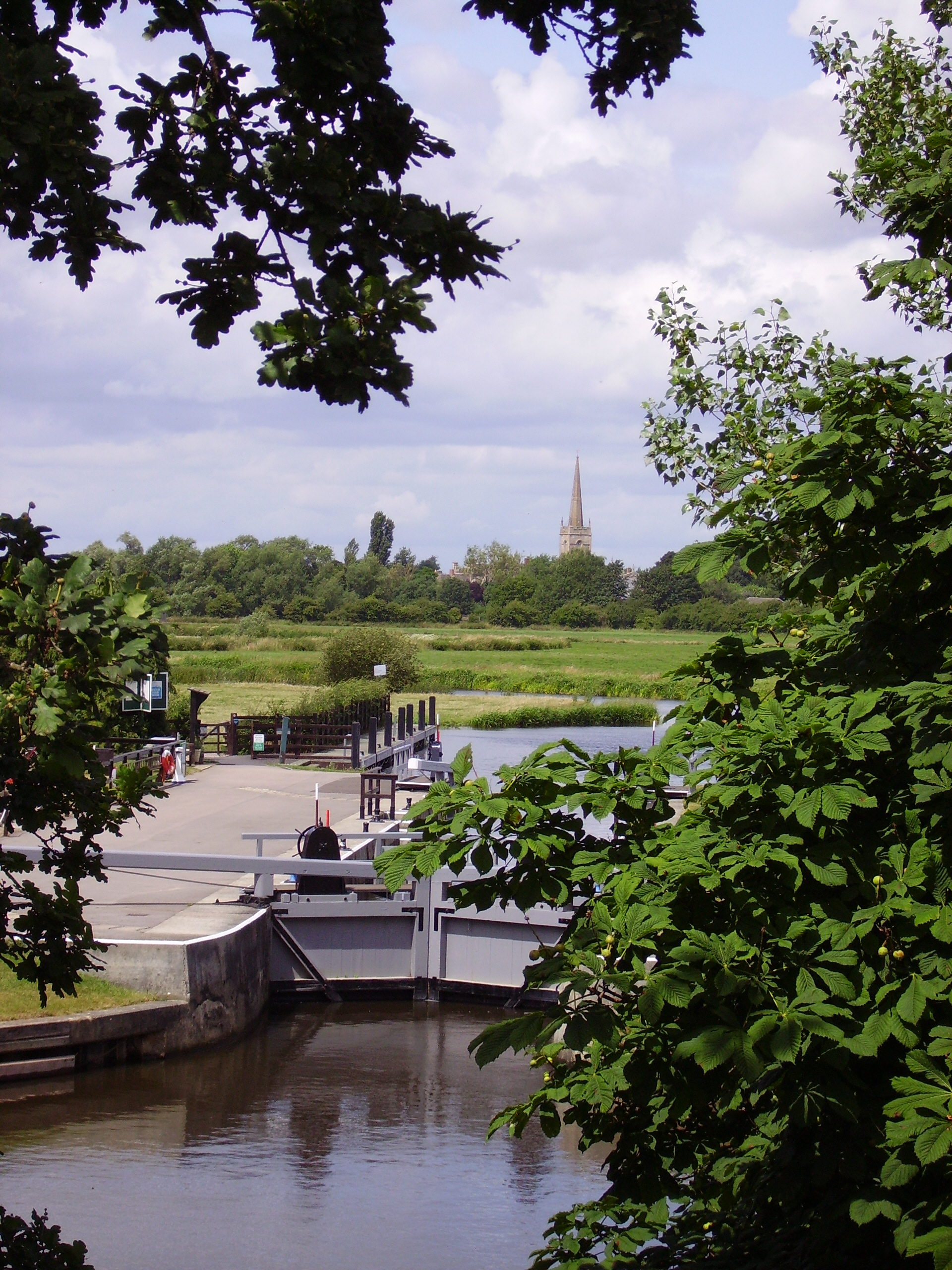
St John's Lock and Lechlade in background (River Thames).

Water transport played a vital role in the UK's industrial development. The beginning of the 19th century saw a move from roads to waterways, (i.e. canals, rivers, firths, and estuaries).

== Rivers in the United Kingdom ==
Major navigable rivers include the Humber, Mersey, Yorkshire Ouse, Severn, Thames and Trent. Some minor navigable rivers may be classified as canals. Others include the Warwickshire Avon, the Bristol Avon.

There are also the subterranean rivers of London, and the Jubilee River, which, although man-made, was designed to look and act like a natural river rather than a canal.

== Canals in the United Kingdom ==
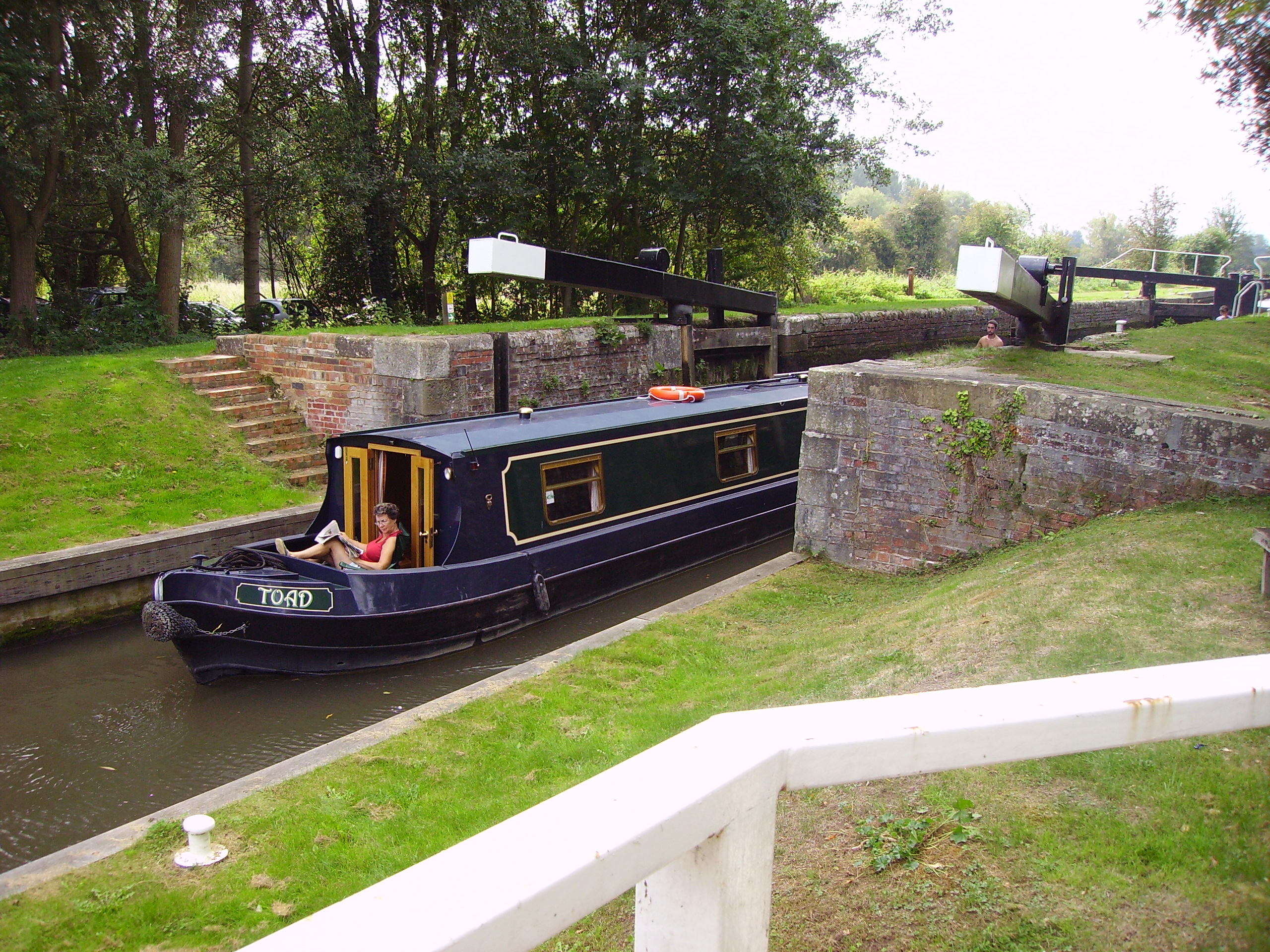
Sulhamstead Tyle Mill Lock (Kennet & Avon Canal).

The canals of the United Kingdom are a major part of the network of inland waterways. They are used for irrigation and transport and were a key part of the Industrial Revolution. Today, they are also used for recreational boating.

== Statistics ==
Domestic freight transport in UK by mode (tonne kirometer)

== See also ==
- British Waterways Waterscape
- Canal & River Trust
- Inland Waterways Association
- Falkirk Helix
- Geography of the United Kingdom
- List of navigation authorities in the United Kingdom
- List of waterway societies in the United Kingdom
- World Canals Conference
