= World Affairs Council =

World Affairs Council may refer to:

- Los Angeles World Affairs Council
- San Diego World Affairs Council
- World Affairs Council of Dallas/Fort Worth
- World Affairs Council of Seattle
- World Affairs Council of the Desert
- World Affairs Council of Washington, DC
- World Affairs Councils of America
- World Affairs Council (Northern California), branded as World Affairs

== See also ==
- Affairs Council (disambiguation)
- WAC (disambiguation)
- World Council (disambiguation)
