= World Council =

World Council may refer to:

== Politics and diplomacy ==
- World Business Council for Sustainable Development, an international environmental organization
- World Cultural Council, an international organization whose goals are to promote cultural values, goodwill and philanthropy among individuals
- World Food Council, a United Nations organization established by the UN General Assembly in December 1974
- World Future Council, an initiative started by Jakob von Uexkull
- World Happiness Council
- World Hereford Council
- World Peace Council, an Eastern Bloc anti-war conference
- World Water Council, an international collaboration of NGOs, governments and international organisations

== Sports ==
- World Boxing Council, an international boxing organization
- World Dance Council, a governing body of competitive dance
- World Muaythai Council
- World Motor Sport Council, the governing body of all international motorsport activities
- World Sailing Speed Record Council, the body to confirm speed records of sailing crafts on water
- World Wrestling Council, one of Puerto Rico's two main professional wrestling promotions

== Religion ==
- World Brahmo Council, a body representing the Brahmoism sect of Hinduism
- World Church Leadership Council (Community of Christ), a leadership body of the Community of Christ
- World Council of Churches, the principal international Christian ecumenical organization
- World Methodist Council, an association of churches in the Methodist tradition
- World Hindu Council, a Hindu nationalist organization based in India

== Business and trade ==
- World Council of Credit Unions, a lobbying agency for credit unions
- World Diamond Council, representatives from diamond manufacturing and trading companies
- World Gold Council, gold mining companies
- World Petroleum Council
- World Plumbing Council
- World Travel and Tourism Council, people involved in the travel and tourism industry

== See also ==
- World Affairs Council (disambiguation)
- World Buddhist Council (disambiguation)
- World Assembly
