= World Assembly =

World Assembly may refer to:

- World Assemblies of God Fellowship, an association of Pentecostal churches
- World Assembly of Muslim Youth, a youth organization from Saudi Arabia
- World Assembly of Youth, a representative body of youth organizations affiliated with the United Nations
- The World Assembly, a fictional organization from the browser game NationStates

== See also ==
- United Nations General Assembly
- World Conference (disambiguation)
- World Congress (disambiguation)
- World Council (disambiguation)
