= River Rhiw =

River in north Powys, Wales

Coordinates: 52.6046°N 3.3440°W

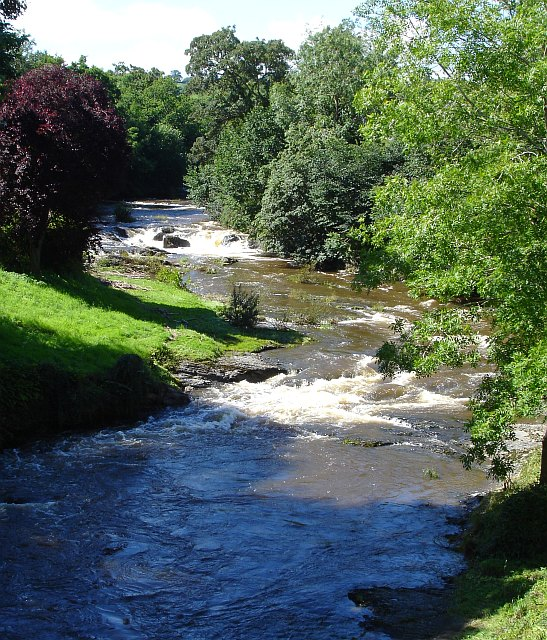
- Native name: Afon Rhiw (Welsh)

Location
- Country: Wales
- Region: Powys

Physical characteristics
- Mouth
  - location: River Severn, Berriew

The River Rhiw (Welsh: Afon Rhiw meaning 'slope river' or 'stream river') is a short river in the north of Powys in Wales. Two headwater tributaries both named Afon Rhiw flow east to join at Dwyrhiew and then continue in a generally easterly direction to join the River Severn east of Berriew (Welsh: Aberriw ‘mouth of the Rhiw’). The northern Rhiw emerges from Llyn y Bugail (Welsh: ‘lake of the shepherd’) on Mynydd Waun Fawr whilst the southern Rhiw rises near Mynydd Dwyriw. The combined river flows past the hamlets of New Mills (Welsh: Felin Newydd), Manafon and Pant-y-ffridd, accompanied by the B4390 road all the way to Berriew. Other tributaries include the Nant Wtre-wen, Crygnant, Nant y Llyn Mawr and Dolgar Brook. It is bridged and forded at numerous points, one of which is an aqueduct carrying the Montgomery Canal over it at Berriew. At the eastern end of the river is Glansevern Hall and gardens.

== Etymology ==
The Welsh word rhiw means 'slope' in which case it would be 'slope river' but it is suggested that it may be derived from a British word riu meaning stream. The modern anglicised name Berriew is derived from Aberriw ('aber' + mutated 'rhiw' signifying 'mouth of the Rhiw')
