= World Congress =

World Congress may refer to:

- Bahá'í World Congress
- Ukrainian World Congress, for Ukrainian communities in the diaspora
- World Amazigh Congress
- World Armenian Congress
- World Bosniak Congress
- World Cat Congress
- World Congress of Cardiology, for promoting research, training, and treatment of diseases of the heart
- World Congress of Families, for the traditional family
- World Congress of Intellectuals in Defense of Peace, convened in Wrocław, Poland, 1948
- World Congress of Philosophy, held every five years
- World Diamond Congress
- World Esperanto Congress
- World Harp Congress
- World Islamic Congress, convened in Jerusalem and attended by 130 delegates from 22 Muslim countries
- World Jewish Congress, founded in Geneva, Switzerland, in August 1936
- World Parkinson Congress
- World Peace Congress
- World Saxophone Congress
- World Universities Congress, hosted by Çanakkale Onsekiz Mart University between October 20–24, 2010
- World Uyghur Congress, of exiled Uyghur groups
- World Wilderness Congress
- World Youth Congress
- World Youth Congress Movement
  - 1936 World Youth Congress in Geneva
  - 1938 World Youth Congress at Vassar College, Poughkeepsie, New York.

== See also ==
- Congress, a formal meeting of representatives
- World Assembly
