= World Conference on Women =

World Conference on Women may refer to:

- First World Conference on Women, Mexico City, 1975
- Second World Conference on Women, Copenhagen, 1980
- Third World Conference on Women, Nairobi, 1985
- Fourth World Conference on Women, Beijing, 1995

== See also ==
- World Conference (disambiguation)
