= Shropshire Union Canal Society =

The Shropshire Union Canal Society is an organisation formed to promote interest in and enhance the Shropshire Union Canal system, in England and Wales.

== History ==
The Shrewsbury & Newport Canal Association was formed in December 1964, with the ambition of restoring to navigation the canals between Norbury Junction and Shrewsbury. A report had appeared in a local newspaper in September, indicating that the British Waterways Board intended to drain part of the Newport Branch of the Shrewsbury Canal, which had been closed since 1944. The Association was formed in response to a suggestion from the North-Western branch of the Inland Waterways Association that a local society was needed to campaign for restoration. In 1966 the Ministry of Transport rejected the restoration proposals, the Association changed its name to the Shropshire Union Canal Society and two years later, in 1968, set out to restore the Montgomery Canal.

Two events established the society in its aims to restore the Montgomery Canal. The first was a breach of the River Tanet weir, which supplies water to the canal at Carreghofa locks. This would have removed the main water supply for much of the canal, and led to the society beginning their campaign for the restoration and reopening of the canal. The weir was repaired in the summer of 1970, at a cost of £12,000.

The second event was triggered by a proposal to build a bypass along the route of the canal through Welshpool. The suggestion was opposed by the Welshpool By-Pass Action Committee, who invited the Shropshire Union Canal Society to organise the restoration of some of the affected route in 1969. This became known as the "Welshpool Dig", and was a great success. Some 200 volunteers from all over Britain turned up to take part, and around 1.5 miles (2.4 km) of canal through the town were cleared over one weekend.

A major breakthrough in the restoration of the canal occurred when Prince Charles (now King Charles III) established the Prince of Wales Committee, to fund projects in Wales. One of these projects was restoration of 7 miles (11 km) of canal from Pool Quay to Gallowstree Bank Bridge, which was agreed on 25 October 1973. The Variety Club of Great Britain provided most of the £300,000 cost of the work, but the society collaborated with British Waterways staff on the renovation of the locks on the Pool Quay flight. The length was opened by Prince Charles on 23 May 1976, when he steered a boat named Heulwen/Sunshire, designed to carry children needing specialist care.

The society was responsible for the restoration of the two locks at Carreghofa and the adjacent toll house. The house was located next to the junction between the Ellesmere Canal and the Montgomeryshire Canal Eastern Branch, when sections of what is now the Montgomery Canal were owned by separate companies. The society funded the restoration, and carried out the work. Once it was complete, an official opening of the locks was held on 1 November 1986, when Lady White officiated.

They were also responsible for the restoration of Burgedin Locks, raising the finance to pay for the work. Because the canal pound between the top and bottom locks was prone to leakage, the project included the excavation and construction of a concrete channel to resolve the issue. When work was completed, an official opening was held on 6 June 1998. The chief executive of British Waterways, Dr Dave Flethcer CBE, and the chairman of the Shropshire Union Canal Society, Bob Johnstone, travelled through the locks on the narrowboat Linnet and cut a ribbon to mark the occasion.

The society were awarded the Tetlow Cup on 21 June 2023. It is presented annually by the Inland Waterways Association, in recognition of outstanding service to the cause of waterway restoration. The society had taken eight years to restore a 690-yard (630 m) section of canal from Pryces Bridge to Crickheath. The task was particularly difficult because the canal crossed a peat bog, and in places all traces of the banks had disappeared into the bog. Progress had been affected by the need to relocate great crested newts and the COVID-19 lockdowns. The work had required high levels of skill, and had redefined the types of work which can be completed by volunteers.

== See also ==
- Canals of the United Kingdom
- History of the British canal system
- Shrewsbury & Newport Canals Trust

== Bibliography ==
- Arnold, Harry (2003). The Montgomery Canal and its Restoration. Tempus Publishing. ISBN 978-0-7524-1660-1.
- Cumberlidge, Jane (2009). Inland Waterways of Great Britain (8th Ed.). Imray Laurie Norie and Wilson. ISBN 978-1-84623-010-3.
- Squires, Roger (2008). Britain's restored canals. Landmark Publishing. ISBN 978-1-84306-331-5.
