= World Canals Conference =

The World Canals Conference (WCC) is an annual conference about canals and other waterways worldwide. The first conference took place in 1988, and the 2019 conference was the thirty-second. People with an interest in canals gather together to learn more about them, to exchange views, and to enjoy and celebrate successful canal restoration projects.

The organisation has undergone some name changes. The conference in 1988 was known as the "First National Conference on Historic Canals". In 1990, the "national" gave way to the "International Conference on Historic Canals", and in 1996 it became the World Canals Conference.

== Attendees ==
The conferences are attended by large numbers of canal professionals, tourism experts and academics, as well as many canal enthusiasts and boaters, from all over the world. Their particular concerns and interests include:

- preservation
- restoration
- urban and rural economic regeneration
- sustainable development
- ways of attracting tourists
- education and interpretation
- involvement of volunteers and the community

The Conference programme duly addresses these interests by providing a varied lecture programme and relevant excursions to local canal projects.

The prospectus of the 2007 Conference in Liverpool (see external link below) offers not only lectures, including on the Anderton Boat Lift, the Tate Liverpool canal warehouse conversion to a museum, the Liverpool Canal Link and the Roubaix Canal, but also local excursions and site visits, e.g. Manchester's Castlefield canals, Stalybridge on the Huddersfield Narrow Canal, and the Barton Swing Aqueduct on the Manchester Ship Canal.

Further afield, there were trips to the Pontcysyllte Aqueduct, the Chirk Aqueduct, the Llangollen Canal and the Montgomery Canal restoration project.

== Year, location and theme ==
- 1988 Illinois & Michigan Canal
- 1989 Delaware Canal
- 1990 Rideau Canal, National Historic Site of Canada
- 1991 Ohio & Erie Canal, a National Heritage Corridor in the US
- 1992 Chesapeake & Ohio Canal, a National Historic Park in the US
- 1993 Shubenacadie Canal, Dartmouth, Nova Scotia, Canada
- 1994 Trent-Severn Waterway, Peterborough, Ontario, Canada
- 1995 Augusta Canal, a National Heritage Area
- 1996 Birmingham, England, United Kingdom
- 1997 Blackstone River Valley, a National Heritage Corridor in the US
- 1998 Illinois & Michigan Canal
- 1999 Lille, France and La Louvière, Belgium
- 2000 New York State Canal System, Rochester, NY
- 2001 Dublin, Republic of Ireland, and Belfast, Northern Ireland, United Kingdom
- 2002 Montreal, Quebec, Canada
- 2003 Scottish canals, Scotland, United Kingdom
- 2004 Welland Canal, St Catharines, Ontario, Canada
- 2005 Sweden Theme: "Six Canals in Six Days"
- 2006 Bethlehem, Pennsylvania, US Theme: "Industry to recreation: Greening the Coal Canals"
- 2007 Liverpool, England, United Kingdom
- 2008 Rideau Canal, Kingston, Ontario, Canada - Theme: "Managing Canal Corridors in the 21st Century"
- 2009 Novi Sad, Serbia
- 2010 Rochester, New York
- 2011 Groningen, the Netherlands
- 2012 Granal Canal, China
- 2013 Canal du Midi, Toulouse, France
- 2014 Milan, Italy
- 2015 Ghent, Belgium
- 2016 Inverness, Scotland
- 2017 Syracuse, NY, USA
- 2018 Athlone, Ireland
- 2019 Yangzhou, Jiangsu, China
- 2020 cancelled
- 2021 Hagerstown, Maryland, USA
- 2022 Leipzig, Germany
- 2023 online
- 2024 Bydgoszcz, Poland
- 2025 Buffalo, NY, USA
- 2026 Guilin, Guangxi, China
