= Public Affairs Council (disambiguation) =

The Public Affairs Council is an association for public affairs professionals in the United States.

Public Affairs Council may also refer to:

In Islam:

- Muslim American Public Affairs Council, an American-Muslim political and public advocacy group headquartered in Raleigh, North Carolina
- Muslim Public Affairs Council, an American Muslim advocacy organization headquartered in Los Angeles

In other fields:

- Jewish Council for Public Affairs, a Jewish organization
- Oklahoma Council of Public Affairs, a politically conservative think tank in Oklahoma
