= Burgedin =

Coordinates: 52.71°N 03.12°W

- Location within Powys
- OS grid reference: SJ2414
- Principal area: Powys
- Country: Wales
- Sovereign state: United Kingdom
- Police: Dyfed-Powys
- Fire: Mid and West Wales
- Ambulance: Welsh

Burgedin is a village in Powys, Wales. The Montgomery Canal passes near the village.

It was once a township in the parish of Guilsfield. In the 1870s it had a population of 491.
