= Montgomery Canal =

Canal in Shropshire, England, and Powys, Wales

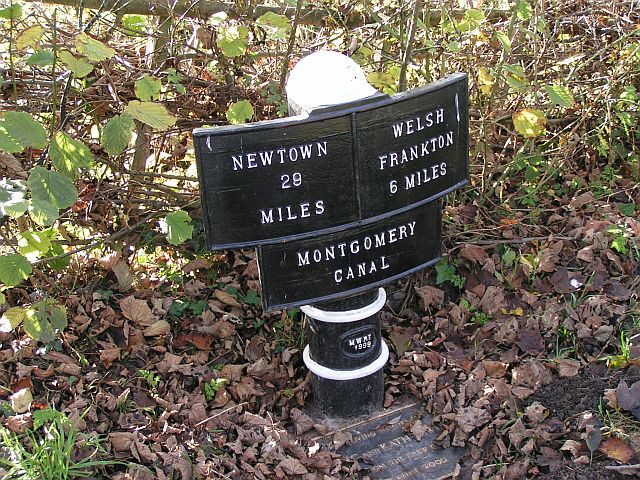
- Montgomery Canal milepost
- Interactive map of Montgomery Canal

Specifications
- Maximum boat length: 70 ft 0 in (21.34 m)
- Maximum boat beam: 6 ft 10 in (2.08 m)
- Locks: 27 (originally 26) (Graham Palmer lock was added during restoration)
- Maximum height AMSL: 265 ft (81 m)
- Status: Parts navigable; parts under restoration
- Navigation authority: Canal and River Trust

History
- Former names: Montgomeryshire Canal; Llanymynech Branch of the Ellesmere Canal; Montgomery Branch (or Arm) of the Shropshire Union
- Modern name: Montgomery Canal
- Original owner: The Company of Proprietors of the Montgomeryshire Canal
- Principal engineer: John Dadford
- Other engineer: Thomas Dadford Junior/Thomas Dadford senior/Josias Jessop/John Williams/George W.Buck
- Date of act: 1794
- Date completed: 1821
- Date closed: 1936 (legal abandonment: 1944)
- Date restored: 1987 — (On-going restoration)

Geography
- Branch: Weston Branch (dis.)
- Branch of: Llangollen Canal

The Montgomery Canal (Welsh: Camlas Trefaldwyn), known colloquially as "The Monty", is a partially restored canal in eastern Powys and northwest Shropshire. The canal runs 33 miles (53 km) from the Llangollen Canal at Frankton Junction to Newtown via Llanymynech and Welshpool and crosses the England–Wales border.

The canal was formally named as the Montgomery Canal in the British Waterways Act 1987. However, it was informally known by this name prior to this act. It consists of the Eastern and Western branches of the Montgomeryshire Canal and the Llanymynech Branch of the Ellesmere Canal. The Montgomeryshire Canal ran from Llanymynech to Newtown. It was named after the county of Montgomeryshire that it ran through and was divided into Western and Eastern branches which met at Garthmyl. At Carreghofa Locks near Llanymynech, the Montgomeryshire Canal connected to the Llanymynech Branch of the Ellesmere Canal. The Llanymynech Branch ran from Carreghofa Locks to Frankton Junction where it meets the present-day Llangollen Canal.

The Montgomery Canal does not, and never did, go to the town of Montgomery. The three constituents of the present-day Montgomery Canal became part of the Shropshire Union Canal system: the Ellesmere Canal including the Llanymynech Branch in 1846, the Eastern Branch in 1847 and the Western Branch in 1850.

The canal fell into disuse following a breach in 1936 and was officially abandoned in 1944. At present, only 8 miles (13 km) from Frankton Junction to Crickheath Bridge is navigable and connected to the rest of the national Canal & River Trust network. Separately, a 0.5-mile (0.8 km) section at Llanymynech and a 12-mile (19 km) section of the canal around Welshpool are navigable though isolated from the national canal network. Ongoing restoration work continues to connect the navigable sections.

== History ==
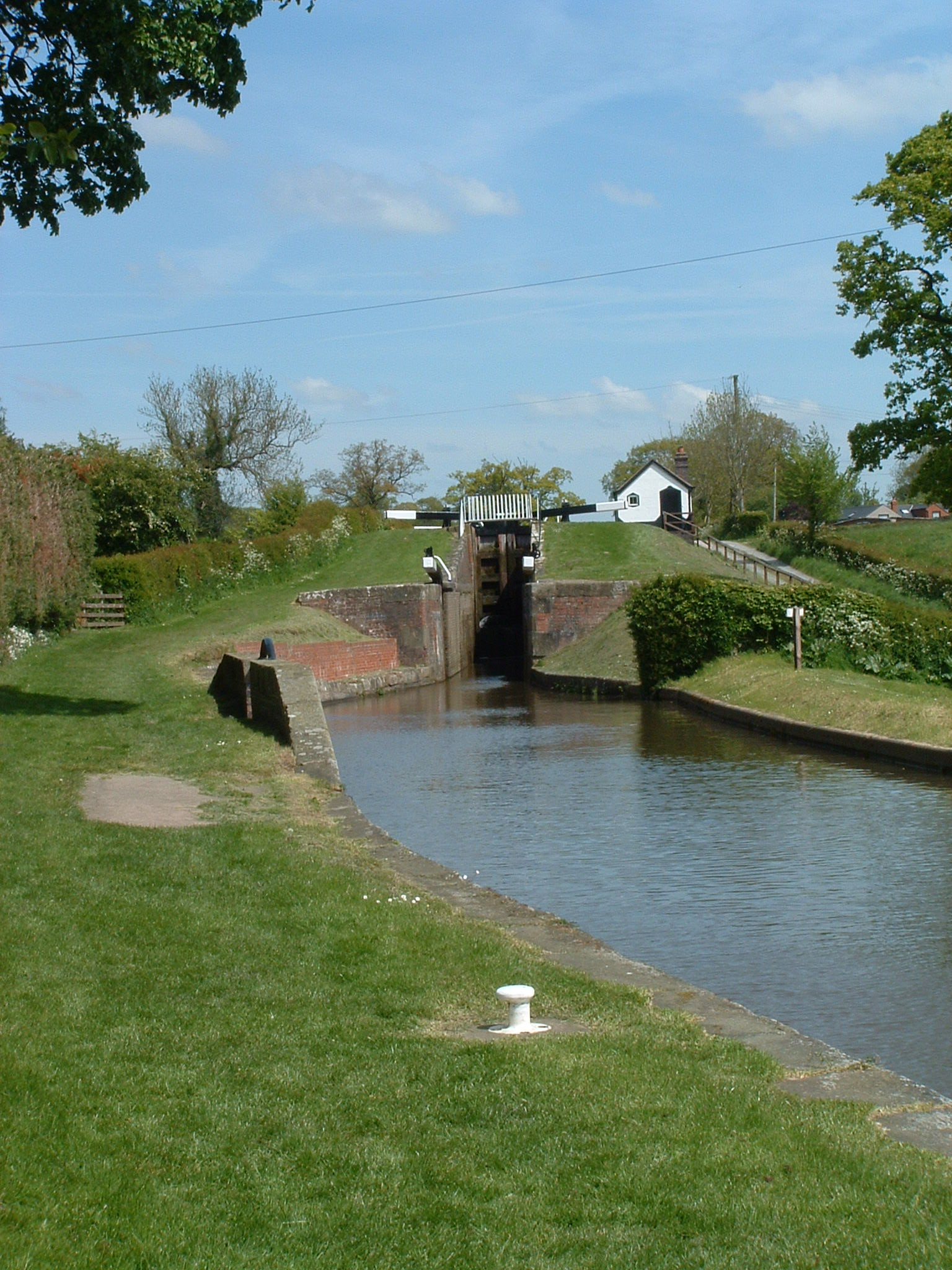
Frankton Staircase Lock

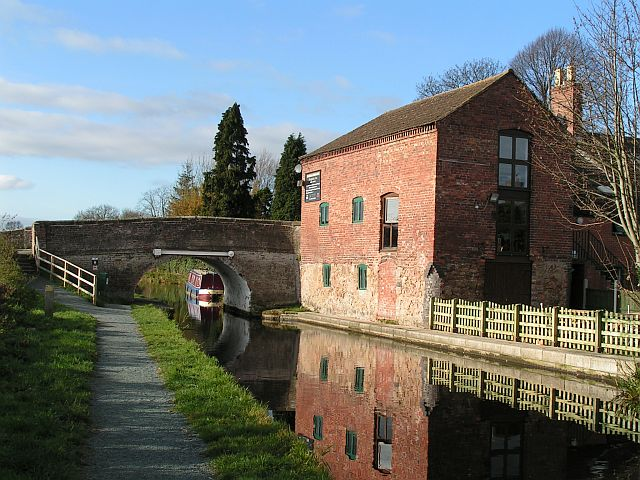
Maesbury Marsh

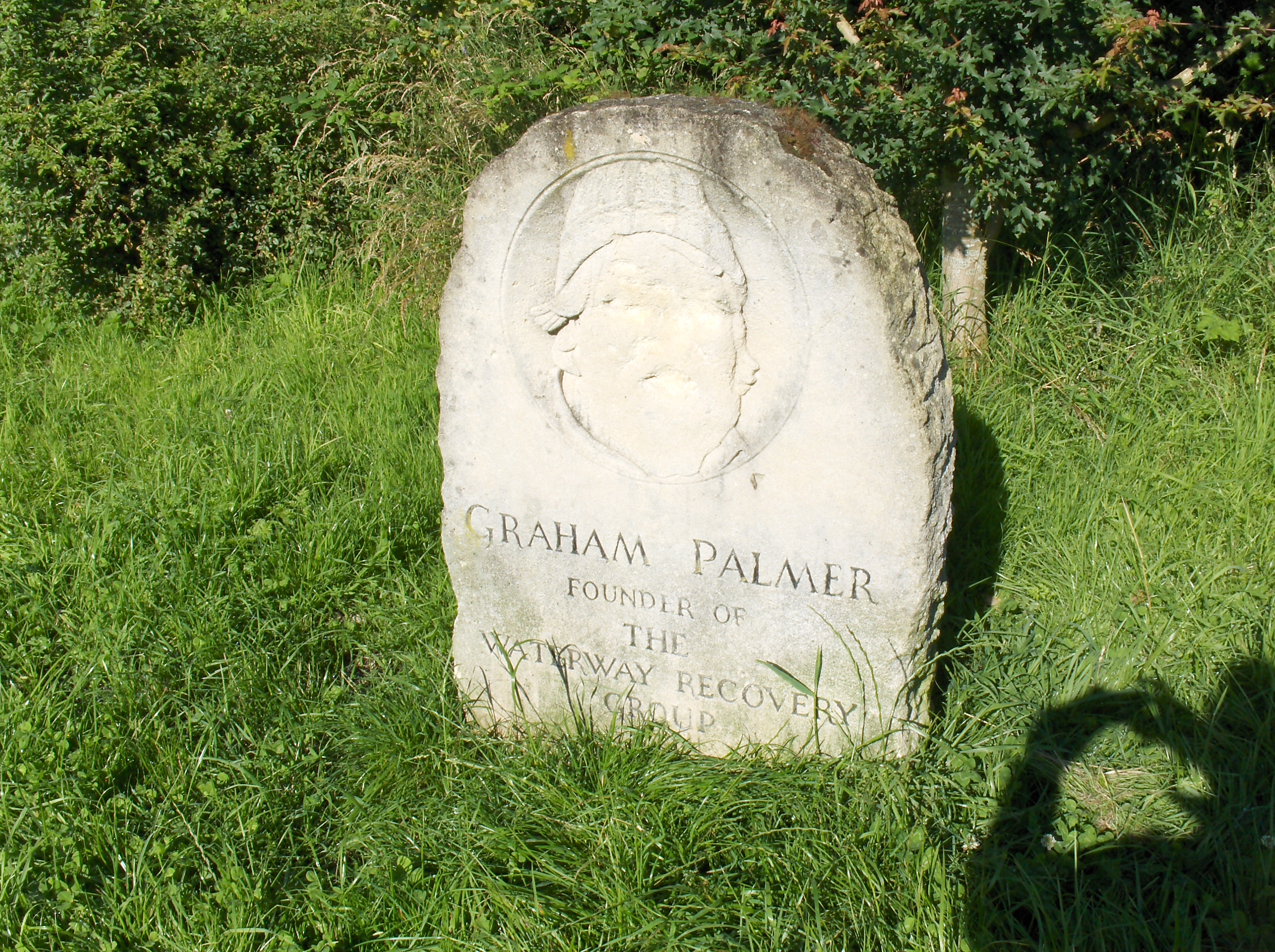
Memorial stone to Graham Palmer, founder of the Waterway Recovery Group, located adjacent to Graham Palmer Lock on the Montgomery Canal

The Montgomeryshire Canal was devised with a different purpose from most other canals of the time. Whereas other canals could generate sufficient revenue from cargo carrying to be financially viable, the Montgomeryshire was planned to serve a more rural area which would not offer such opportunities. Instead, the primary purpose of the canal was to transport lime for agricultural purposes which would allow the Upper Severn Valley to become better agricultural land. As a result, the promoters of the canal included local landowners who hoped to achieve a return on their investment through greater crop yields rather than relying upon share dividends.

Montgomeryshire Canal Act 1794
- Act of Parliament
- Parliament of Great Britain
- Long title: An act for making a navigable Canal from or near Porthywain Lime Rocks in the parish of Llanyblodwell, in the county of Salop, to or near Newtown, in the county of Montgomery, and also certain collateral Cuts from the said Canal.
- Citation: 34 Geo. 3. c. 39
- Territorial extent: Great Britain

Dates
- Royal assent: 28 March 1794
- Commencement: 28 March 1794 (Note: The Acts of Parliament (Commencement) Act 1793.)
Other legislation
Amended by	Montgomeryshire Canal Act 1815

Status: Amended

Text of statute as originally enacted

The original 1792 proposal for the Montgomeryshire Canal was for a route from Llanymynech, where it would join the proposed Llanymynech Branch of the Ellesmere Canal, to Welshpool. By 1793, it had been decided that the canal should continue through to Newtown. The canal was authorised in 1794 by an act of Parliament, the Montgomeryshire Canal Act 1794 (34 Geo. 3. c. 39), entitled "An act for making a navigable Canal from or near Porthywain Lime Rocks in the parish of Llanyblodwell, in the county of Salop, to or near Newtown, in the county of Montgomery, and also certain collateral Cuts from the said Canal." The company was authorised to raise £72,000 from shares and a further £20,000 if required. John Dadford was appointed Engineer while his brother Thomas Dadford Junior was appointed his assistant. There had been suggestions in 1793 for a connecting canal between Garthmyl and the Leominster Canal at Woofferton. It would have been 40.25 miles (65 km) long but the plan came to nothing.

By February 1796, parts of the canal were completed and the first boat, named the Royal Montgomery, was launched into the canal near Welshpool amidst great celebrations. In July 1797, the connection to the Ellesmere Canal at Llanymynech was opened although the Llanymynech branch was still suffering from problems with leakage. A month later, the canal had reached Garthmyl providing 16 miles (26 km) of navigable canal from Llanymynech but stopping 7 miles (11 km) short of Newtown. In early 1797 John Dadford had resigned his post in order to pursue a career in America and, at the suggestion of Thomas Dadford, had been replaced by his father Thomas Dadford senior. During construction, there had been problems with both the Berriew Aqueduct and the Vyrnwy Aqueduct where one arch had collapsed. The management committee were unhappy with this and the engineer William Jessop was called in to advise but he explained that such issues were merely teething problems and allayed their fears. To reach Garthmyl, £71,000 had been spent. The canal thus far included 13 locks: four descending between Carraghofa and Burgedin and nine rising from there to Garthmyl. It included a level branch to Guilsfield, some 2.25 miles (3.6 km) long.

Although conceived as a means to serve agricultural communities, trade on the canal developed steadily. There were a number of quarries in the Llanymynech area which delivered limestone to the canal for transport to kilns at Belan and elsewhere. Grain prices rose from 1800 onwards and there was a large demand for lime as a fertiliser so that the Welsh hill-lands could be enclosed and developed for agriculture. Once the Chirk and Pontcysyllte aqueducts were opened on the Ellesmere branch to Llangollen, there was an easy route for the transport of coal used in the lime kilns to produce fertiliser. Other cargoes included stone for building, roofing slates, timber and bark. At its outset, the Earl of Powis had been one of the principal shareholders in the canal; he and his son, Lord Clive, were both landowners and owners of quarries and mills along the canal. The first dividend of 2.5 per cent was paid in 1805 and thereafter, a dividend was paid in most years while the canal remained independent at rates up to 5.5 per cent. Volumes of limestone carried rose from 14,082 tons in 1806 to 44,592 tons in 1814 while carriage of slack coal rose from 6,757 tons to 11,560 tons over the same period. There was a significant drop in volumes with the end of the Napoleonic Wars but trade had picked up again by 1820.

=== Western extension ===
A lack of capital and income prevented completion of the canal and Garthmyl remained the terminus for 20 years but by 1812, Newtown was experiencing significant growth and there were calls to extend the route southwards, either as a canal from Garthmyl to Newtown or as a canal to Bryn-derwen and a tramroad beyond that. A meeting of the shareholders held in October 1813 narrowly voted to press on and Josias Jessop was asked to survey the route. His initial estimate was £28,268 although some of the committee later thought that he had forgotten to include the cost of puddling and lining the canal. The company agreed to put a Bill before Parliament to obtain the necessary powers but factions developed within the shareholders with some fearing that they might lose their investment if the canal were completed. Heated meetings were held in September 1814 and January 1815 at which neither side was entirely successful but on 3 February 1815, the company agreed that the new section would effectively be built by a separate company with its own committee and accounts.

Montgomeryshire Canal Act 1815
- Act of Parliament
- Parliament of the United Kingdom
- Long title: An Act to authorize the raising of a further Sum of Money to complete the Montgomeryshire Canal, and to extend the Power of deviating from, and making certain Alterations in Part of the original Plan, and for explaining and rendering more effectual an Act of the Thirty fourth Year of His present Majesty for making the said Canal.
- Citation: 55 Geo. 3. c. lxxxiii
- Territorial extent: United Kingdom

Dates
- Royal assent: 22 June 1815
- Commencement: 22 June 1815
Other legislation
Amends	Montgomeryshire Canal Act 1794
Amended by	Montgomeryshire Canal Act 1821; Shropshire Union Railways and Canal (Newton to Crewe with Branches) Act 1846

Status: Amended

Text of statute as originally enacted

The old company would be known as the Eastern Branch with the new company responsible for the Western Branch. Any profits that the Eastern Branch made above 5 per cent would be used to fund the extension and on completion, the two branches would be jointly managed. Surpluses from the Eastern Branch would continue to be transferred to the Western Branch until it was able to pay a 5 per cent dividend at which point the two companies would be formally amalgamated. This was enshrined in the Montgomeryshire Canal Act 1815 (55 Geo. 3. c. lxxxiii) which authorised the raising of £40,000 in new shares to complete the canal. The new company kept themselves separate failing to notify the Eastern Branch how the work was progressing. Under the supervision of John Williams, the resident engineer, who used Jessop's plans, the new canal was completed in March 1819 although it was not formally declared to be complete until 7 December 1821. It descended through six locks from Newtown and was supplied with water from the River Severn by a 24-foot (7.3 m) water wheel and a backup steam engine. An additional supply came from a weir and feeder at Penarth.

Montgomeryshire Canal Act 1821
- Act of Parliament
- Parliament of the United Kingdom
- Long title: An Act to enable the Company of Proprietors of the Eastern Branch of the Montgomeryshire Canal, to alter the Line of the Tannat Feeder, to make a Navigable Cut from the Guilsfield Branch to the same; and to amend Two several Acts respecting the said Canal.
- Citation: 1 & 2 Geo. 4. c. cxix
- Territorial extent: United Kingdom

Dates
- Royal assent: 23 June 1821
- Commencement: 23 June 1821
Other legislation
Amended by	Shropshire Union Railways and Canal (Newton to Crewe with Branches) Act 1846

Status: Amended

The six locks were each 8 feet (2.4 m) deep with the cut being 4 feet 6 inches (1.37 m) deep and 15 feet (4.6 m) wide at the bottom. As a result of the Western Branch needing to be profitable to allow the branches to merge, a higher tonnage charge was imposed on the Western Branch. On 23 June 1821 a further act of Parliament, the Montgomeryshire Canal Act 1821 (1 & 2 Geo. 4. c. cxix), was obtained to alter the line of the Tanat feeder and to make a navigable cut from the Guilsfield Branch. This act stipulated that the consolidation of the Eastern and Western branches would no longer be automatic but would require the consent of the proprietors of each and clarified that the commencement of the Eastern branch was to be taken as the distance of thirty-five yards from the sill of the upper gate of the higher of the two Carreghofa locks. This alteration to the line of the Tanat feeder resulted in it now supplying the pound above the Carreghofa locks whereas it had previously fed only the Eastern Branch as it entered the canal between the locks.

The cost of the Western Branch was £53,390 which was well in excess of the £22,300 which had been raised by issuing new shares. The company had borrowed £6,000 from the Exchequer Bill Loan Commissioners and the rest from various others, the majority coming from William Pugh. Income on the new branch was meagre so that the company could not meet the interest payments on the loans and factions developed. One group was led by Pugh who complained that the engineer Williams had muddled the accounts since the canal had opened and another group thought that Pugh had borrowed money beyond the powers granted by the act of Parliament. They wanted the Exchequer Bill Loan Commissioners to investigate the company's financial position. However both parties agreed that George Buck, who had been the engineer for the Eastern Branch since 1819, should become engineer and clerk and he was appointed to this post in December 1832 with a mandate to investigate the accounts.

Montgomeryshire Canal Company Act 1834
- Act of Parliament
- Parliament of the United Kingdom
- Long title: An Act for enabling the Company of Proprietors of the Western Branch of the Montgomeryshire Canal to effect an Agreement with William Pugh of Bryn Llywarch in the County of Montgomery, Esquire; and for securing certain Monies advanced and paid by the said William Pugh and others to or for the Use of the said Company.
- Citation: 4 & 5 Will. 4. c. xviii
- Territorial extent: United Kingdom

Dates
- Royal assent: 22 May 1834
- Commencement: 22 May 1834

Status: Current legislation

Text of statute as originally enacted

Buck presented his findings in November 1833 but the meeting took no action as Pugh was absent. Buck moved on the following month to assist Robert Stephenson on railway projects. Pugh then paid off both the capital and interest of most of the other creditors resulting in the company owing him £38,106 which was split into a mortgage for £25,000 and £13,000 in shares. He then obtained his own act of Parliament, the Montgomeryshire Canal Company Act 1834 (4 & 5 Will. 4. c. xviii) to authorise his position and to allow the company to raise their tolls. By June 1835, the Western Branch declared that receipts were sufficient to pay the interest on all mortgages but there is no evidence that any dividends were ever paid on the shares. The two branches remained separate companies throughout their life.

=== Shropshire Union takeover ===
Major structural repairs to the Vyrnwy aqueduct had been required in 1823 when all of the arches were strengthened by iron bands under the supervision of Buck. Otherwise, the Eastern Branch continued to be relatively prosperous apart from a brief dip during a trade recession between 1840 and 1844. This was partly due to the late arrival of railways in the area. The Western Branch, in contrast, was hampered by the fact that nearly all of the traffic was in one direction towards Newtown with very little goods travelling in the opposite direction.

The prospect of railway competition arrived in the 1840s and in 1845 the company was approached by the proposed Shrewsbury to Newtown Railway to work out a deal. The company responded by setting up a subcommittee in January 1845 to consider how best to protect themselves from such competition. Meanwhile, the London and Birmingham Railway were negotiating with the Ellesmere and Chester Canal who were planning to convert some of their canals into railways. They asked William Cubitt to investigate whether their own canal could be converted but that plan was dropped soon afterwards as the Ellesmere and Chester offered to buy the canal for £110 per share and the offer was accepted. The Ellesmere and Chester Canal obtained an act of Parliament to enable them to become the Shropshire Union Railways and Canal Company and to take over several canals including both the Eastern and Western Branches of the Montgomeryshire Canal. The Eastern Branch was formally transferred to become part of the Shropshire Union on 1 January 1847 with the company receiving £78,210 of which £7,920 was in shares in the new company and the rest was in cash. The Western Branch remained under Pugh's control for three more years but was bought for £42,000 on 5 February 1850 although some £7,000 of this cannot be traced from the accounts.

The Shropshire Union company had negotiated with several railway companies who had initially been rivals but on 1 January 1846, they had all amalgamated to become the London and North Western Railway (LNWR). The Shropshire Union had obtained powers in their enabling act to build railways and thus became a threat to the London and North Western Railway who offered to lease the Shropshire Union in the autumn of 1846. This was formalised by the Shropshire Union Railways and Canal Lease Act 1847 (10 & 11 Vict. c. cxxi) in July 1847 although the powers were not fully implemented until 25 March 1857. Part of the deal was that the Shropshire Union would drop its aspirations to build railways but in return, would have a free hand to run the canals which they did vigorously. The LNWR applied for powers to build a railway linking Shrewsbury, Newtown, Welshpool and Oswestry in 1853 but after negotiation with the Great Western Railway, withdrew the bill and it was they who built the Oswestry and Newtown Railway which was completed on 10 June 1861. The plan was supported by some of the former Montgomeryshire Canal shareholders, who were disappointed that the sale of the canal to the Shropshire Union had not resulted in it being converted into a railway.

=== Decline ===
Although the Shropshire Union had a fairly free hand in running the canals, the goods that could be carried were restricted by the terms of their lease and the canals gradually became less profitable. Consideration was given to closing the Weston Arm in 1875 and again in 1885 but no action was taken. The idea of closing the whole of the former Montgomeryshire Canal was considered in 1887 but study of the figures revealed that it was still making a small profit of £432 per year and so it was reprieved. In May 1917, the Weston Arm suffered a breach at Dandyfield which it was estimated would cost £14,000 to repair. Thereafter, the arm was only open for about 0.75 miles (1.21 km) to Hordley wharf but there were complaints and the issue was referred to the Board of Trade. They ruled in 1920 that repairs were not justified and so the arm stayed closed. The Shropshire Union was absorbed by the London and North Western Railway in late 1922 and itself became part of the London, Midland and Scottish Railway (LMS) under the 1923 grouping of the railways. Another breach of the canal occurred a mile (1.6 km) from Frankton Junction on 5 February 1936. The owners paid compensation to George Beck, the main user of the canal, and applied for a warrant of abandonment but this was refused. The LMS finally obtained an act of abandonment, the London Midland and Scottish Railway (Canals) Act 1944 (8 & 9 Geo. 6. c. ii), which gave them powers to close the whole of the canal from Frankton Junction southwards, including the Weston Arm, as part of a plan to close 175 miles (282 km) of canal.

The act of abandonment allowed bridges to be lowered although none of the route of the canal was sold at that time. The Transport Act 1947 (10 & 11 Geo. 6. c. 49) resulted in the nationalisation of the railways and canals with control of the Montgomeryshire Canal passing to the British Transport Commission in 1948 and ultimately to British Waterways in 1963 following the passing of the Transport Act 1962 (10 & 11 Eliz. 2. c. 46). The Transport Act 1968 classified canals into one of three categories and the Montgomeryshire Canal became a Remainder Waterway meaning that British Waterways could only carry out certain statutory work on it. As a result of the act, the final 2 miles (3.2 km) to Newtown were sold off.

== Restoration ==
Since 1969, when the canal through Welshpool was threatened by a proposed road bypass, the canal has been gradually – but so far only partially – restored for use by pleasure boaters. In some places, the canal has been filled in, roads have been built over the channel, bridges have been lowered and infrastructure such as pipes and manhole covers have been built in the canal bed presenting several obstacles to restoration. The end section from Freestone Lock to Newtown is dry and no longer in Canal & River Trust ownership.

=== Early progress ===
In 1969, there were plans to convert the bed of the canal through Welshpool into a road and the Welshpool By-Pass Action Committee was formed to oppose this. They requested the help of the recently formed Shropshire Union Canal Society who organised a "Big Dig" at Welshpool to clear a section of the canal. The Shropshire Union Canal Society had already begun campaigning for the restoration of the canal and in the run-up to the event, members attended council meetings, mounted displays in the town and organised a visit to Market Drayton for Welshpool Town Council, to see another section of the Shropshire Union where progress was being made. Key players included Graham Palmer, the organiser of the London and Home Counties Working Party Group of the Inland Waterways Association. They published a journal called Navvies Notebook which co-ordinated volunteer activity on the canals across Britain and within a year had become the Waterway Recovery Group. It was agreed that volunteers would tackle the section from Welshpool Lock northwards to Mill Lane. Despite high-level opposition to restoration by British Waterways, at local level they agreed to shut off the feed to the southern section and lower the water level so that water could be pumped out of the section through Welshpool, rather than discharged into the Lledan Brook.

Welshpool Borough Council refused the use of their tip for material removed from the canal but a local farmer called W Davies offered the use of his land. Buttington Contractors offered items of equipment and the event was planned for the weekend of 18 and 19 October 1969. Some 100 volunteers were expected and pumping began on Friday evening. The Severn River Board removed over 700 fish on Saturday morning and numbers attending exceeded expectations. Despite warnings by British Waterways not to touch it, the Lledan Brook flood paddle was opened to assist in the drainage of the canal and over 200 people set to work using hand tools and borrowed equipment including a mobile crane, ten dumper trucks, four 7-ton tipper trucks, three JCB diggers and a Hy-Mac long arm excavator. Brian Haskins, the British Waterways area engineer from Northwich, visited the site and overlooked the use of the flood paddle. There was considerable interest from the townspeople and the number of onlookers became a bit of a hazard. The cleared canal was refilled on the Sunday and the Mayor and Mayoress rode along the section on a cruiser that had been trailed from Market Drayton. The canal route for the bypass was subsequently rejected by a public enquiry.

The Inland Waterways Amenity Advisory Council published a review on 20 August 1971 which assessed the potential of the "Remainder Waterways" which had been defined in the Transport Act 1968. This advocated the complete restoration of the Montgomery Canal among other suggestions. The Prince of Wales announced a plan to restore 7 miles (11 km) of the canal to amenity waterway standards in October 1973. This was achieved through the Prince of Wales Committee of the House of Lords and was to be managed by the Shropshire Union Canal Society. The scheme was backed by the Variety Club of Great Britain who wanted to use the restored canal as a recreational base for the benefit of handicapped children. The Prince formally opened Welshpool Town Lock on 23 May 1974 as the scheme got under way. Despite the progress being made, the Welsh Office approved a scheme in 1976 to construct a bypass road at Arddleen which would have crossed the canal at low level and culverted the canal beneath it. The Inland Waterways Association and the Shropshire Union Canal Society worked together to get the scheme changed and by mid-1978, an engineering solution had been worked out but the costs involved brought delays to the restoration.

The next threat to restoration occurred in 1979 when following the collapse of James Callaghan's Labour government and the election of Margaret Thatcher, economic conditions were tight. Powys County Council were faced with the cost of repairing and upgrading bridges over the canal and wanted to lower bridge 96, below Carreghofa bottom lock, to remove a weight restriction. They applied to the High Court for a "writ mandamus" which put the onus on the court to decide who was responsible for the costs. Again, the restoration movement objected but the court ruled in favour of lowering the bridge. British Waterways objected on the basis that restoration was already ongoing. Soon afterwards, the Secretary of State suggested that a note should be added to the Shropshire County structure plan indicating that the line of the canal should be protected but the lowering of the bridge went ahead. The Powys structure plan was amended in early 1982 to protect the canal from bridge 120, located to the south of Welshpool, northwards. However within weeks, British Waterways announced that the future restoration beyond the locks at Frankton and Carreghofa, was uncertain. The Restoration Trust met with Sir Frank Price, chairman of British Waterways, on 5 April 1982 and it was agreed that an economic assessment of the viability of restoration should be carried out and completed by October.

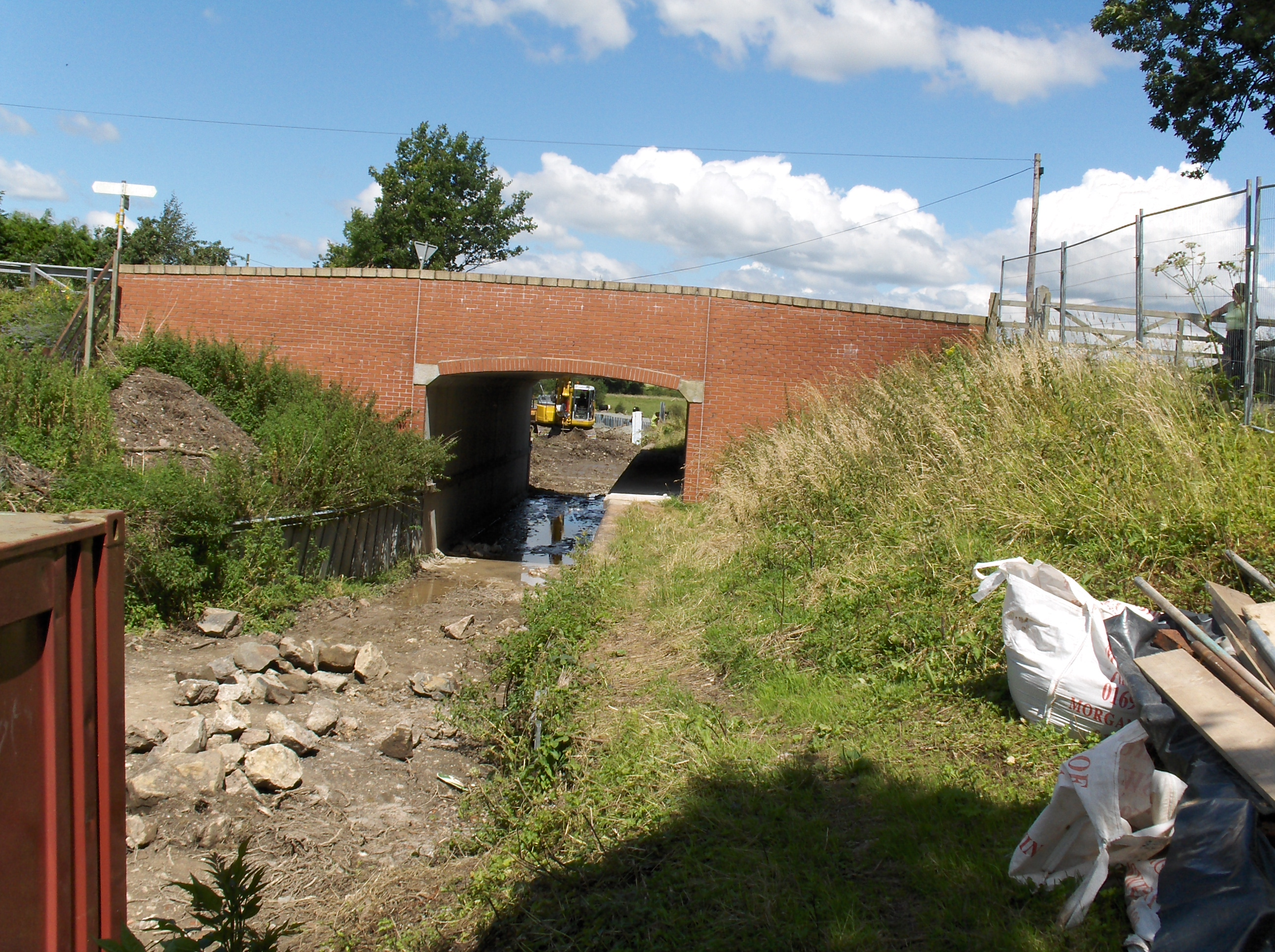
Restoration near Redwith Bridge, July 2007

By 1985, the environmental lobby was growing and in order to avert a situation where boaters and environmentalists clashed, the Manpower Services Commission funded a scheme to document the flora and fauna of the unrestored canal. It included an experimental off-line nature reserve which could provide a habitat for rare or interesting plants and the first such reserve was built at Rednal. The concept was a success and paved the way for other reserves that allowed restoration to proceed, both on the Montgomery Canal and on other canals where there were sensitive environmental concerns. Montgomeryshire County Council committed £1 million to canal restoration over a five-year period as British Waterways submitted a private bill to Parliament to authorise restoration of the whole canal. The restoration benefited from a legacy of £200,000 left by Humphrey Symonds via the Inland Waterways Association, specifically for the Montgomery Canal. Frankton Locks were reopened on 12 September 1987 by the Prince of Wales, who announced that volunteers had worked for 12,000 man-hours on the project and that the value of this contribution was £200,000.

British Waterways Act 1987 (Note: Section 1(1).)
- Act of Parliament
- Parliament of the United Kingdom
- Long title: An Act to empower the British Waterways Board to construct works and to acquire lands for the restoration of the canal from Newtown to Frankton Junction; to make further provision with respect to such restoration; and for other purposes.
- Citation: 1987 c. xxviii
- Territorial extent: United Kingdom

Dates
- Royal assent: 17 December 1987
- Commencement: 17 December 1987

Status: Current legislation

Text of statute as originally enacted

British Waterways Act 1988
- Act of Parliament
- Parliament of the United Kingdom
- Long title: An Act to authorise the British Waterways Board to permit the use for navigation of certain canals which have been closed to navigation by the London Midland and Scottish Railway (Canals) Act 1944; and for connected purposes.
- Citation: 1988 c. xxv
- Territorial extent: United Kingdom

Dates
- Royal assent: 29 July 1988
- Commencement: 29 July 1988
Other legislation
Relates to	London Midland and Scottish Railway (Canals) Act 1944

Status: Current legislation

Text of statute as originally enacted

The British Waterways Act 1987 (c. xxviii) became law on 17 December 1987, and authorised the restoration of the canal from Newtown Pumping Station to Frankton Junction, including the Guilsfield and Weston arms. It formalised the change of name to the Montgomery Canal and the construction and maintenance of nature reserves. It specified that any refurbished or new sections of the canal, when they were brought into use, would automatically be designated as Remainder Waterways using the classification from the Transport Act 1968. A second act, the British Waterways Act 1988 (c. xxv), was obtained on 29 July 1988 to undo the provisions of the London Midland and Scottish Railway (Canals) Act 1944 which had removed the right of navigation and prohibited such use. The new act reinstated the right of navigation on any sections open at the time the act was obtained and on any sections subsequently re-opened. British Waterways was succeeded by the Canal & River Trust in 2012.

=== Bridging the gap ===
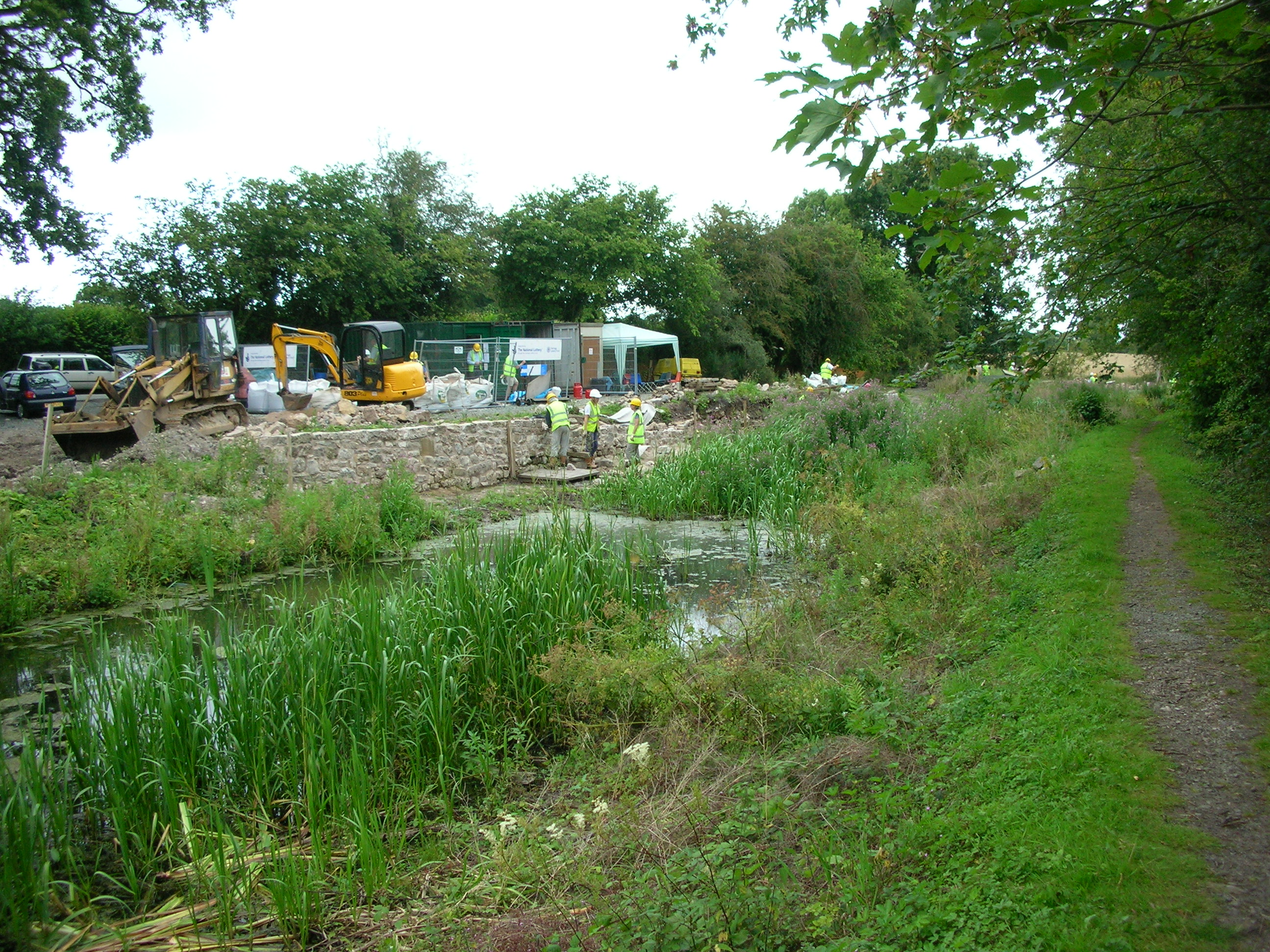
Restoration near Crickheath Basin, August 2007

Gallowstree Bridge was opened by David Suchet on 7 June 1992. The canal from Frankton Locks to the River Perry crosses Perry Moor and historically, the bed had no puddling at this point relying instead on the water table of the peat moor to retain the water. Modern agricultural methods had changed this and a new lining using butyl, concrete and gabions was created during 1994. Shrinkage of the peat had caused subsidence of the canal and a new lock was built with a drop of 2.5 feet (0.76 m). On 3 June 1995, the restored section between Frankton Locks and the aqueduct over the River Perry was opened and the new lock was named the Graham Palmer lock, after the man who had been instrumental in so much canal restoration through the creation of the Waterway Recovery Group. The section onwards to Queen's Head, a hamlet on the A5 trunk road, followed on 21 September 1996 extending the length of navigable canal connected to the national network to 4 miles (6 km). The 2.5-mile (4 km) section from Maesbury to Redwith benefitted from European Regional Development funding awarded in 2000 but there were fears that restoration might be hampered by the designation of large lengths of the canal in Powys as a Site of Special Scientific Interest (SSSI) by the Countryside Council for Wales. Negotiations took place between the Trust, the Council and English Nature to ensure that this did not happen and an agreement was eventually worked out in 2005 which would ensure that the flora and fauna would be protected by off-line nature reserves, to allow full navigation on the main line of the canal.

In the autumn of 2002 work was started on the restoration of Newhouse Lock, the penultimate lock on the southern section still owned by British Waterways. Soon after work started, it became evident that there were structural problems which had not been apparent when the first engineering inspection had been carried out. Further funding was obtained and the quality of the work done by volunteers resulted in them completing some of the tasks originally assigned to professionals. £250,000 was spent on the project, significantly less than the revised budget, and the contribution of volunteer labour was valued at £45,000. The restoration was completed six months ahead of schedule in 2006 and the lock was opened officially on 25 June 2006 by Lembit Opik MP in conjunction with the Annual Montgomery Dinghy Dawdle. The restoration of the lock was named Welsh Project of the Year by the Royal Institution of Chartered Surveyors in May 2007. This completed the restoration of all of the locks on the section of the canal owned by British Waterways and was the eleventh lock on the Welsh section of the canal to be restored by the Shropshire Union Canal Society.

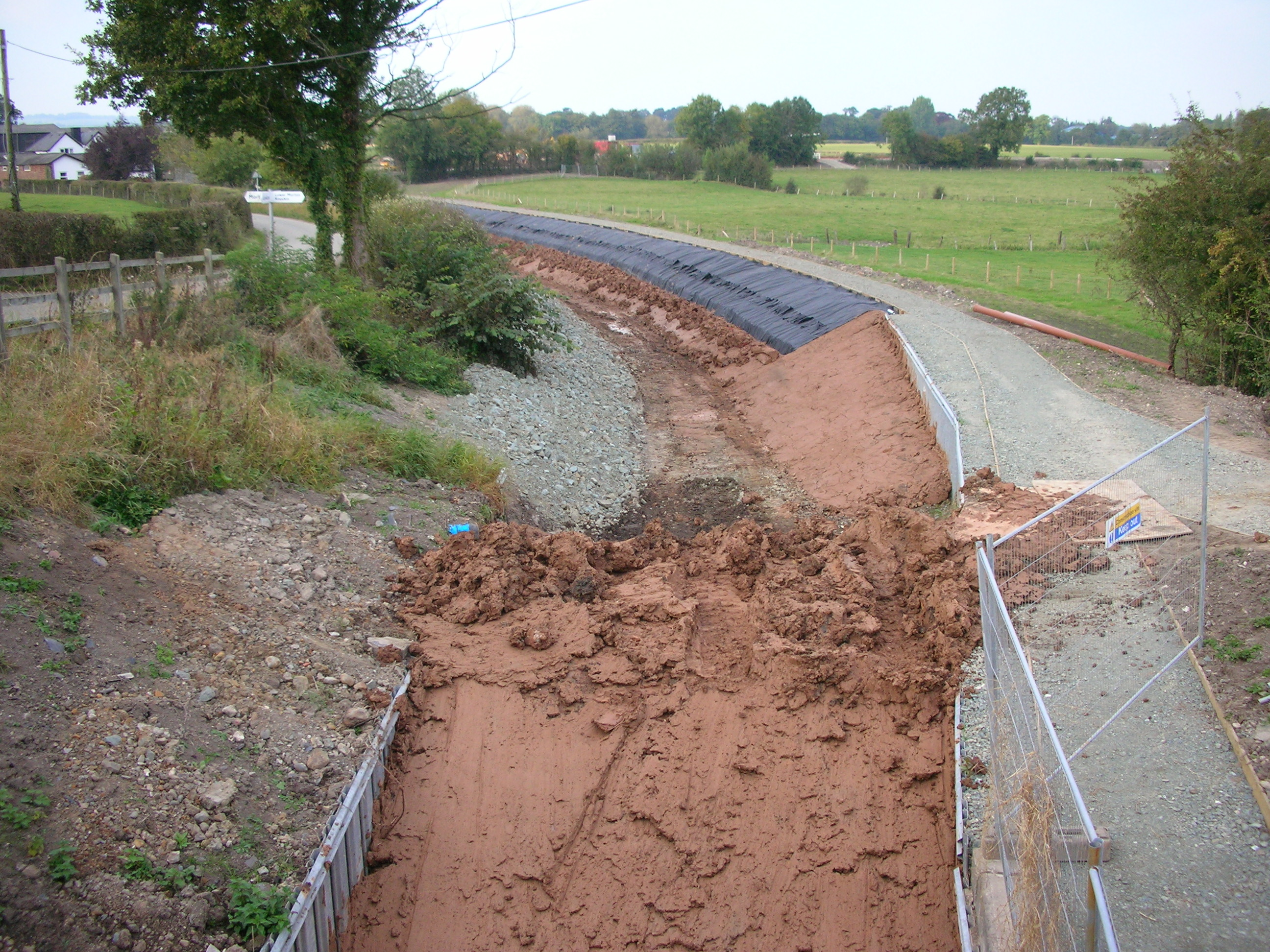
Puddle clay lining and temporary end stop at Redwith Bridge, October 2007

In 2003, the 3-mile (5 km) section from Queen's Head to Gronwen Wharf passing through the village of Maesbury Marsh was reopened. Another 875-yard (800 m) section from Gronwen Wharf to Redwith Bridge (No. 83) was filled with water in October 2007. Rare flora and fauna were accommodated by the construction of an off-line nature reserve on land leased by British Waterways for 50 years. The cost of the reserve added an extra £250,000 to the projected cost and this was partially funded by the Heritage Lottery Fund and EU Interreg funds. Restoration then started on the 490-yard (450 m) section onwards to Pryces Bridge (No. 84). Rebuilding of the channel involved the laying of over 40,000 concrete bricks on top of a Bentonite membrane. The refurbished channel was opened on 19 July 2014 by Owen Paterson, the MP for North Shropshire, but because there was no winding hole at the end of it, the limit of navigation remained at Gronwen Wharf for most boats.

In 2007, restoration of Crickheath Basin was started by the Shropshire Union Canal Society though in 2008, work was postponed due to land ownership issues. Between 2014 and 2022, the section of canal between Pryces Bridge and Crickheath Bridge was restored. This was aided by the award of a National Lottery grant in 2016. The section was officially opened on 2 June 2023. As there is a winding hole at Crickheath Basin, just north of Crickheath Bridge, re-opening allowed navigation of the canal between Redwith Bridge and Crickheath Bridge.

=== Current restoration projects ===
Restoration of the section of canal between Crickheath Bridge (No.85) and Schoolhouse Bridge (No.86) started in 2023. A separate project to rebuild the dropped Schoolhouse Bridge was completed in 2024. Once restoration between Crickheath Bridge and Schoolhouse Bridge is complete, it will not be possible to re-open this section for navigation until restoration reaches the winding hole just south-west of Waen Wen Bridge (No.87).

A joint bid by Powys County Council and the Canal and River Trust for funding to further restore the canal between Llanymynech and Arddleen succeeded when in October 2021, the Chancellor of the Exchequer, Rishi Sunak, announced the award of nearly £16 million for the purpose as part of his annual budget. The award came from the government's 'Levelling Up Fund', and covered restoration of 4.4 miles (7.1 km) in Wales. The money had to be spent by the spring of 2024 but did not include the restoration of two dropped bridges at Arddleen and Maerdy or the renovation of Vyrnwy Aqueduct. An 11-month extension was granted in March 2025 following delays caused by spiralling construction costs and difficulties in buying the land needed to achieve the aims of the project. This should see Aberbechan Aqueduct restored, dredging of the channel between Llanymynech and Arddleen carried out, replacement of Carreghofa Lane Bridge, and the installation of a new lifting bridge to replace Williams Bridge (No.96). The new deadline for completion was February 2026. By August 2026, the box culvert and troughs of the new Carreghofa Lane Bridge were complete, and the wing walls were being constructed. Planning permission for Williams Bridge was still awaited.

As restoration progressed, the need for an umbrella organisation to co-ordinate activity became obvious. The Montgomery Waterway Restoration Trust was set up in 1980 to perform this task. It is made up of members from Shropshire Council (formerly Shropshire District Council, the Borough of Oswestry and North Shropshire District Council until they merged in 2009), Powys County Council, the King's Trust (formerly the Prince's Trust), Shropshire Wildlife Trust, Montgomeryshire Wildlife Trust, the Inland Waterways Association, the Shropshire Union Canal Society and the Waterway Recovery Group. Until 2012, the canal was owned by British Waterways, with whom the trust had a good working relationship, and this has continued with the Canal & River Trust, who succeeded them. In 2023, Crickheath Basin remained the limit of navigation for larger powered craft on the northern section of the canal which is connected to the Llangollen Canal and the wider Canal & River Trust network at Frankton Junction. A very short isolated section of navigable canal exists in Llanymynech and a separate longer navigable section exists in the Welshpool area.

== Architecture ==
The lock gear on the Eastern Branch of the Montgomeryshire were of a different design to those on other canals. Whereas most other canal locks have culverts in the side walls to fill and empty the lock, with paddles opening and closing vertically, the locks on the Montgomeryshire were designed with a culvert in the base of the canal with the paddle sliding horizontally over the culvert. During operation, this can lead to a large whirlpool being observed. To operate the paddle, the winding gear is purely a geared design rather than rack and pinion. An effect of this is that there is no pawl to be operated and the paddles cannot be accidentally dropped shut. The paddle gear was designed by George W. Buck, who was appointed Engineer of the Eastern branch in 1819, and Clerk to the Western branch in 1822.

Many of the lock gates on the Montgomeryshire Canal were replaced with cast iron gates. These gates were curved with tubular cast iron balance beams. The last surviving pair were removed from Welshpool and taken to Stoke Bruerne Canal Museum in 1964.

Bridge numbers on the Montgomery sections of the canal continue on from the Llanymynech Branch of the Ellesmere Canal at Frankton Junction. The first bridge on the Montgomery Canal (Lockgate Bridge) is therefore number 71, the numbering beginning at Hurleston Junction. Because of this, the Llangollen Canal has two separate series of bridge numbering, one ending at Frankton Junction and the other beginning at Frankton Junction.

== Nature conservation ==
In the years following the closure of the canal, wildlife flourished. The whole of the Welsh section was designated as a Site of Special Scientific Interest (SSSI) and is a Special Area of Conservation. Parts of the English section, notably the section from the Aston Locks to Keeper's Bridge, was designated as an SSSI in 1986. These sections are notable for the largest population of Floating Water Plantain in Britain and for Grass-wrack pondweed. The Montgomeryshire Wildlife Trust are convinced that re-opening the waterway to motorised boats would be detrimental to the wildlife in the SSSIs and are actively campaigning against it.

To preserve the wildlife, nature reserves have been created at points along the canal. These include Rednal Basin, most of the Weston Branch and a specially constructed reserve alongside the Aston Locks. Some winding holes have been given over to nature, with boat barriers used to protect one near Crofts Mill Lift Bridge, and the one adjacent to Park Mill Bridge having been allowed to become overgrown. Newt enclosures have been erected to protect the habitat of great crested newts on the Pryces Bridge to Crickheath section.

== Towpath ==
The towpath of almost all the canal is used as a footpath. The section between Pool Quay Lock and Newtown forms part of the Severn Way. Shorter sections south of Llanymynech and Pool Quay are followed by the Offa's Dyke Path.

== Route ==
=== Frankton Junction to Carreghofa ===
This section was originally the Llanymynech branch of the Ellesmere Canal but since the passing of the British Waterways Act 1987, it is officially the first section of the Montgomery Canal. The previous history is reflected in the numbering of the bridges which start from 71 following on from a sequence which begins at Hurleston Junction where the Llangollen Canal meets the main line of the Shropshire Union Canal. Bridge 70 was Rowsons Bridge, immediately beyond Frankton Junction, which also carried the number 1(W). The issue has been slightly confused since 2015, when the grade II listed Lockgate Bridge gained a number plate showing '70', rather than the historically correct 71. The section of the canal from Frankton Junction to Crickheath Wharf (just north of Bridge 85) is navigable by narrowboat.

Access through the locks at Frankton Junction is strictly controlled and must be booked in advance. The locks are operated by a Canal and River Trust lock-keeper and passage was only allowed between 09:00 am and 1:00 pm in 2025. The number of boats using the locks is restricted to a maximum of twelve in either direction on any one day and having passed down the locks onto the canal, boaters must stay for a minimum of one day and a maximum of 14. Repeat visits cannot be made within six weeks of leaving the canal. The locks consist of a two-chamber staircase lock and two single locks. Alongside the locks are several canal buildings including a boatbuilder's house. The remains of a dry dock can be seen in the garden and it was here that the grain boat Cressy was converted for leisure use in 1929 by Jack Beech. The boat was bought by L.T.C. Rolt in 1939, who used it to tour the decaying canal network and was instrumental in the setting up of the Inland Waterways Association. A plaque commemorating this was attached to the lock entrance and unveiled by his widow, Sonia Rolt, on 17 January 2009.

The now-infilled Weston Branch, which terminated at a wharf at Weston Lullingfields branches off between Frankton Locks and Lockgate Bridge. Only a short section remains, part of which is used for mooring and part as a nature reserve. There is a Canal & River Trust amenity block alongside. Just beyond the junction is Lockgate Bridge (71), a red-brick humped-back road bridge dating from 1785 which remains almost in its original state. It is a grade II listed structure.

The canal passes through a peat bog which has been drained since the construction of the canal. This lowering of the water level has meant that during restoration the canal had to be lined to prevent leakage and a new lock was required to lower the water level. This lock was named Graham Palmer Lock after the founder of the Waterway Recovery Group. The Perry Aqueduct crosses the River Perry and was replaced during restoration. The old aqueduct had three small arches and restricted the flow on the river in flood conditions. As it was in a poor state of repair, it was replaced by a single span steel structure. Beyond the aqueduct, the canal is very straight as a diversion was built in 1822. (The original route of the canal had followed a less direct path at the insistence of one of the Proprietors, who wanted the canal to serve his Woodhouse Estate.)

Rednal Basin was originally used for transshipment between the canal and the Chester and Shrewsbury Railway. This finished in the 1850s and it subsequently served a bone mill. Although the link to the basin still exists and there is a swing bridge over the entrance, it is not used for boats as it is a nature reserve. At Queen's Head the canal passes under both the old and the new A5 road. There are mooring spaces and some Canal & River Trust buildings at Queen's Head. Following Queen's Head are the three Aston Locks. The top lock has a nature reserve alongside, built during restoration.

The canal passes through Maesbury Marsh, a village built largely alongside the canal. Canal Central, an environmentally-friendly building incorporating a post office, shop, tearoom, accommodation and bike and canoe hire was built alongside the canal just to the west of Spiggots Bridge (No.80) in 2006. It has a miniature railway and offers horse-drawn boat trips during the summer. Mooring is available along sections of the canal at Maesbury Marsh. Bridge 81 is a lift bridge, which requires a windlass to operate, and immediately to its west, the Mill Arm (or Peate's Branch) has been restored for much of its length giving access to a boatyard and private moorings. A feeder from Morda Brook enters the arm at its far end, where Maesbury Hall Mill was located. This was a corn mill worked by A & A Peate, from whom the arm gets its alternative name.

Crickheath Wharf, just north of Bridge 85, was the end of the northern navigable section from 2023. The next section through Pant to Llanymynech is dry but restoration continues to take place to close the gap with the next navigable section. In this section, the demolished Schoolhouse Bridge was rebuilt in 2024 but no other bridges needed to be replaced and there are no locks. Through Pant, the canal ran alongside the Oswestry and Newtown Railway which later became part of the Cambrian Railways network. The Cambrian Railways Trust has restored a short section of the line between Llynclys and Pant and has built a halt at Penygarreg Lane near to the canal. The railway opened as a visitor attraction in 2005. To the south of Pant, the canal was blocked where a railway bridge had been replaced by an embankment, which was removed in 2018 using volunteer labour.

Since 2006, a short section either side of Llanymynech has been navigable and boats can turn around at a winding hole at each end. The wharf at Llanymynech has been restored. Canal trips are provided on this stretch by the narrowboat George Watson Buck. As the canal passes underneath Llanymynech Bridge it passes from Shropshire, England into Powys, Wales.

The section of canal from south of Llanymynech to Carreghofa is in water although Carreghofa Lane now crosses the canal just to the north of Walls Bridge (No. 93) and this new crossing, built after the canal's closure, obstructs the canal. Plans for a replacement bridge were approved in February 2025 by Powys Council, and construction was expected to be completed by early 2026.

Wern Aqueduct was built after the canal was originally opened to allow a newly constructed branch of the Shropshire and Montgomeryshire Railway to pass below. A temporary diversion of the canal was put in place to allow construction of the aqueduct and the entrances to the diversion remain visible. The stubs of the diversion are now nature reserves.

A feeder from the River Tanat enters the canal above Carreghofa Locks. It was the failure of the weir on the river and the threat of the canal losing its water supply that caused the Shropshire Union Canal Society to begin their campaign for the restoration and reopening of the canal. The weir was repaired in the summer of 1970, at a cost of £12,000.

The end of the Llanymynech Branch of the Ellesmere Canal joins end-on to the Eastern Branch of the Montgomeryshire Canal at Carreghofa Locks.

=== Eastern Branch ===
The section of the canal from Carreghofa to Arddleen is in water although three bridges have been lowered. These are Williams Bridge (No.96), Maerdy Bridge (No.102) and Ardleen Bridge (No.103). By late 2025, the preferred solution for Williams Bridge was to replace the low-level structure with a lift bridge. Between the two Carreghofa Locks is a side pond. This was built as the pound between the locks is short. The Tanet feeder used to enter the side pond to feed the canal, prior to it being rerouted in 1822.

Near the Vyrnwy Aqueduct, arches were built in the embankment of the canal to provide protection from flooding of the River Vyrnwy. The aqueduct itself has been repaired and strengthened in the 1820s, 1890s and 1970s. It sometimes can be seen to leak into the River Vyrnwy though the leaks self-heal. Unlike the nearby Chirk Aqueduct and Pontcysyllte Aqueduct, which have cast iron troughs, the Vyrnwy Aqueduct is built of stone and is puddled. The weight of this structure led to it being strengthened with tie bars and girders in the 1820s.

Maerdy Bridge (102) was lowered in 1949, while Arddleen Bridge (103) was lowered in the 1970s, when the A483 road was upgraded. At the time, it was suggested that a new lock could be built to the north of Arddleen Bridge, and the canal lowered by removing the top lock at Burgedin, to the south of Arddleen Bridge. The contractors built a bridge, but it is submerged as the canal is still at its original level. Plans by 2024 were rather different. Rather than lowering the level of over 1 mile (1.6 km) of canal by 8 feet (2.4 m) and demolishing a historic lock, the idea is to build a drop-pound, with a lock either side of the bridge, and a short length of canal at a lower level between them. An extra overflow and some back-pumping would be required. The Canal and River Trust are talking to the UK Government and the Welsh Assembly about funding for such a scheme. South of Arddleen Bridge the canal is navigable for 12 miles (19 km) to Refail (Efail-Fach) Bridge.

The Guilsfield Arm never actually reached Guilsfield. The arm was 2.25 miles (3.6 km) long with a wharf at its terminus. It was level, with no locks or tunnels, and this was achieved by a cutting 600 feet long and up to 20 feet deep. Today the arm is cut off from the main line by a lowered bridge. A short section has been made into a nature reserve and beyond that, the arm is dry.

The pound below Burgedin Bottom Lock is the sump pound of the canal, the Eastern Branch of the Montgomeryshire being filled by lockings from the Ellesmere, the Tanat feeder at Carreghofa, and originally by a feeder from the River Rhiw at Berriew, which entered the canal to the north of Berriew Aqueduct, but no longer does so.

The canal through Welshpool was one of the first sections to be restored in 1969 when it was proposed that the route of the canal be used for a bypass. Changing attitudes to the restoration of the canal were highlighted when the A483 Welshpool Bypass was built in the late 1980s, following a different route to the 1969 plans. As part of the project, the original course of the road, now the A458, was upgraded. It crosses the canal at Whitehouse Bridge (No.120 ) and Gallowstree Bridge (No.117). At Whitehouse Bridge, the canal was diverted to the west, enabling the road to cross it nearer to Welshpool, where headroom was sufficient. Around 200 yards (180 m) of the old channel were retained as a nature reserve. Another small diversion at Gallowstree Bridge enabled a similar solution to be adopted there.

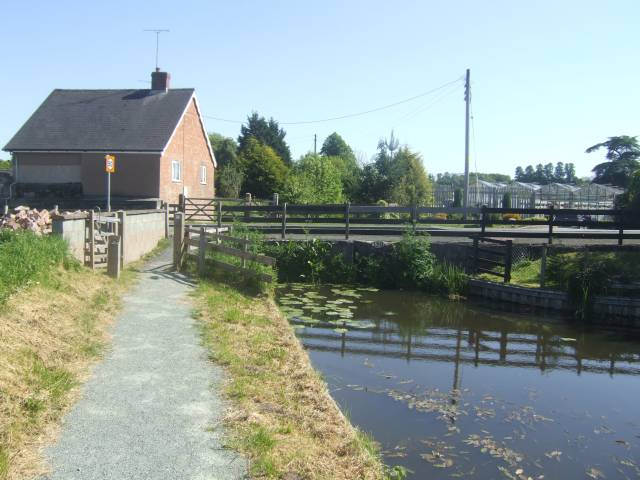
The culvert that was once bridge 129 marked the end of the navigable section in 2009.

=== Western Branch ===
The section of the canal from Refail (Efail-Fach) Bridge to Freestone Lock is in water and heads in a generally south-westerly direction. Four bridges have been lowered including bridges under the A483 which runs in the same direction as the canal traversing it in places. At Garthmyl, the canal comes closest to the town of Montgomery, but it is still around 3 miles (5 km) away. At Brynderwyn, there is a lock with a whitewashed cottage, once the home of the lockkeeper. To the north of the lock was Brynderwyn Wharf, once a coal wharf, and the towpath briefly changes from the eastern side to the west between bridges 145 and 146 to accommodate it. Several of the bridges on this section of canal are made from cast iron from nearby Brymbo. Glanhafren Bridge (No.143) carries the date 1889 and has ornate balustrades made from cast iron while bridge 147, which carries Brynderwen New Road over the canal to the north of Abermule, dates from 1853.

To the south of Abermule, the A483 cuts across the bed of the canal at an angle. This section of road is relatively recent as the road crossed over the canal at bridge 147 and ran to the east of Abermule when the 1975 Ordnance Survey map was published, but the Abermule western bypass had been built by 1983. To the south-west, Byles Lock and Newhouse Lock continue the ascent towards Newtown. At Aberbechan, a three-arched aqueduct carries the canal over Bechan Brook, a tributary of the River Severn. Nearby are the remains of a corn mill and some maltings. The final bridge on the watered section, no. 153, includes the cast lettering "Brymbo 1862". Immediately afterwards is Freestone Lock, beyond which the canal is dry.

Below bridge 153, water enters the canal from the Penarth Weir on the River Severn. The weir is to the south of the lock and is an unusual double-tiered structure. It was constructed by Josiah Jessop in 1813-1814 and there is a modern salmon leap on its western side. The weir can be reached from the lock by following a footpath. Between the river and the canal are the former settling beds of Dolfor Sewage Treatment Works, now maintained as a wildlife haven by the Montgomeryshire Wildlife Trust. The section of the canal from Freestone Lock to Newtown is largely filled-in and the site of the basin in Newtown, together with the last 0.5 miles (0.80 km) of the route, has become a housing estate. A public footpath follows the route of the canal for most of the distance passing the sites of Dolfor Lock and Rock Lock on its way. The Montgomery Waterway Restoration Trust acquired the site of Dolfor Lock and several hundred yards of canal in the 2020s, when it was offered for sale.

The Newtown Pumphouse raised water from the River Severn to the canal, initially using an undershot water wheel to operate two bucket pumps. This was supplemented by a steam engine for times when the waterwheel failed to provide sufficient power. In time, this arrangement was replaced by a diesel-powered pump but pumping was discontinued in the 1940s. The building, which originally had a tall chimney, still exists and was in private ownership, but was acquired by Newtown Council in early 2024. They subsequently reinstated some of the towpath nearby.

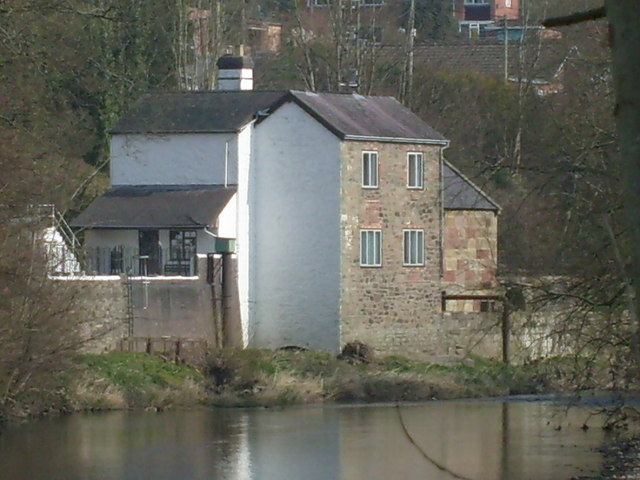
The Newtown pumping station seen from across the River Severn. The intake pipe can still be seen.

== Points of interest ==
Point	Coordinates (Links to map resources)	OS Grid Ref	Notes
Frankton Junction	52.8804°N 2.9369°W	SJ37043184	Llangollen Canal/Montgomery Canal junction
Gronwen Wharf and Bridge No. 82	52.8152°N 3.0337°W	SJ30422468	Gronwen winding hole, wharf and bridge
Redwith lift bridge No. 82A	52.8127°N 3.0383°W	SJ30112441	New 2009
Redwith Bridge No. 83	52.8101°N 3.0385°W	SJ30092412	
Pryces Bridge No. 84	52.8084°N 3.0434°W	SJ29762393	
Crickheath Basin	52.8051°N 3.0511°W	SJ29232357	Limit of navigation after re-opening June 2023
Carreghofa Locks	52.7743°N 3.1068°W	SJ25432020	Ellesmere Canal/Eastern Branch of the Montgomeryshire junction
Guilsfield Arm	52.7244°N 3.1085°W	SJ25231466	
Garthmyl	52.5883°N 3.1944°W	SO19179961	Eastern/Western Branch of the Montgomeryshire junction

== See also ==
- Canals of the United Kingdom

== Bibliography ==
- Arnold, Harry (2003). The Montgomery Canal and its Restoration. Tempus Publishing. ISBN 978-0-7524-1660-1.
- Arnold, Harry (October 2009). "The Big Dig". Waterways World. ISSN 0309-1422.
- BW Act (1987). "British Waterways Act 1987" (PDF). gov.uk.
- Cumberlidge, Jane (2009). Inland Waterways of Great Britain (8th ed.). Imray Laurie Norie and Wilson. ISBN 978-1-84623-010-3.
- Denny, Andrew (March 2018). "Destination Newtown". Waterways World. ISSN 0309-1422.
- Elliott, Steve (April 2025). "WW Guide to the Montgomery Canal". Waterways World. ISSN 0309-1422.
- Denton, John Horsley (1984). Montgomeryshire Canal and the Llanymynech Branch of the Ellesmere Canal. Lapal Publications. ISBN 978-0-9509238-1-9.
- Hadfield, Charles (1985). The Canals of The West Midlands (3rd ed.). Newton Abbot: David & Charles. ISBN 978-0-7153-8644-6.
- Hyde, Jane (21 October 2024). "Bridging the Gap". Canal Boat. Vol. September 2024. Archived from the original on 20 June 2025.
- Ludgate, Martin (21 October 2024). "Bridging the gap". Canal Boat. Archived from the original on 14 January 2025.
- Nicholson (2023). Nicholson Guides Vol 4: Four Counties and the Welsh Canals. Harper Collins. ISBN 978-0-00-854668-7.
- O'Brien, Catherine (June 2010). "Paddling into Powys". Waterways World. ISSN 0309-1422.
- Priestley, Joseph (1831). Historical Account of the Navigable Rivers, Canals, and Railways, of Great Britain. Longman, Rees, Orme, Brown & Green. Archived from the original on 4 March 2016.
- Squires, Roger (2008). Britain's restored canals. Landmark Publishing. ISBN 978-1-84306-331-5.
- Talbot, Andy (August 2006). "Newhouse Lock Reopened". Waterways World. ISSN 0309-1422.
- Waterways World (2005). Canal Guide 2 – Llangollen and Montgomery Canals. Waterways World. ISBN 978-1-870002-89-9.
