= Waterway Recovery Group =

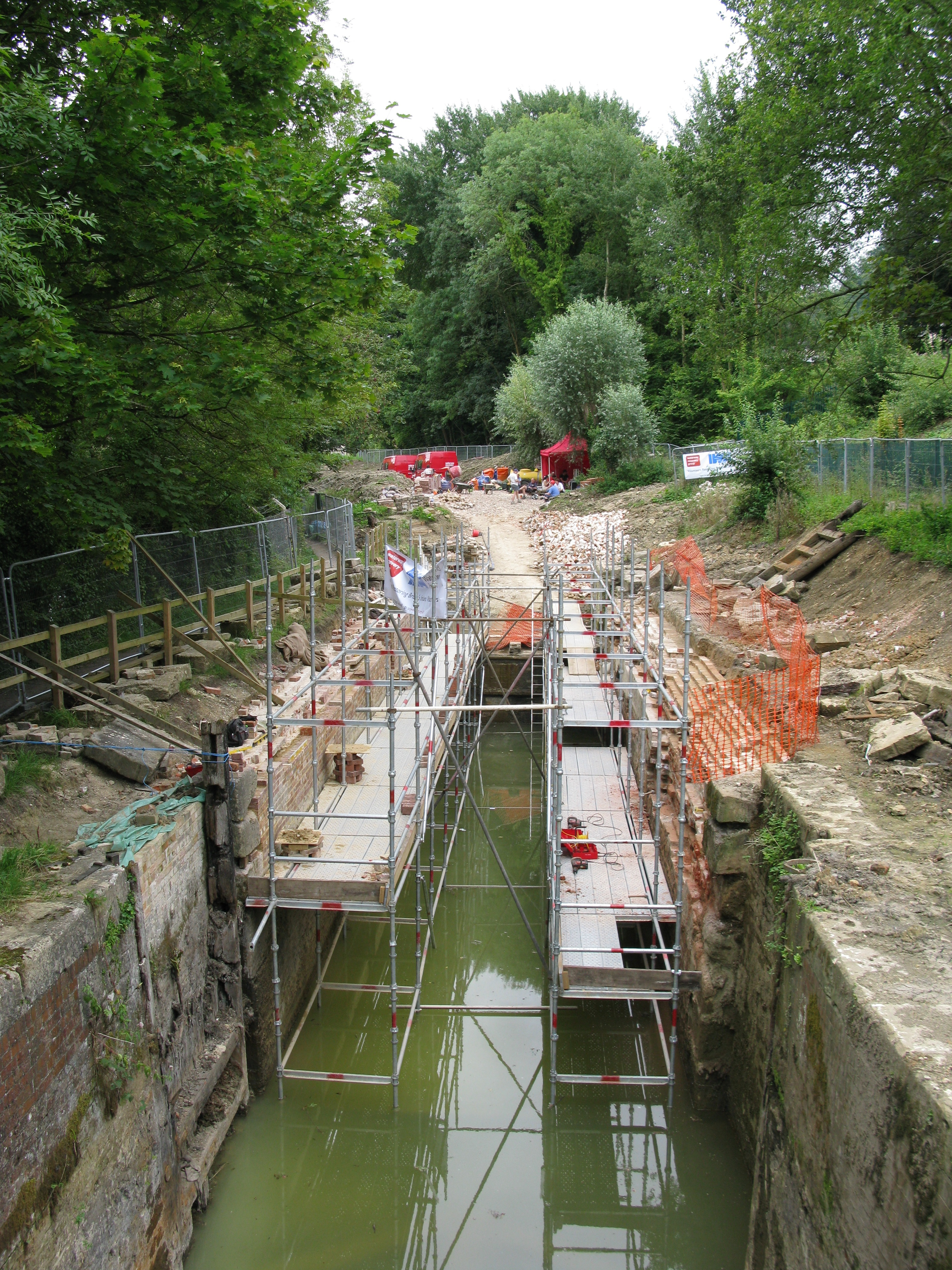
Waterway restoration in progress: Gough's Orchard lock on the Thames and Severn Canal undergoing restoration by Waterway Recovery Group

The Waterway Recovery Group (WRG) is the national co-ordinating body for voluntary labour on the inland waterways of England and Wales. Founded in 1970 as an independent body, it became a division of the Inland Waterway Association in 2002.

== History ==
The formation of the Waterway Recovery Group was a logical progression from events which had happened over the previous eight years. Mr T. Dodwell had been responsible for organising volunteers who had cleared part of the Basingstoke Canal in order to facilitate a boat rally at Woking, which was held in 1962. With this experience in mind, he suggested that the London and Home Counties Branch of the Inland Waterways Association should set up a Working Party Group, whose members would be available to travel around the country, giving help to local restoration schemes as required. The idea was well-received, and working parties on the Kennet and Avon Canal, the Stourbridge Canal and the River Wey were organised and run during the next few months. Just over a year later, the first edition of Navvies Notebook was published. It listed sites where restoration was occurring, so that members could be informed and volunteer as they saw fit.

Navvies Notebook was the idea of Graham Palmer, at the time the secretary of the London and Home Counties Branch. Although its primary function was to outline the work programme of his local group, and report on its achievements, he informed IWA members that any restoration work could be included in it. Working parties planned at Brantham Lock on the River Stour, the River Wey and the Kennet and Avon were announced in the first edition, and there was a report on the progress that had been made at the 16 locks on the Stourbridge Canal. The publication enabled a network of working party organisers to develop. By the end of 1967, 350 copies were being produced each time it was printed. Notable successes included a party of 45 who had worked on the Stourbridge Canal for a weekend, and a party to clear a section of the Kennet and Avon Canal in Reading which had been attended by 97 volunteers.

Another major step forwards was taken in 1968, as part of a renovation scheme around the Ashton Canal, which was semi-derelict at the time. The scheme was called "Operation Spring Clean", and Palmer set about mustering support for "Operation Ashton" through Navvies Notebook. The idea was to demonstrate that a large co-ordinated working party could be organised, and that such a party could achieve much more than a small group of professionals could in a similar time. The working party was held on 21 and 22 September 1968, when over 600 volunteers turned up and demonstrated the value of such an exercise. It attracted considerable publicity, which the IWA recognised as being almost as valuable as the actual work done.

Progress continued through 1969. In the years 1967, 1968 and 1969, the number of working groups, now called "Digs", had risen from 11 to 16 and then 23. Two major events, at Marple on the Peak Forest Canal and at Welshpool on the Montgomery Canal had each attracted over 200 volunteers. The time had come to organise such numbers more formally, and the Waterways Recovery Group was formed in 1970. Navvies Notebook continued to be published until April 1971, when it was renamed Navvies.

The work of the newly formed group continued to grow. In October 1971, Navvies announced a working party on the Grantham Canal, which turned out to be the first of many. Two months later, the British Waterways Board, the Inland Waterways Association, and the local authorities through which the canals ran agreed to restore the lower Peak Forest Canal and the Ashton Canal. Palmer set about organising something that would demonstrate what could be done to the local population. A dig was organised for 25–26 March 1972, with the codename "Ashtac" also known as "Ashton Attack" to represent the event at Ashton Canal. The event was a success, as over 1000 volunteers from all over Britain arrived and removed large quantities of rubbish from the canals. The British Waterways Board were complimentary, and published a document outlining the contributions of volunteers since 1968. On 27–28 October 1973 the Droitwich Dig was another major dig, organised jointly with the Droitwich Canals Trust; WRG used their experience of such campaigns to ensure that the 500 volunteers who attended were put to good use.

== Structure ==
Although originally an independent body, since 2002 WRG has been a division of the Inland Waterways Association. The IWA covers WRG's core costs, while WRG relies on fundraising and voluntary donations to further its restoration aims.

Since 1996 the chairman of WRG has been Mike Palmer.

== Activities ==
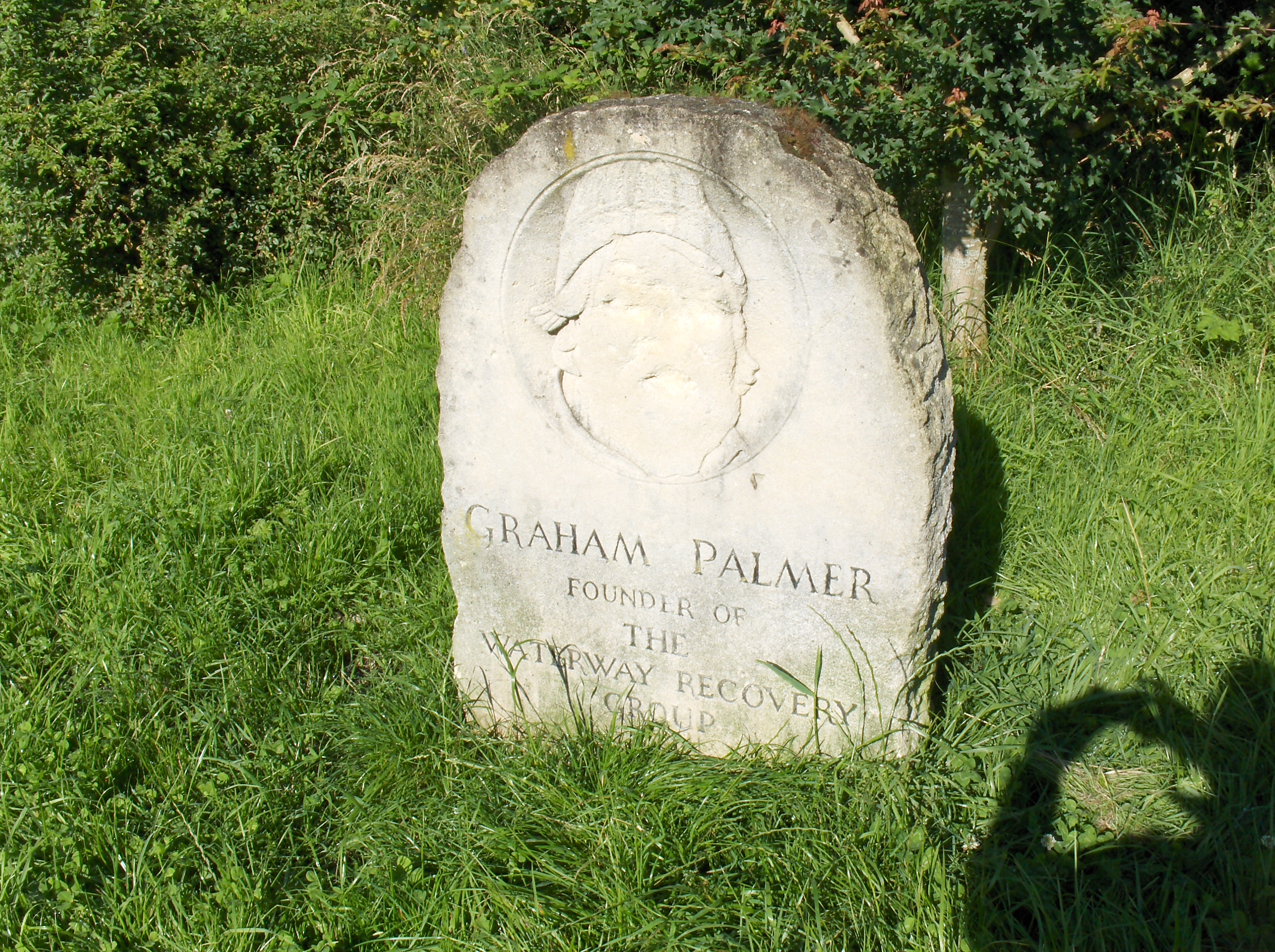
Memorial stone to Graham Palmer, founder of the WRG, located adjacent to Graham Palmer Lock on the Montgomery Canal

WRG have regional groups across England, who co-ordinate weekend visits to restoration projects. The current local groups are London, North West, and Bit In The Middle (mostly the south Midlands); there is also a forestry group. WRG publishes a newsletter titled Navvies six times a year.

WRG run a series of canal camps each year, typically week-long, and open to volunteers of all ages and abilities. The canal camps are 'working holidays', contributing towards restoring canals and navigable waterways throughout the country. There are several such camps throughout the summer, and WRG also run a Christmas camp between Christmas and New Year. The IWA's Restoration Hub contributes towards planning and coordination of the work.

WRG owns a fleet of vans, and a range of plant including excavators, dumpers, pumps, mixers, winches, and other equipment.

WRG also helped to set up, run and tear down the IWA National Festival. The festival was the IWA's primary fundraising activity, and was a chance for boaters and the general public to see the work of both the IWA and WRG.

== See also ==
- List of waterway societies in the United Kingdom
- Waterway restoration

== Bibliography ==
- Squires, Roger (2008). Britain's restored canals. Landmark Publishing. ISBN 978-1-84306-331-5.
