= Edinburgh Union Canal Society =

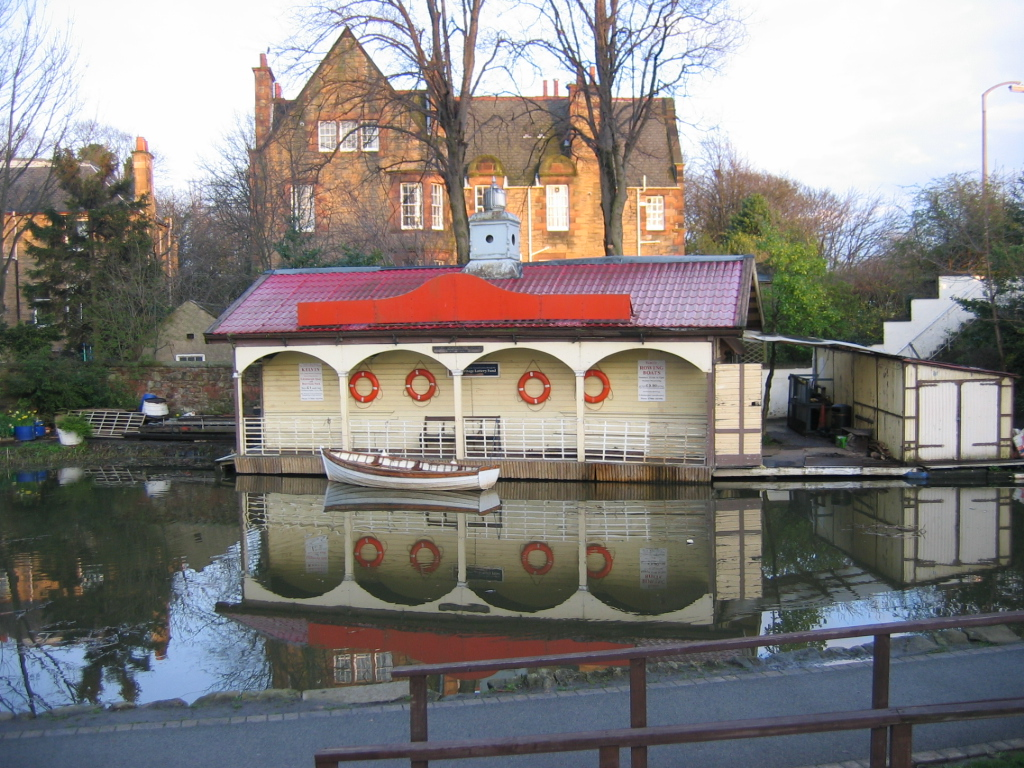

The Edinburgh Union Canal Society is a charitable canal society on the Union Canal in Edinburgh, Scotland. The Society's main base is Ashley Terrace Boathouse at Lockhart Bridge, near Harrison Park in the Polwarth area of Edinburgh.

The society was founded in 1985 and is a founder member of the Scottish Inland Waterways Association.

In partnership with the Forth Canoe Club, the Linlithgow Union Canal Society, the Bridge 19-40 Canal Society, the Seagull Trust and other canal societies on the Scottish Lowland Canals, Edinburgh Canal Society campaigned for many years to have the Union Canal rebuilt, refurbished and re-opened.

The culmination of the campaign was the joining of the Union Canal and the Forth & Clyde Canal by way of the Falkirk Wheel. Edinburgh Canal Society was one of the official Millennium Link Project Partners.

== Boats and boathouse ==
The society owns a wooden historical launch with Kelvin engines; the vessel had sunk in the early 1990s in Fisherrow harbour at Musselburgh after a violent storm. A society member happened to be passing just as the disposal lorry arrived, and the vessel was rescued. In 1999, she was removed to Mackay's boatyard in Arbroath, with help from the Heritage Lottery Fund. The same boatyard had earlier restored Robert Scott's RRS Discovery in Dundee. Obtaining the correct Kelvin engine at first seemed impossible, but by another chance encounter, a Kelvin E2 engine was obtained from a warehouse in Kuwait.

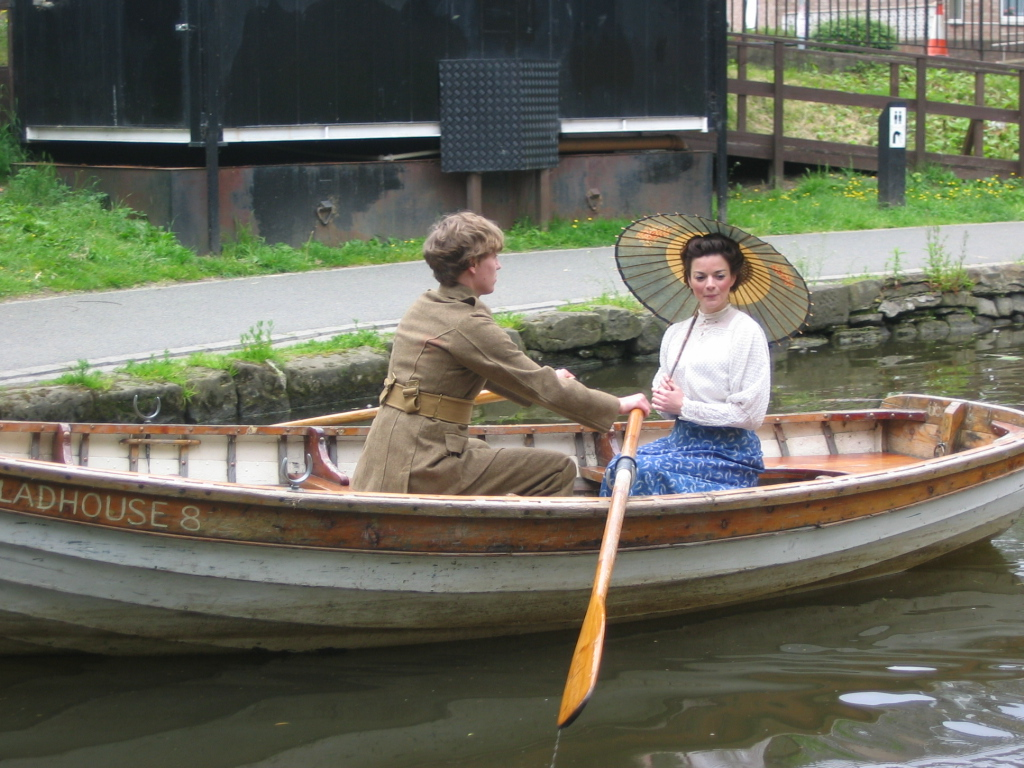

A replica launch was built to meet the demand for more boat trips in both directions of the Union Canal, but this has been disposed of. The society also owns a fleet of wooden rowing boats for hire or charter.

The society's boathouse is one of a large range of iconic buildings and structures on the Scottish Lowland Canals. It was sited originally where the University Rowing Club's boathouse is at present. In 1987 the boathouse was dismantled and rebuilt in modified form at its present site, and it is constantly being refurbished, to the delight of amateur and professional photographers.

In 2008, the Boathouse and one of the rowing boats were a filming location for a creative documentary, commissioned in Ireland and named An Paísti Beo Bocht, about the life of Patrick MacGill, the Irish journalist, author and poet, nicknamed "The Navvy Poet" due to his earlier occupation as navvy on the canals.

In 2009, members of the Society and others were involved in the setting up of the first Edinburgh Canal Festival between Edinburgh Quay and the Society's boathouse at Harrison Park. This event is now an annual one and will take place again in 2012.

In July 2015 the Society had to cease hiring out rowing boats when its boathouse was declared unsafe, pending major repairs.

== Journeys and rallies ==
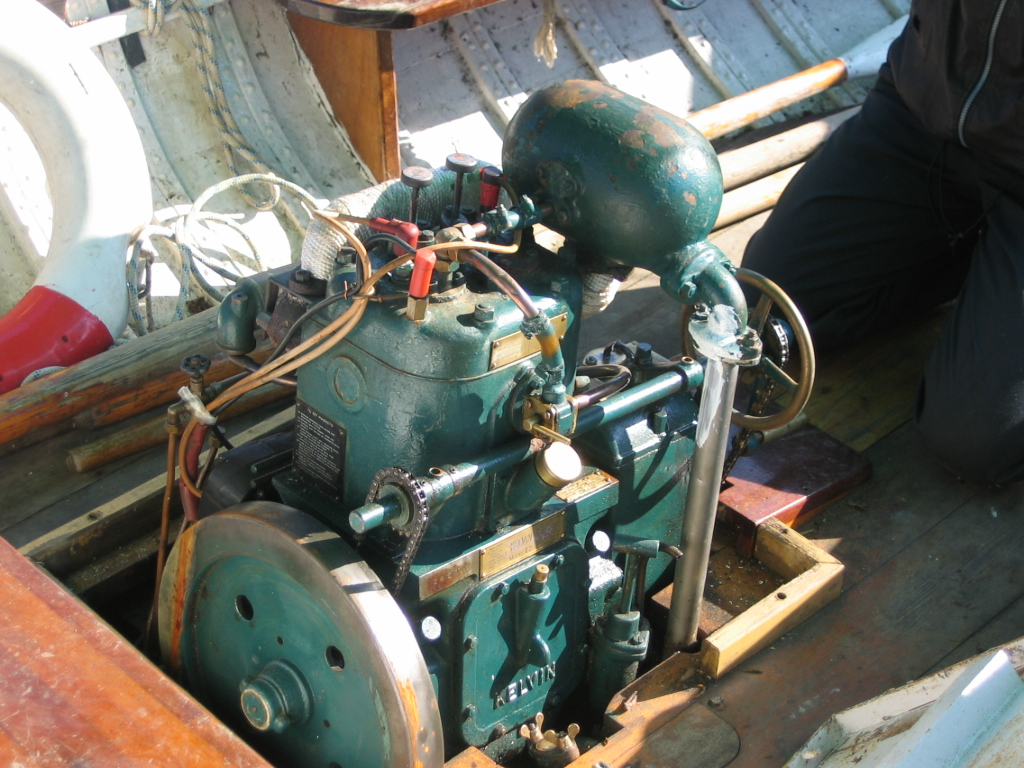
Kelvin Diesel engine

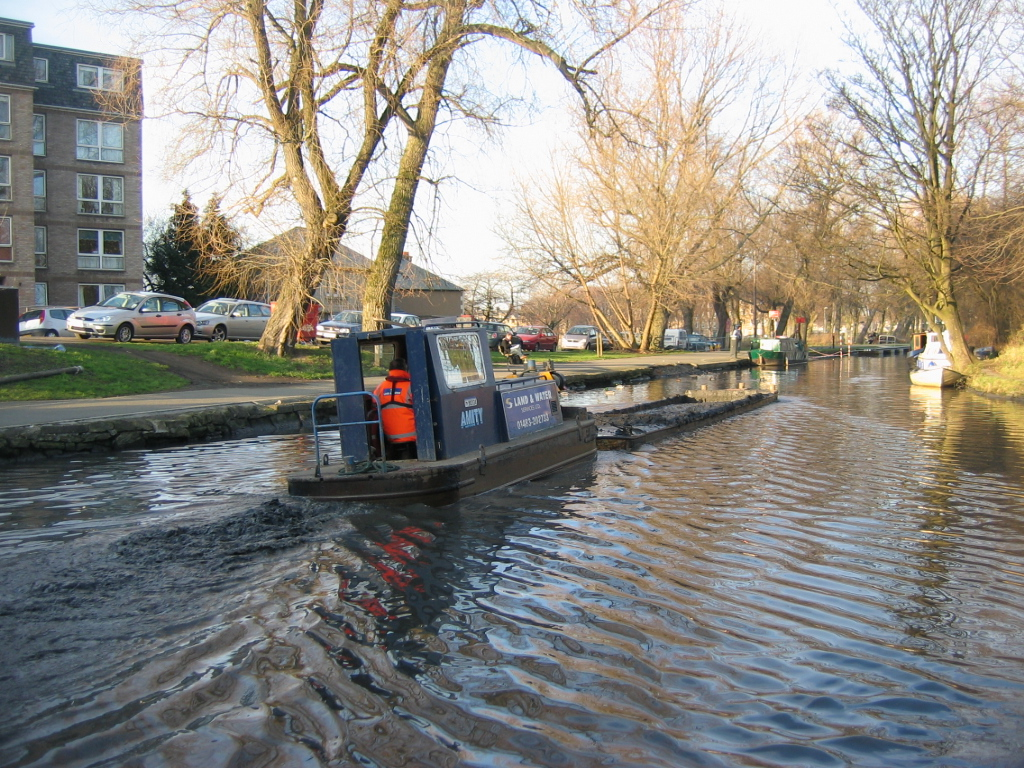
Dredger passing the boathouse

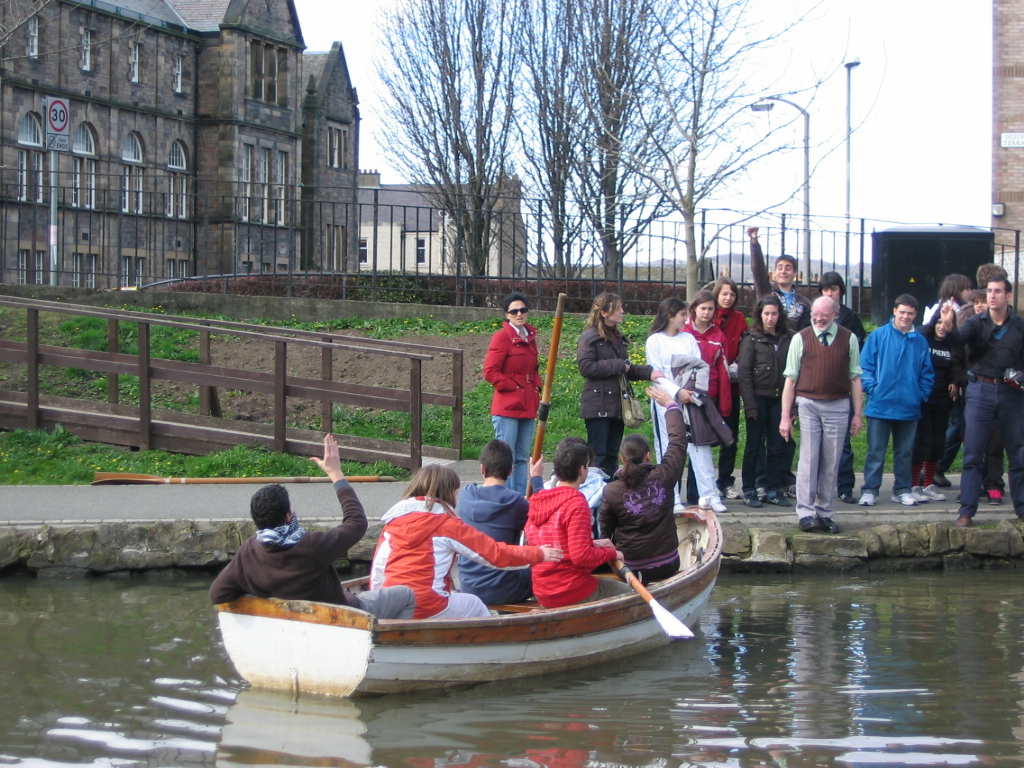
Language students chartering rowing boats

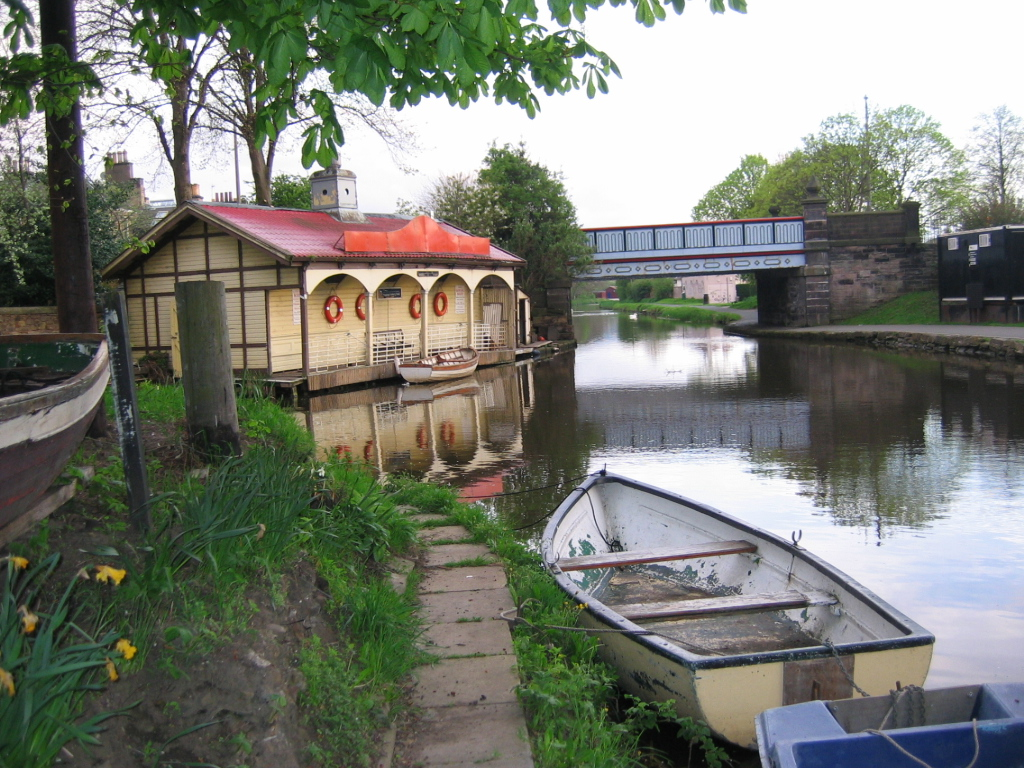
Boathouse and rowing boats

- 17 May 2001 Kelvin's first trip beneath Forth Bridge from Port Edgar
- 24 May 2001 Port Edgar to Carron Sea Lock, Opening of Forth & Clyde Canal
- 25 May 2001 Carron Sea Lock to Lock 15
- 26 May 2001 Camelon to Auchinstarry Basin
- 27 May 2001 Auchinstarry to Temple (Lock 27)
- 28 May 2001 Temple to Bowling Basin
- 25 August 2001 Wester Hailes to Leamington Bridge; Formal Opening of Wester Hailes section of Union Canal
- 20 May 2002 Harrison Park to Falkirk Wheel for Official Opening by HM The Queen on 20 May 2002.
- 2 October 2002 Wester Hailes Gala Day
- 28 March Formal opening of Speir's Wharf
- 1 and 2 April 2003 Glasgow to Falkirk Wheel to Linlithgow
- 17 to 23 April 2003 Leamington Bridge via Falkirk Wheel, Glasgow (Speir's Wharf), Bowling Basin, River Clyde, Carron Sea Lock, to Port Edgar via Inverkeithing.
- 23 May and 13 August 2003 Harrison Park to Falkirk Top Lock
- 25 Sept. 2003 World Canals Conference, Wester Hailes
- 23 March 2004 Falkirk Wheel Lower Basin to Carron Sea Lock
- 4–6 April 2004 Kincardine Pier to Craigforth Weir, Stirling to Carron Sea Lock
- 16 April 2004 Falkirk to Ratho, Edinburgh
- 1 May 2004 Kelvin TWO launched at MacLean's Yard, Renfrew
- 18 to 30 May 2004 Lancaster Canal via Preston, Bilsborrow, Garstang, Galgate, Hest Bank, Glasson Dock, Lancaster, Bolton-le-Sands, Carnforth and Tewitfield.
- 28–30 May 2004 Kelvin Rally, Shardlow, Trent & Mersey Canal
- 15 June 2004 Ratho
- 9 Aug 2004 Kelvin 1 and Kelvin 2 at Winchburgh
- 22 March 2005 Edinburgh Quay Official Opening
- 22 May 2006 Falkirk Top Lock to Harrison Park
- Start of regular Sunday Shuttles from ECS boathouse to Edinburgh Quay and return

== See also ==
- Areas of Edinburgh
- World Canals Conference
- Falkirk Helix
- Office of the Scottish Charity Regulator
