= Tollcross, Edinburgh =

Road junction in Edinburgh, Scotland

Coordinates: 55°56′37.66″N 3°12′13.08″W

Tollcross is a major road junction to the south west of the city centre of Edinburgh, Scotland which takes its name from a local historical land area.

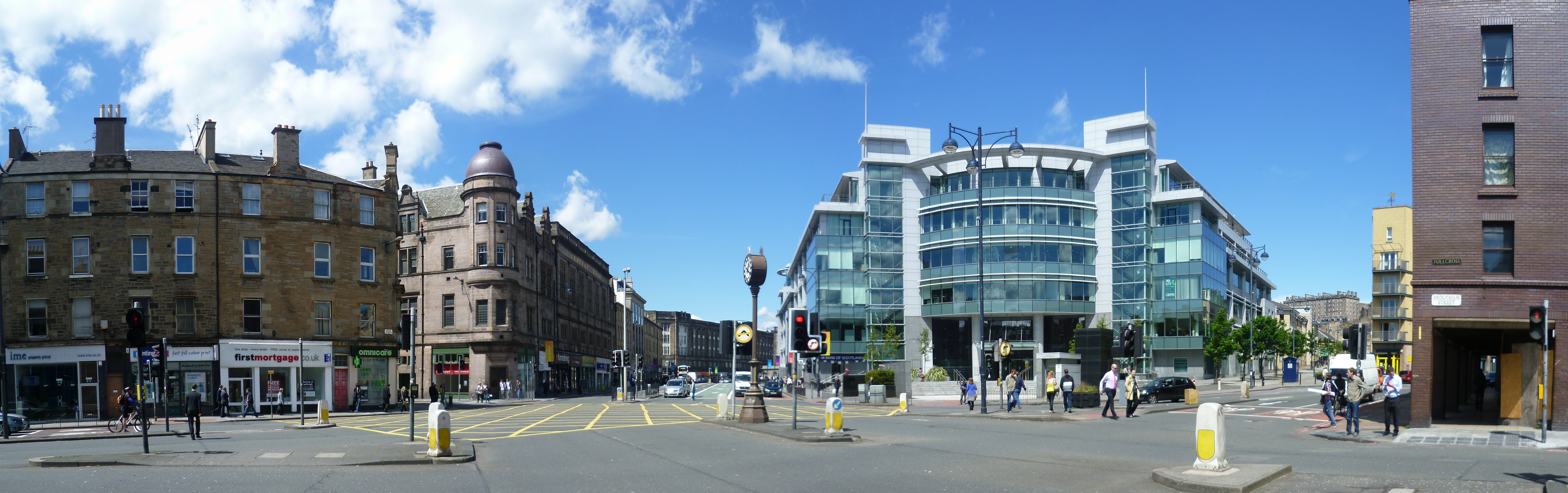
Tollcross junction

It lies between the more affluent area of Bruntsfield and the Grassmarket.

== Origin of the name ==
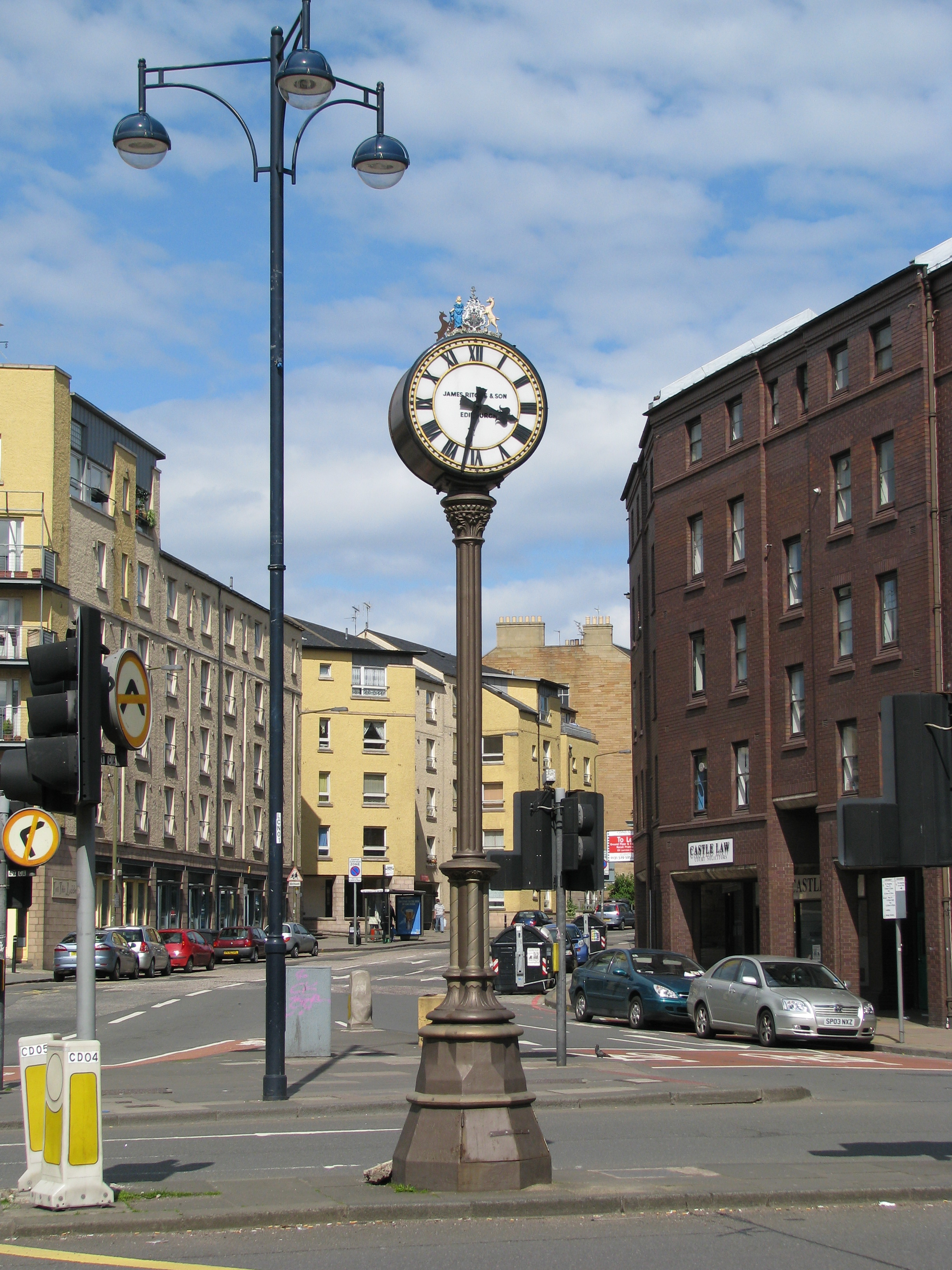
The Queen Victoria Jubilee Clock at the foot of Lauriston Place

The earliest reference to Tollcross dates from 1439 with Tolcors being the typical early form with the cors ending continuing in use to the late 18th century. Towcroce and Tolcroce appear in the early 16th century. Stuart Harris has pointed out that there were no crossroads until modern times and that there is no evidence for such meaning as "toll at a crossroad". He derives the name from cors with cros as a later form (as in Old Welsh toll cors, meaning a boggy hollow) and that the ending -corse would have aptly described the low-lying area beside the now culverted Lochrin Burn running between the slopes of the Burgh Muir and the High Riggs south of the Grassmarket.

From the earliest, the name has referred to an area of land. It is called "Lands of Tolcross" in a 1649 Charter of Charles II: "South parts of Tollcross owned by Major James Weir" in 1814: "That part of the village of Portsburgh called Tollcross" in 1836. The Edinburgh (Streets) Act 1771 (11 Geo. 3. c. 36) made suburbs outside the royalty of Edinburgh into districts, with one of the districts was "to be one District called Toll-Cross".

== Archaeology ==
Archaeological excavations by Headland Archaeology in 2012, as part of a planning condition in advance of development, found evidence of occupation of the area during the Medieval period. The excavations found the transformation of the area from an agricultural landscape to an industrial area, including the remains of the Lochrin Distillery, a slaughterhouses, Edinburgh Ice and Cold Storage Company’s unit, an ice rink and a garage, that had been built over each other.

== Physical description ==
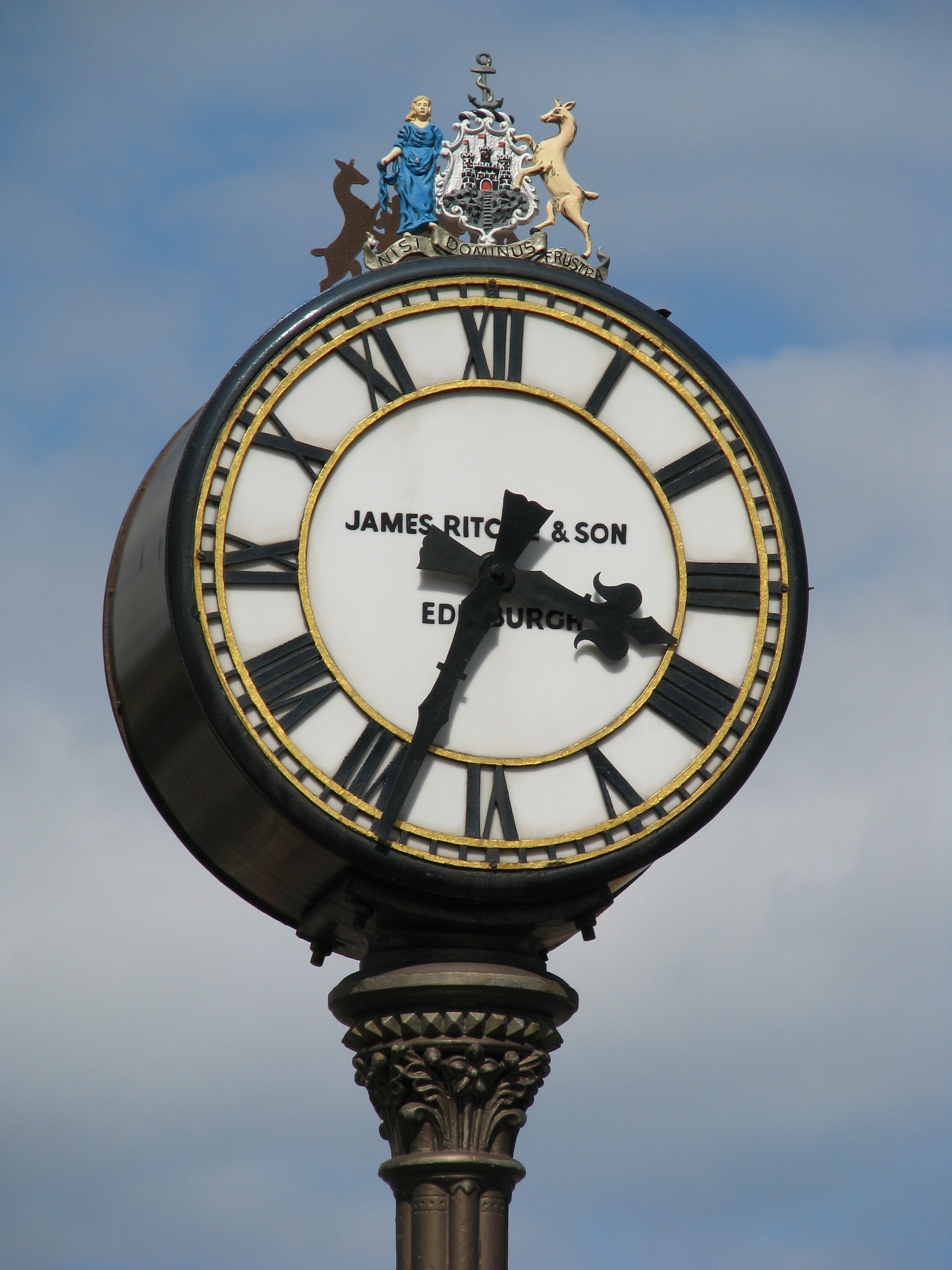
Close-up of the Tollcross clock

The junction is formed by Earl Grey Street (an extension of Lothian Road originally named Wellington Street) to the north, Lauriston Place to the east, Brougham Street to the south-east (leading to Melville Drive which cuts through The Meadows), Home Street to the south (which leads to Bruntsfield), and West Tollcross to the west.

In the middle of the junction, a distinctive ironwork pillar clock, one of the city's landmarks, stood between 1901 and 2022. Many Victorian and Edwardian photographs feature the clock at what was a busy tram hub. It was gifted to the city by Provost James Steel and Treasurer Robert Cranston, and was one of four similar clocks made by the Edinburgh clockmakers, James Ritchie & Son. The skeleton face and pillar were made by Macfarlane Castings. Originally a weight-driven pendulum clock, it was altered to a spring-driven mechanism in 1926. It and the clock at the city's West End were the largest street clocks in Britain to be driven by this type of mechanism. It was wound weekly by a clock-winder employed by Ritchie's, using a crank handle inserted into the base. In 1969, it was converted to an electric mechanism located between the dials. Junction improvements in 1974 led to the clock's removal, causing public consternation, as a result of which it was returned to a spot close to its original position. The clock was removed by the council in March 2022 after an inspection revealed a small crack in its base. The council received a quote of nearly £60,000 for repairs, but as of April 2026 this has not been done and the clock is in storage. In April 2026, the council's finance and resource committee allocated £72,572 for its refurbishment, with aim of returning it close its previous position in Tollcross during 2027.

The southern edge of the area merges with Bruntsfield while to the north and west Tollcross joins Fountainbridge. Lauriston and the rest of the Old Town lie to the East.

== Amenities ==
The area is diverse, with a considerable number of eateries including Indian, Chinese, Thai, French, Spanish and Greek restaurants, Turkish kebab shops, a Sushi bar, Japanese bistro and two traditional fish and chip shops. There is a cluster of services here for the city's Chinese community including a Chinese-language church, two Chinese supermarkets, a travel agent, health store, support centre for the elderly and barber shop. Tollcross Primary School includes the city's Scottish Gaelic-Medium Unit.

The area has many local provision shops including a butcher, greengrocer, bakeries (traditional, Italian and Polish), a supermarket, two mini-supermarkets, five foodstores, one specialising in Oriental foods, and a wine shop. There are two banks, a post office, two bookmakers, seven hairdressers, five clothes shops including two Indian boutiques, a Hindi video store, two clothes alteration shops, four estate agents, three beauty parlours, three jewellers, a bicycle shop, florist, electrical goods shop, art shop, hi-fi retailer, second-hand records shop, musical instruments repairer, tattoo parlour, laundrette and dry-cleaner's. There are around 10 cafés, including an internet café, four newsagents and several charity shops. The area has eight pubs.

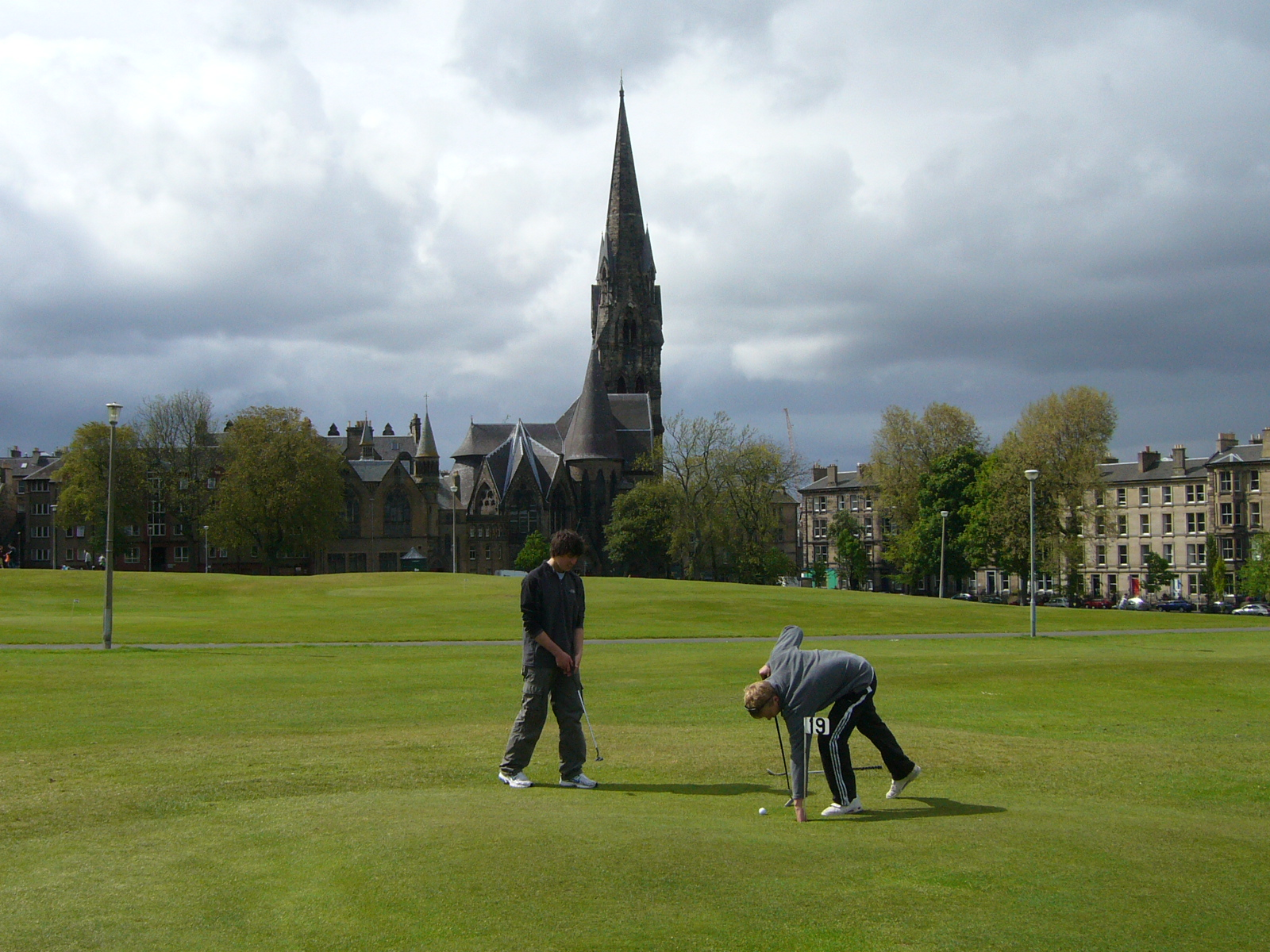
Pitch and Putt on Bruntsfield Links

The King's Theatre and The Cameo cinema are located on Leven Street and Home Street respectively.

There is a modern health centre, two dental clinics, two pharmacies, an optician's, a homeopathic medicines shop, an orthodontist and a chiropractor. Princes Exchange, a large new office development (circa 2000) and home to the corporate arm of the Bank of Scotland, occupies a central position on Earl Grey Street. The area has its own fire station.

The Meadows and Bruntsfield Links are public parks which skirt Tollcross to the east and south, with a children's playpark in each, and, respectively, tennis courts and a 'pitch and putt' course. The Links are claimed to be one of the earliest places where golf was played in Scotland. Town Council Minutes refer to a 'Golfhall' tavern on the Links dating from 1717, and the Bruntsfield Links Golfing Society of Edinburgh, which still exists, was founded in 1761.

== Housing ==
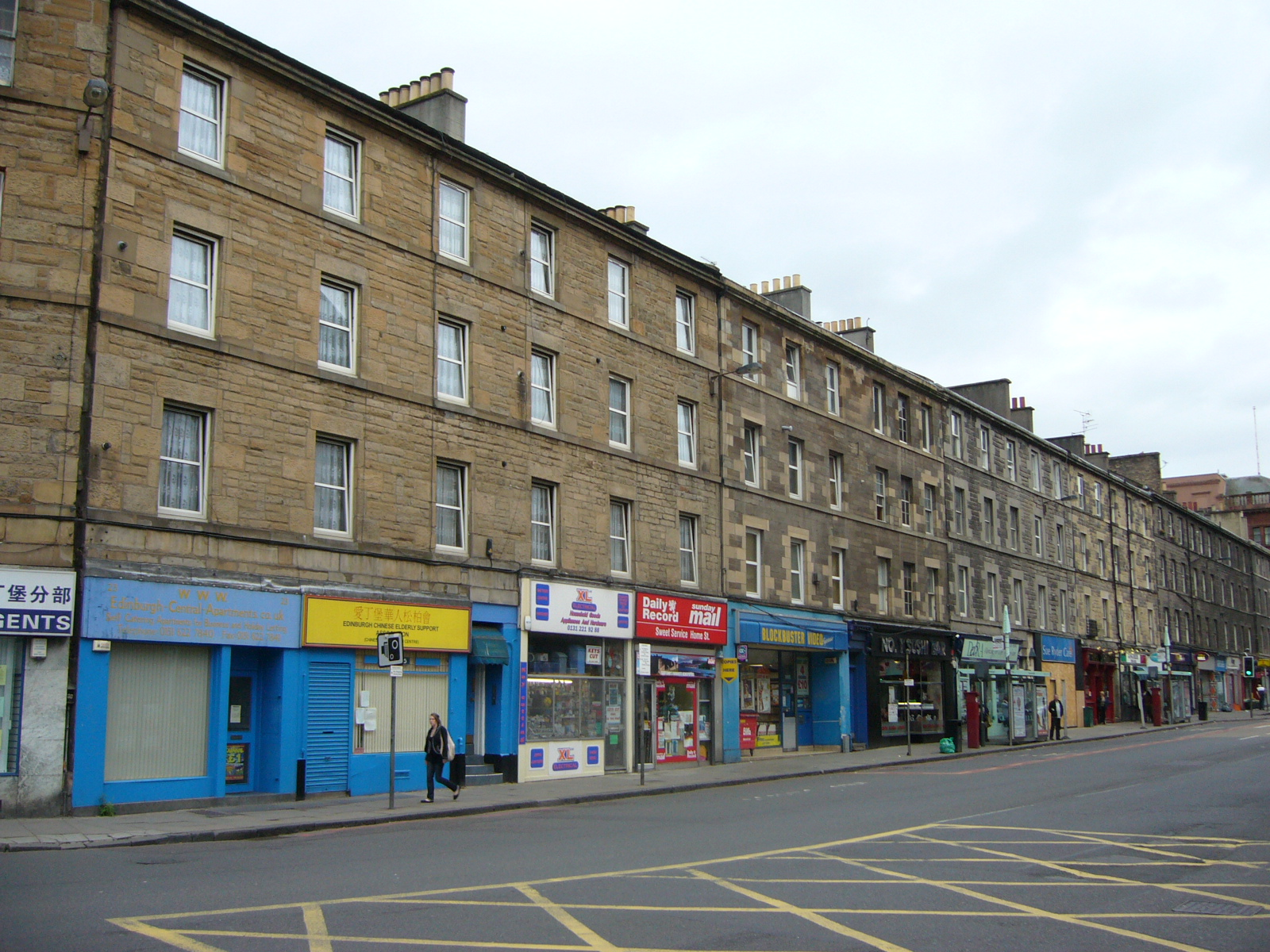
Early 19thC tenements on the east side of Home Street

Housing is mainly in the form of Victorian tenement flats, with a few, later, Dunn & Findlay blocks listed as being of significant local architectural or historical interest. Some buildings from the old village of Wrychtishousis still stand on the west side of Leven Street; others surviving until recently next to the Golf Tavern were replaced in the 1990s by a block of student flats. The four-storey tenements on the east side of Home Street were designed by the New Town architect James Gillespie Graham to provide 'room-and-kitchen' accommodation for poorer families. They were built on land feued from the owner of Drumdryan House (renamed Leven Lodge by an 18th-century owner Lord Leven) which once stood on the site of the King's Theatre. Later owners of the house were the Home-Rigg family who owned Tarvit House in Fife, hence the names of Home Street and Tarvit Street. A later villa, also named Drumdryan House, became enclosed by the surrounding tenements of Home Street and Drumdryan Street before being demolished in 1959. Other early buildings are the residential properties in Gilmore Place, named after Samuel Gilmour, owner of a ropeworks which formerly stood here.

Most of the area's housing was put up in the 1860s and 1870s by James Steel, an entrepreneurial Edinburgh builder who was responsible for many "working-class tenement developments" in various parts of the city; others were the work of small local building associations.

Many students live in the area where Napier University has three separate halls of residence.

== Churches ==
The Church of Scotland parish churches for Tollcross are Barclay Viewforth Church, which dominates views at the southern edge, and St Cuthbert's Church at the northern end of Lothian Road.

Central Hall, a category B-listed building by Dunn & Findlay, is owned by the Methodist Church since 1901, was purchased by Morningside Baptist Church in June 2011. The church uses it for worship services, offices and other activities. At the end of September 2012, its name was changed to Central. The Scottish Episcopal Church is St Michael's and All Saints Church in Brougham Street.

The nearest Roman Catholic church is the Catholic Church of the Sacred Heart, served by the Society of Jesus, in Lauriston Street, just beyond Tollcross in the neighbouring district of Lauriston. A convent of the Little Sisters of the Poor in Gilmore Place incorporates a care home.

== Transport and industry ==
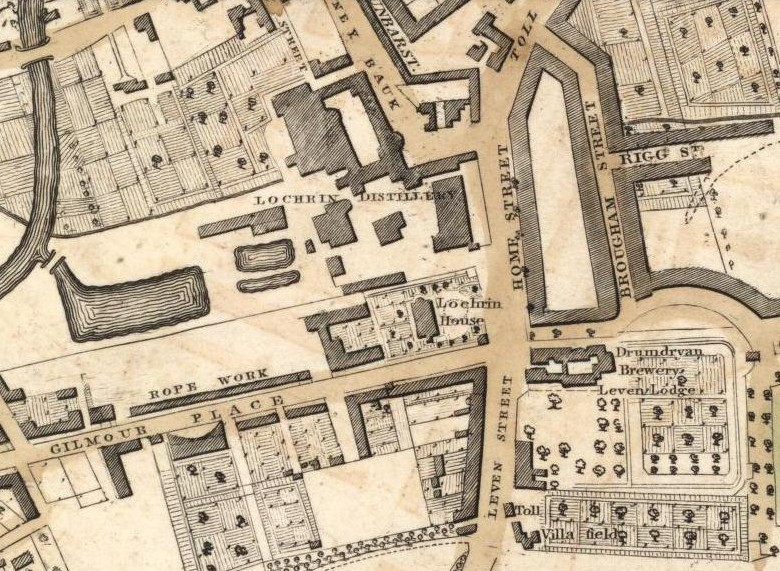
The Lochrin area in 1831, showing the brewery, distillery, canal basin, ropeworks and toll (lower right)

Tollcross, like neighbouring Fountainbridge, was important to the city's industry in the 19th century after the nearby Union Canal, completed in 1822, stimulated economic growth in the surrounding area. The tenement block called Lochrin Buildings perpetuates the name of the small Lochrin Burn (Scots for stream) which ran from the Burgh Loch in the Meadows to the Water of Leith at Roseburn. The site was formerly occupied by Lochrin House and the Lochrin Distillery which was replaced in 1859 by the Lochrin Iron Works, both benefiting from being situated directly beside one of the canal basins. Like the distillery, the Drumdryan Brewery, which stood on the site now occupied by the King's Theatre (1906), drew water from the burn which, now culverted, still flows under the building. There was also a saw mill, paraffin works, and municipal slaughterhouse in West Tollcross. In 1899 the tram depot and power station for the southern section of Edinburgh's large cable tramway system (later electric) opened here. After the last tram ran in 1956 it became a bus garage. This was demolished in 1986 to make way for a new fire station which replaced the central fire station in Lauriston Place; the building was Category B listed in 2023.

The area is well served by Lothian Buses, route numbers 10, 11, 15, 16, 23, 24, 27 & 45.

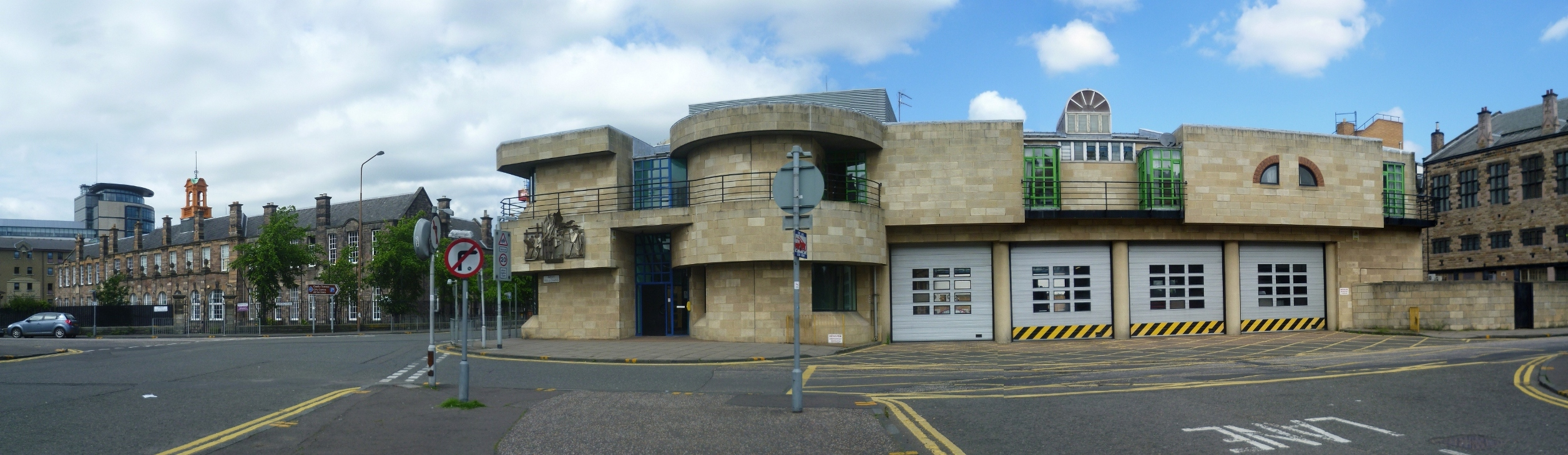
Tollcross Primary School and Fire Station

== Notable residents ==
- Angus Calder
