= Leamington Lift Bridge =

Bridge in Edinburgh, Scotland

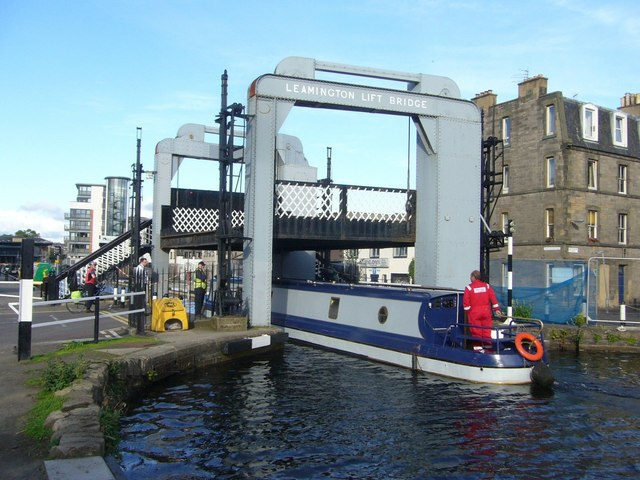
- The bridge raised to allow a boat to pass
- Coordinates: 55.941309°N 3.211048°W
- Crosses: Union Canal
- Locale: Edinburgh

Characteristics
- Design: Lift bridge
- Material: Steel
- No. of spans: 1

History
- Designer: Armstrong Whitworth
- Built: 1906

Location
- Interactive map of Leamington Lift Bridge

The Leamington Lift Bridge is a lift bridge that crosses the Union Canal near its terminus at Lochrin Basin in Edinburgh.

== History ==
The bridge was installed around 1906 where Fountainbridge crossed the canal replacing a previous bridge built in 1869. When the canal was shortened in 1922 to make Lochrin Basin the terminus it was moved to its present site to replace a wooden drawbridge. It fell out of use by the 1960s, but as part of the Millennium Link project to restore the Union Canal, it required to be restored at least to allow boats to pass. A report published in the year 2000 had suggested fixing it permanently open, but the decision was taken to restore it to full working order.

The restoration involved removing the deck and the top member of the bridge to access the inner workings. It opened for the first time on 16 May 2002, followed by an official opening ceremony on 24 May. An inspection in 2018 found the bridge to be unsafe, and in December that year it received £350,000 of Scottish Government funding, awarded through Sustrans Scotland's National Cycle Network Development Programme, for repairs. The work, which included upgrading the lifting mechanism, began in March 2019 and was completed in July 2019.

In July 2021, a Red Wheel plaque was unveiled at the bridge. Red Wheel plaques are installed by the National Transport Trust to identify sites of significant transport heritage. The one at the bridge is the first to be awarded on a Scottish canal.

== Design ==
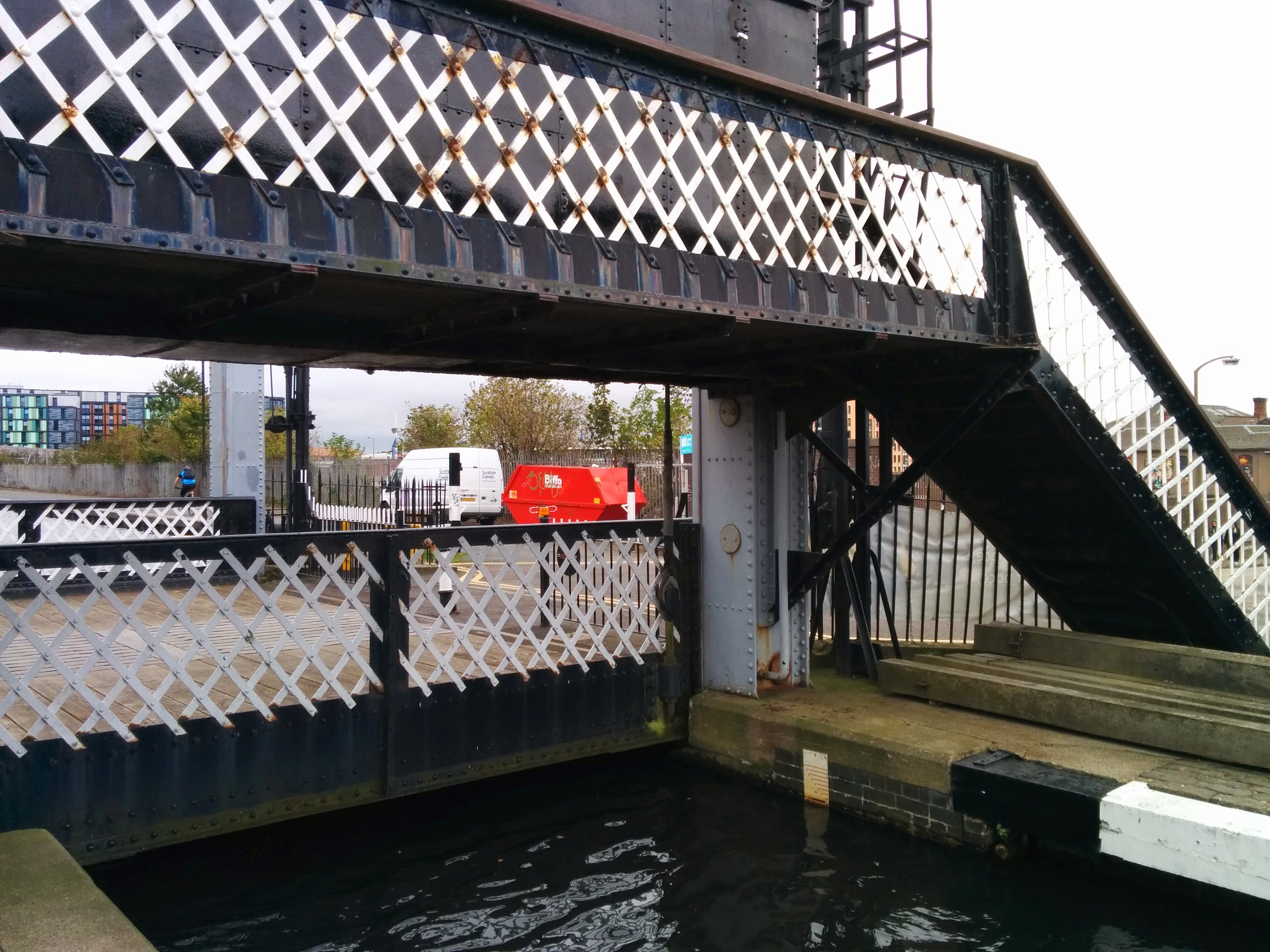
The permanent footbridge

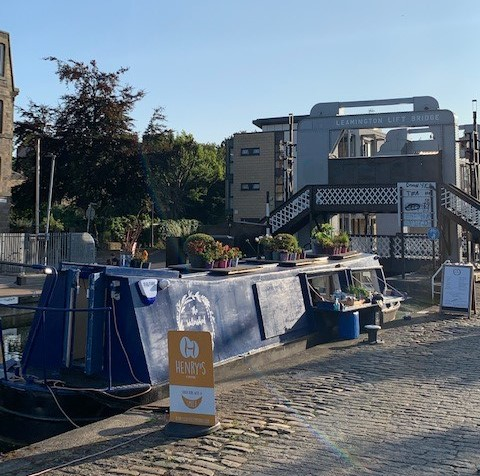
Boat cafe by the bridge 2021

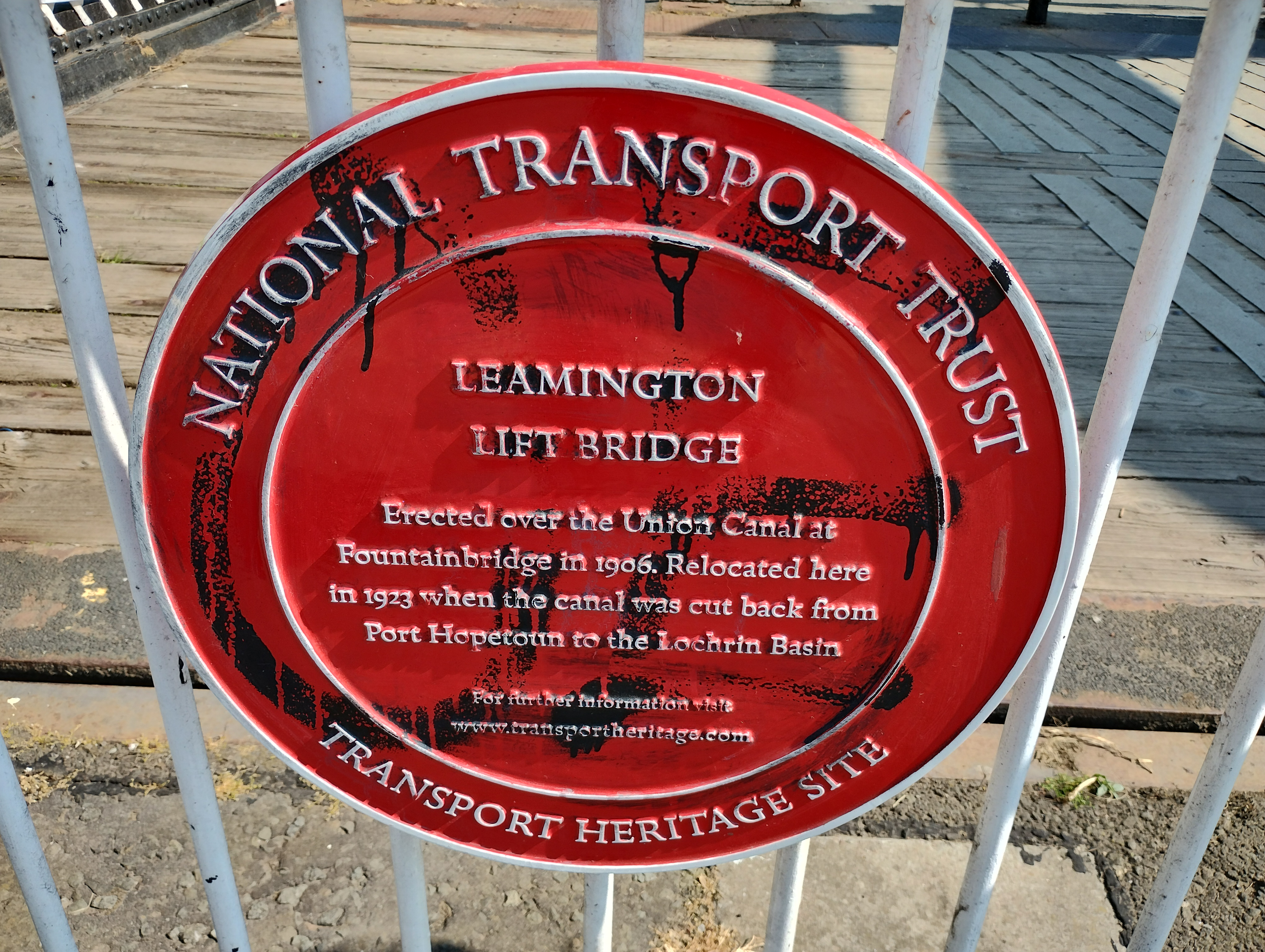
A photograph of a "Red Wheel" National Transport Trust plaque on the Leamington Lift Bridge

The bridge is constructed from a wooden deck that can be raised between two gantries to give a clearance of 9 feet (2.7 m) below. The bridge crosses between Gilmore Park and Leamington Road, but is not open to cars. A permanent lattice girder footbridge allows pedestrians to cross when the deck is raised.

It is formed from riveted steel, with more substantial columns on the southern side where the motors and counterbalances are housed.

The bridge can be opened by canal users after appropriate training from Scottish Canals. It is only the width of a single canal boat.

== See also ==
- List of bridges in Scotland
