= Forth Canoe Club =

Water sports club in Edinburgh, Scotland

Forth Canoe CLub
- Motto: per ventus et per artus
- Location: Edinburgh, Scotland
- Home water: Union Canal, Edinburgh
- Founded: 1934
- Colours: Blue, Yellow
- Affiliations: Scottish Canoe Association
- Website: forthcanoeclub.co.uk

Distinctions
- Oldest Canoe Club in Scotland

Notable members
- David Florence

The Forth Canoe Club, founded in 1934, is Scotland's oldest surviving canoe club. It is the only remaining club to have been a participating party in the founding of the Scottish Canoe Association. The other canoe clubs that were founding parties where Clyde, Tay and the Scottish Youth Hostellers.

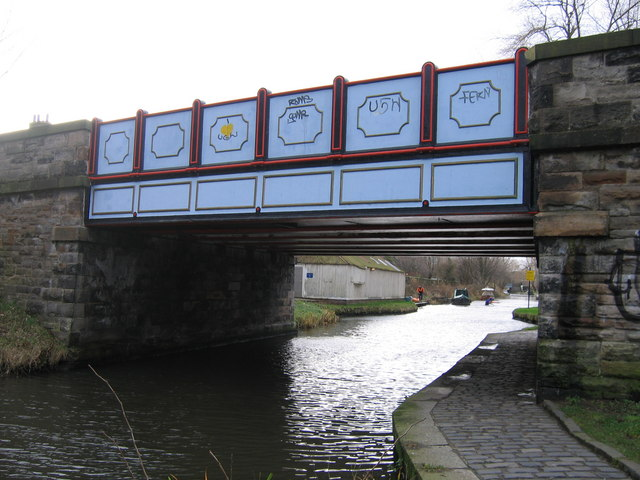
Forth Canoe Club seen through Harrison Road bridge

The club's motto, per ventus et per artus means "by wind and by skill".

The first commodore of Forth Canoe Club was Lady Mearns and the subsequent commodore was Jack Cuthill. The club was based around the old primary school in Granton ran by Jack Cuthill which became the Compass Adventure Centre for Sailors and Soldiers during the war where those of military service could meet and go canoeing.

In 1968(ish) it moved to the Lochrin Basin at the Edinburgh end of the Union Canal following a fire that broke out in the original clubhouse down at the harbour. The fire was labelled accidental, however the club were disappointed to see their return to the Harbor was unlikely as significant redevelopment in Granton followed the clubs relocation. The Lochrin basin became the new home of the club and its 4 sheds were used for the activities from boat storage, repair and manufacture. Forth Canoe Club became the birthplace of the company Double Dutch founded by Neil Baxter one of the clubs active members. One of the buildings at the Lochrin basin was named in memory of Jack Cuthill.

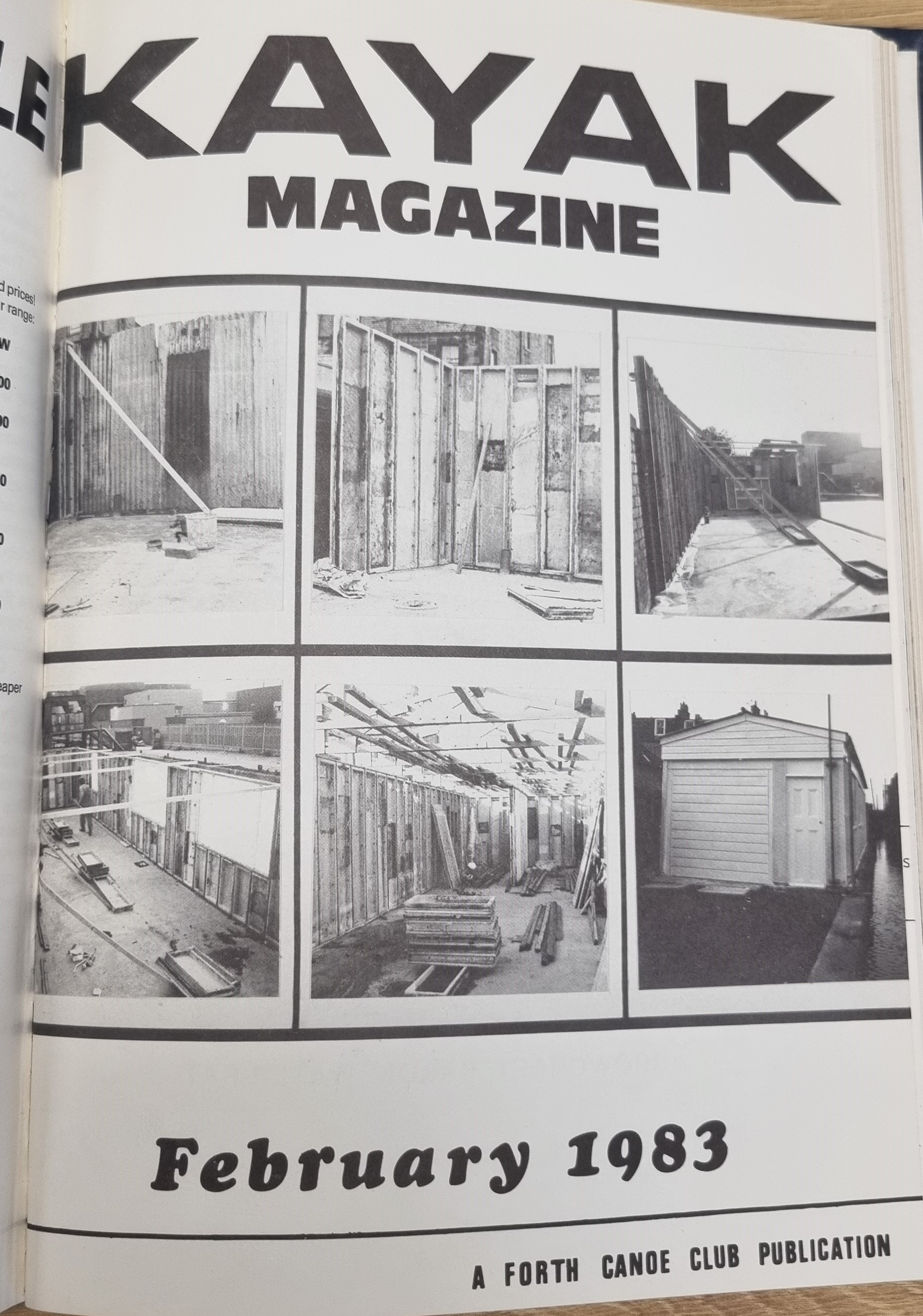

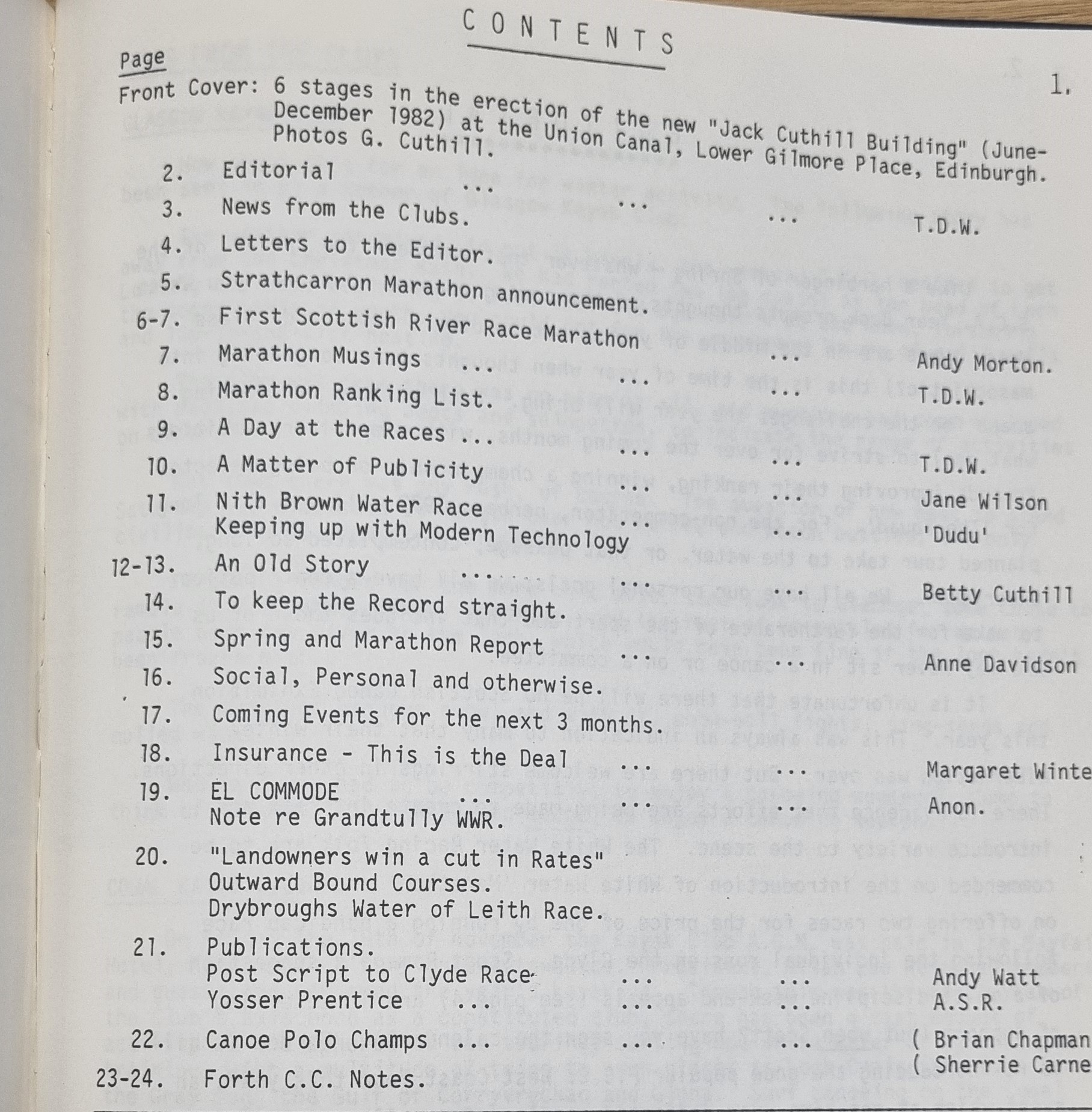

In 1975, extensive dredging was required as most of the union canal had become unusable due to the incredibly shallow water and deep mud. In part due to the Collapse of the mines under the canal at Lock Gate 19 now formally the Falkirk Wheel. The club's Secretary, R.K Riddell at the time lead an entirely volunteer based dredging action in the Lochrin basin. Their willingness to re-spark the use of the canal became quite renown and as such over the course of the next 25 years thousands of volunteers joined in the effort clearing the canal from Edinburgh to Glasgow by hand, shovel and spade. The effort eventually resulted in a National Lottery (United Kingdom) Grant of £80 million to clear the Canal from Bowling to Falkirk

When the Union Canal was undergoing substantial redevelopment by British Waterways as part of the Millennium Link, Forth Canoe Club were required to relocate from the 4 buildings it owned beside the Lochrin basin in 2004, they were moved to the Old St Andrew's Boathouse further along the canal adjacent to Harrison Park shrinking the clubs operational capacity by 3/4.

Forth Canoe Club member David Florence represented Great Britain at the 2008 Summer Olympics as a member of the senior team. At the 2008 Summer Olympics in Beijing he won a silver medal in the men's C1 single slalom event on 12 August 2008.

In 2024 the club celebrated its 90th anniversary by announcing its plans at a Fundraising Ceilidh at The Canalside venue, Meggetland to redevelop its clubhouse at Harrison park due to its age and the hostility of the site to a sport which could attract many people regardless of physical ability.
