= Union Canal (Scotland) =

Canal in Scotland, running from Falkirk to Edinburgh

Coordinates: 55°56′33.24″N 3°12′29.29″W

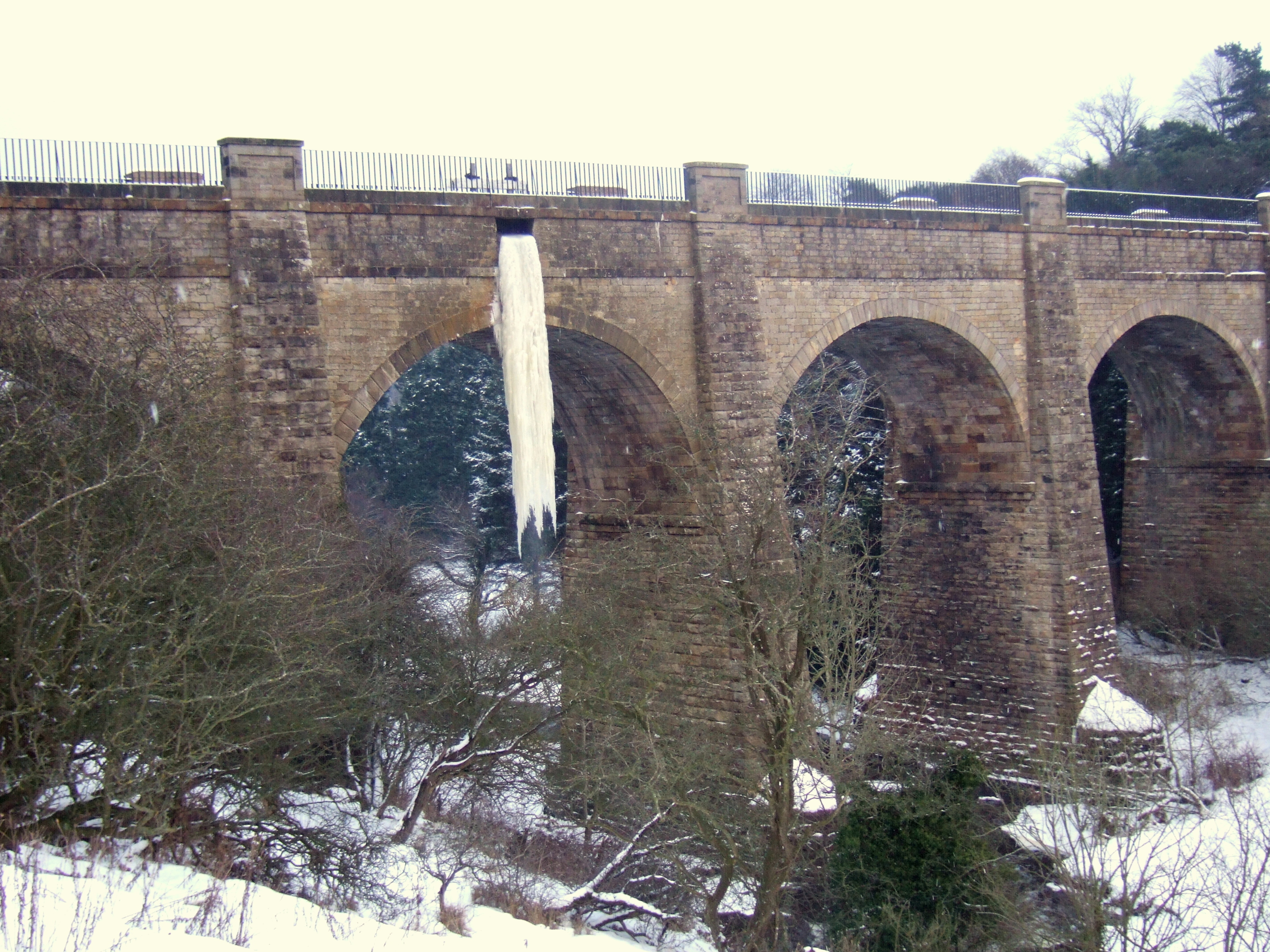
Frozen overflow channel at the River Almond aqueduct during the big freeze of 2010

The Union Canal, originally called Edinburgh and Glasgow Union Canal, is a canal in Scotland, running from Falkirk to Edinburgh, constructed to bring minerals, especially coal, to the capital. It was opened in 1822 and was initially successful, but the construction of railways, particularly the Edinburgh and Glasgow Railway, which opened in 1842, diminished its value as a transport medium. It fell into slow commercial decline and was closed to commercial traffic in 1933. It was officially closed in 1965. The canal is listed as three individual scheduled monuments by Historic Scotland according to the three former counties, Midlothian, West Lothian and Stirlingshire, through which it flows.

It has benefited from a general revival of interest in canals and, as a result of the Millennium Link, was reopened in 2001 and reconnected to the Forth and Clyde Canal in 2002 by the Falkirk Wheel. It is now in popular use for leisure purposes.

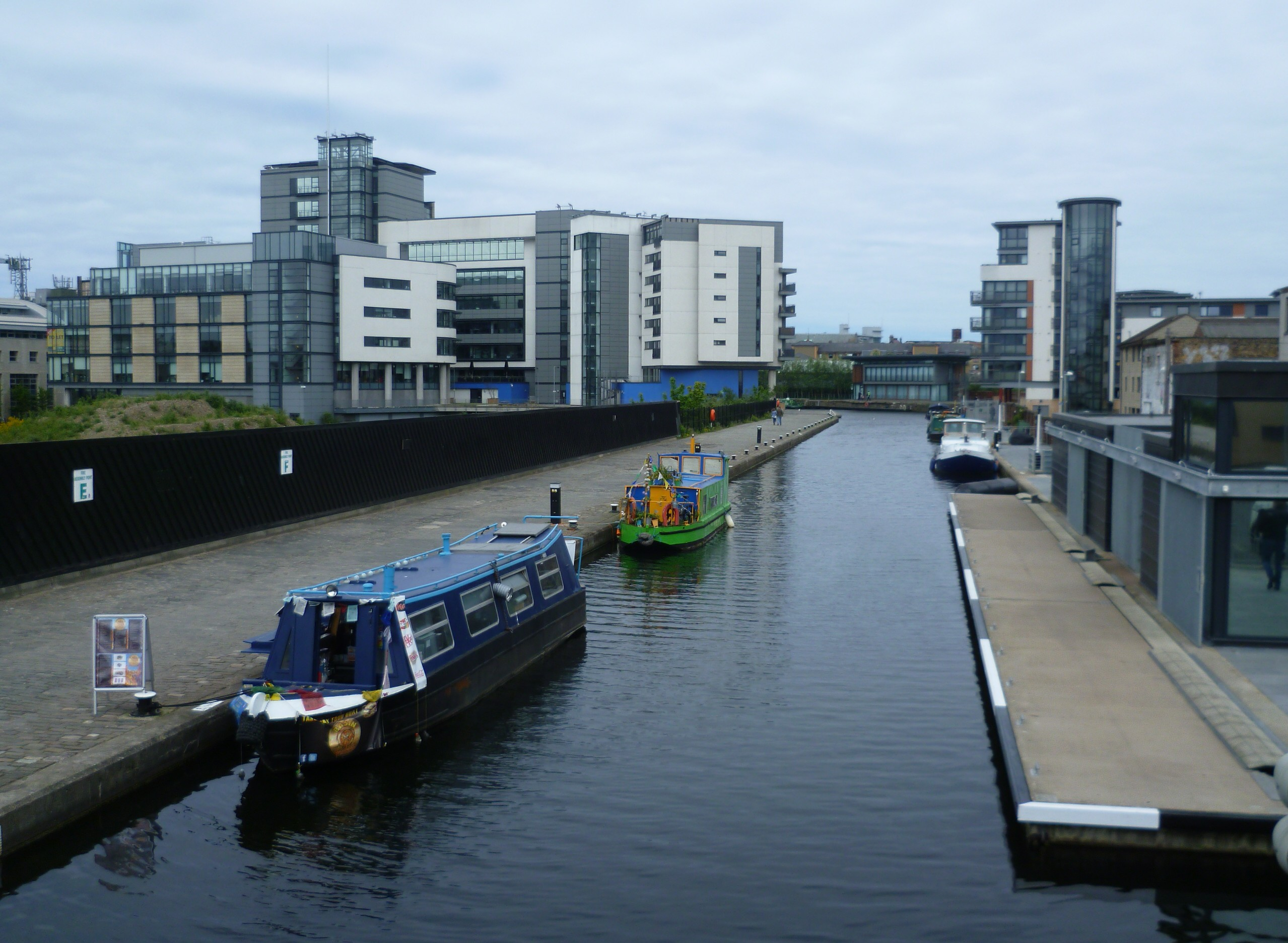
The eastern terminus at Edinburgh Quay

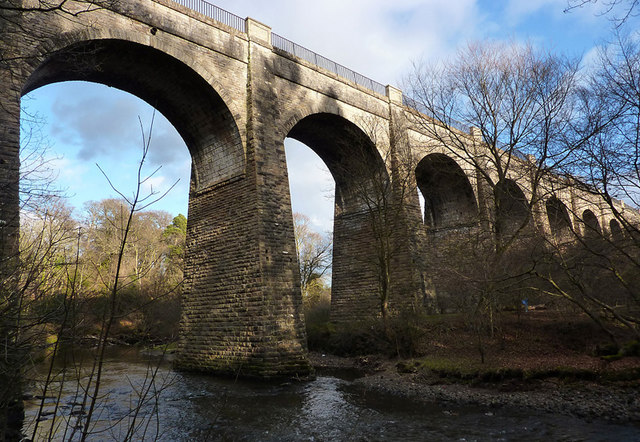
Avon Aqueduct

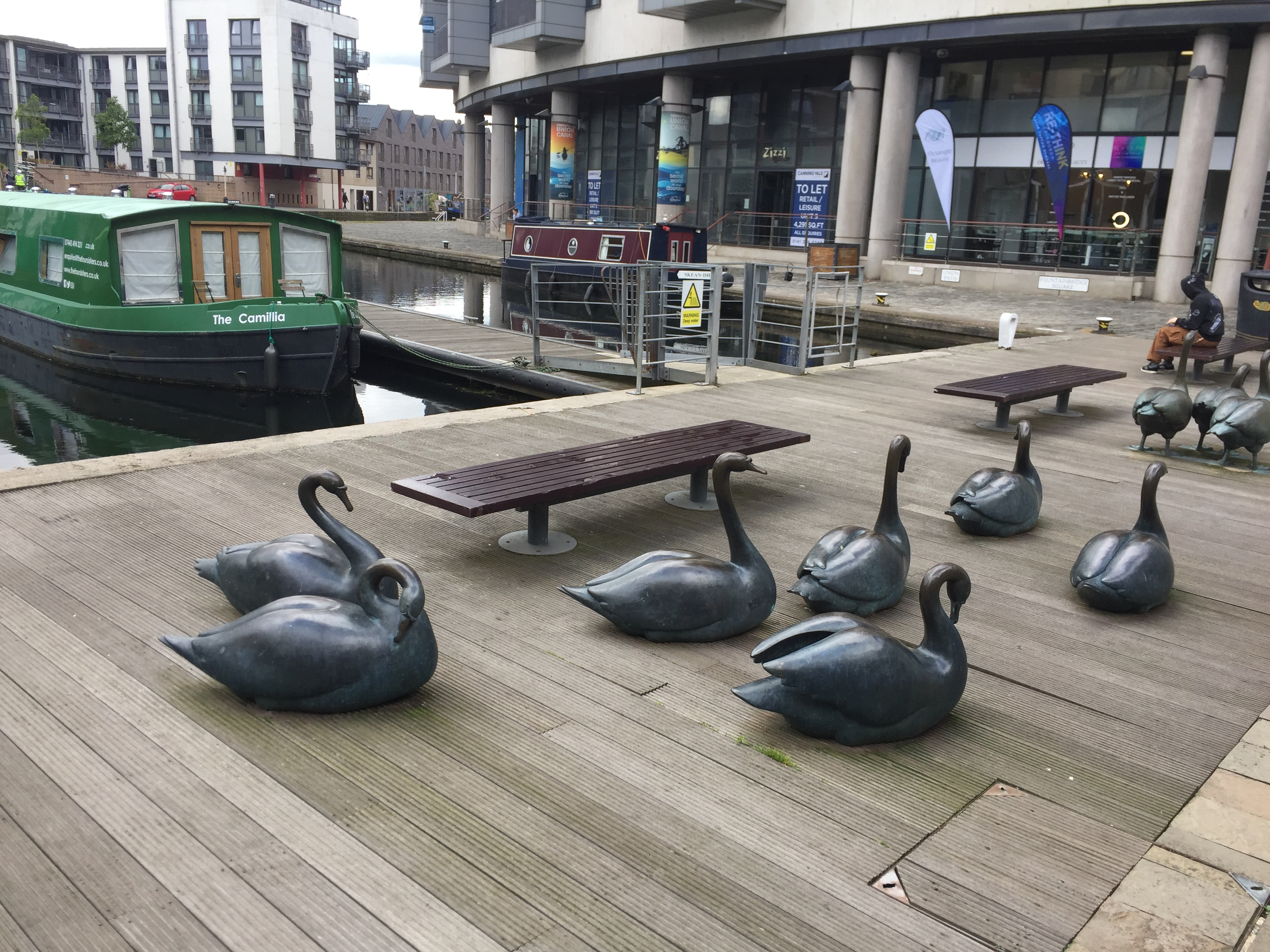
Union Canal statues, Edinburgh June 2024

== History ==
=== Proposal ===
The canal was conceived with the purpose of moving minerals from the mines and quarries in Lanarkshire to Edinburgh.

Edinburgh and Glasgow Union Canal Company Act 1817
- Act of Parliament
- Parliament of the United Kingdom
- Long title: An Act for making and maintaining a Navigable Canal from the Lothian Road, near the City of Edinburgh, to join the Forth and Clyde Navigation near Falkirk, in the County of Stirling.
- Citation: 57 Geo. 3. c. lvi

Dates
- Royal assent: 27 June 1817

Text of statute as originally enacted

In 1817, the Edinburgh and Glasgow Union Canal Company obtained a local act of Parliament, the Edinburgh and Glasgow Union Canal Company Act 1817 (57 Geo. 3. c. lvi) to start construction. Joseph Priestley described the purpose of the canal in his 1831 book Historical Account of the Navigable Rivers, Canals and Railways of Great Britain:

The primary object of this navigation was to effect an inland communication between the cities of Edinburgh and Glasgow; to the former of which it must be essentially serviceable, in consequence of the increased facilities afforded to the transit of lime, coal, stone, &c. which abound in its course. This undertaking was designed by Mr. Thomas Telford and Mr. Baird, who estimated the cost at £240,468, 17s. 2d.; of which sum £198,650 was subscribed before going to parliament. The first act of parliament ... is entitled, 'An Act for making and maintaining a navigable Canal from the Lothian Road, near the city of Edinburgh, to join the Forth and Clyde Navigation near Falkirk, in the county of Stirling.' The company of proprietors consisted, at the time the first act was obtained, of three hundred and eighty-four persons, amongst whom were the Lord Provost of Edinburgh, Sir William Forbes, Sir John Hay, and Sir John Marjoribanks, who were incorporated by the name of "The Edinburgh and Glasgow Union Canal Company," with power to raise £240,500, in four thousand eight hundred and ten shares, of £50 each, and a further sum of £50,000, either among themselves, by the admission of new subscribers, or on mortgage of the undertaking.

Edinburgh and Glasgow Union Canal Act 1819
- Act of Parliament
- Parliament of the United Kingdom
- Long title: An Act for altering and amending an Act for making and maintaining a Navigable Canal from the Lothian Road near the City of Edinburgh, to join the Forth and Clyde Navigation near Falkirk, in the County of Stirling.
- Citation: 59 Geo. 3. c. xxix

Dates
- Royal assent: 19 May 1819

Text of statute as originally enacted

Edinburgh and Glasgow Union Canal Act 1821
- Act of Parliament
- Parliament of the United Kingdom
- Long title: An Act for amending certain Acts for making and maintaining Navigable Canal from the Lothian Road, near the City of Edinburgh, to join the Forth and Clyde Navigation near Falkirk, in the County of Stirling; and giving Power to borrow a further Sum of Money on the Credit of the Tolls granted by the said Acts.
- Citation: 1 & 2 Geo. 4. c. cxxii

Dates
- Royal assent: 23 June 1821

Edinburgh and Glasgow Union Canal Company Act 1823
- Act of Parliament
- Parliament of the United Kingdom
- Long title: An Act to enable the Edinburgh and Glasgow Union Canal Company to borrow a further Sum of Money.
- Citation: 4 Geo. 4. c. xviii

Dates
- Royal assent: 12 May 1823

Text of statute as originally enacted

Edinburgh and Glasgow Union Canal Act 1826
- Act of Parliament
- Parliament of the United Kingdom
- Long title: An Act to alter and amend the Edinburgh and Glasgow Union Canal Acts, and to enable the Company to borrow a further Sum of Money.
- Citation: 7 Geo. 4. c. xlv

Dates
- Royal assent: 5 May 1826

The estimate of cost was evidently inadequate because a second act of Parliament was obtained, the Edinburgh and Glasgow Union Canal Act 1819 (59 Geo. 3. c. xxix), which authorised the borrowing of £48,100, a third, the Edinburgh and Glasgow Union Canal Act 1821 (1 & 2 Geo. 4. c. cxxii) authorised an increase in share capital of a further £50,000 and a fourth, the Edinburgh and Glasgow Union Canal Company Act 1823 (4 Geo. 4. c. xviii) authorised a further £60,000.

However, when the Union Canal got its act of Parliament, the town of Linlithgow, along with Edinburgh, mounted a legal petition for compensation for any losses they would incur from the turnpike that ran between Glasgow and Edinburgh. Their writ read:

The Company are directed to indemnify the Magistrates and Town Council of the Royal Burgh of Linlithgow for any Diminution of the Customs upon Cattle, Carriages, or Goods carried over the Avon at Torphichan Mill; also to secure to the Magistrates and Town Council of the City of Edinburgh the Rate of One Penny per Ton on all Goods, Wares, or other Things (except Manure,) shipped or unloaded at any of the Wharfs and Basins, in lieu of certain Rates, Dues, Causeway, Mail, and Petty Customs, which they are now entitled to; as it appears that, by a Charter or Gift of Charles the First, dated 17 May 1636, the Ministers of Edinburgh are entitled to a Duty or Custom of Thirteen Shillings and Four-pence Scots, upon each Ton or Pack of Goods imported to Edinburgh, Leith, or Newhaven. The Company are therefore directed to pay the same on all Goods which may be imported by this Navigation. They are also bound to indemnify the Edinburgh Road Trustees, the Bathgate, and another Trust, in any Diminution of Tolls arising from these Turnpike Roads, which may be affected by their Canal.

=== Construction and design ===
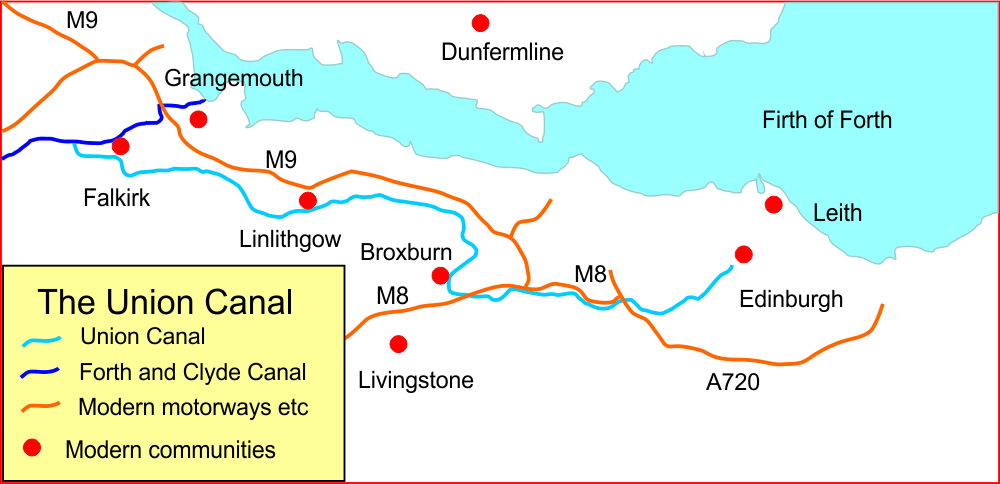
Map of the Union Canal

The Union Canal, which has a length of 31 miles (50 km) today, was built as a contour canal. This avoided building costs and future operational delays caused by the provision of locks but necessitated large aqueducts to cross river valleys. The canal operated between a junction with the Forth and Clyde Canal at Falkirk and Port Hopetoun basin in the centre of Edinburgh. The waterway, which was originally 32 miles (51 km), follows a contour of 73 m (240 feet) above sea level throughout its entire length. Port Hopetoun was a basin between Semple Street and Lothian Road, and Morrison Street and Fountainbridge. However, the final mile has been filled in and the Edinburgh terminal is now at Lochrin Basin in Tollcross, adjacent to Fountainbridge.

The canal has several navigable aqueducts, including the Slateford Aqueduct that takes the canal over the Water of Leith in Edinburgh, the Almond Aqueduct near Ratho and the 810-foot-long (250 m) Avon Aqueduct near Linlithgow, the second-longest in the United Kingdom. Priestley describes the route and structures in some detail:

[The] Canal commences from the sixteenth lock of the Forth and Clyde Navigation, about two miles west of Falkirk, in the county of Sterling [sic], whence it takes an eastwardly course on the south side of the above-mentioned town, by some collieries; thence, through Black Hill Tunnel, and across the Glen Water, on which stream, at a short distance to the southward, is constructed a considerable reservoir. Its line hence is by Brighton Freestone Quarries, and about a mile [1.6 km] north from Park Hill Colliery, to the Avon River, over which there is an aqueduct conveying the canal at an elevation of 80 feet [24 m] above the surface of the river. The canal here enters the county of Linlithgow, and passes within a mile and a half [2.4 km] on the south side of its capital, to Craighton House, where its course is more southerly and circuitous, to the River Almond, near Clifton House, where it crosses into Edinburghshire, by means of an aqueduct. Its course hence is by Ratho House, and across Leith River, to the city of Edinburgh, where it terminates by a basin at the Lothian Road, about half a mile [0.8 km] south-west of the castle. The length of the canal is thirty miles [48 km], the depth of water 5 feet [1.5 m], and is on one level from Edinburgh to its western extremity, where it falls 110 feet [34 m], in one series of locks, into the Forth and Clyde Canal.

Many of the stone bridges have keystones on which is engraved the number of the bridge: the keystones of Viewforth bridge, the second bridge from the start of the canal at Edinburgh Quay, are emblazoned with the coats of arms of Glasgow and Edinburgh, facing west and east respectively.

The income from the project was derived from tolls, and charges for wharfage and so on. Maximum prices for these were laid down in the act of Parliament. The tolls were based on tonnage of the merchandise being conveyed; there was a toll for empty vessels, and this was to be remitted if the vessel returned laden within fourteen days.

=== Closure and demise ===
Edinburgh and Glasgow Railway and Edinburgh and Glasgow Union Canal Amalgamation Act 1849
- Act of Parliament
- Parliament of the United Kingdom
- Long title: An Act for vesting the Edinburgh and Glasgow Union Canal in the Edinburgh and Glasgow Railway Company.
- Citation: 12 & 13 Vict. c. xxxix

Dates
- Royal assent: 26 June 1849

Text of statute as originally enacted

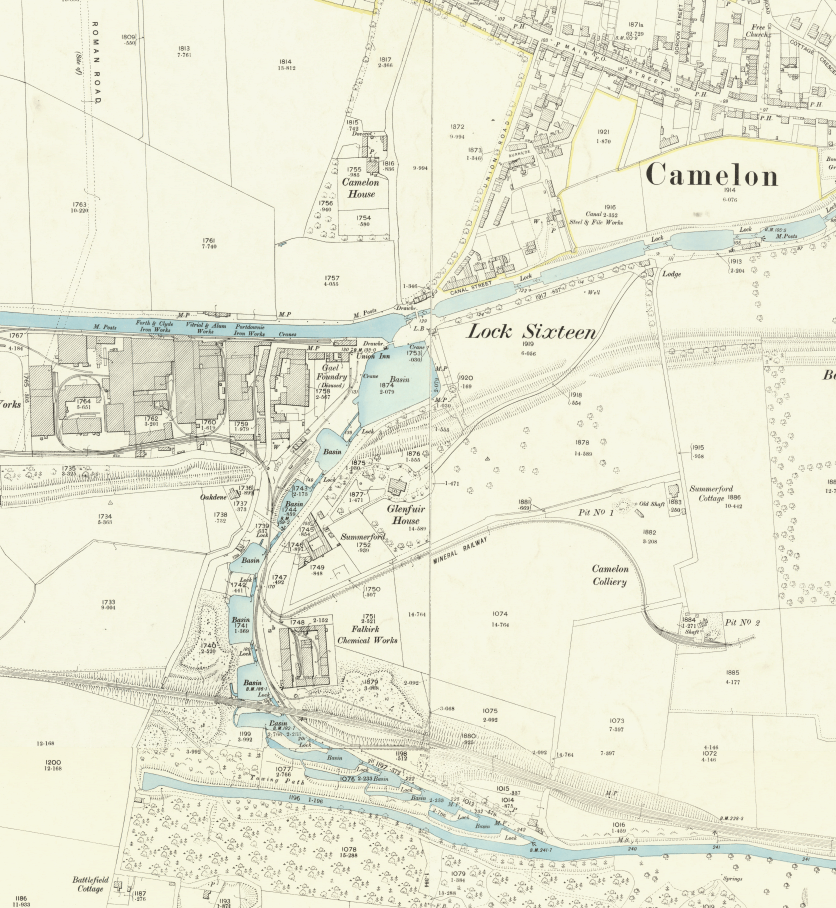
Flight of locks at Falkirk on an old map

In 1842 the Edinburgh and Glasgow Railway opened taking much of the traffic away from the canal with passenger traffic effectively disappearing. Although the waterway was still used to transport industrial minerals to Edinburgh, goods requiring more haste were put on to trains. The canal was acquired by the E&GR in 1849 under the Edinburgh and Glasgow Railway and Edinburgh and Glasgow Union Canal Amalgamation Act 1849 (12 & 13 Vict. c. xxxix). Industrial traffic continued to use the waterway until after the First World War. However, with the closure of Port Hamilton and Port Hopetoun (the main basins in Edinburgh) in 1921, commercial traffic steadily declined with the western terminal closing in 1933. The canal continued to decline across the next three decades, with the abandoned flight of 11 locks at Falkirk, which connected the Union to the Forth and Clyde, being filled in. The canal was culverted for the Wester Hailes housing development in the western outskirts of Edinburgh and for the M8 motorway near Broxburn. Formal closure to navigation came in 1965 and throughout the 1970s and 1980s the remaining parts of the canal were left in a deteriorated state.

However, after a campaign was started by groups and local communities to improve the canal, work was carried out to restore the network during the 1990s. This culminated with the millennium project to reinstate the link between the Union Canal to the Forth and Clyde Canal with a boat lift called the Falkirk Wheel.

== Archaeology ==
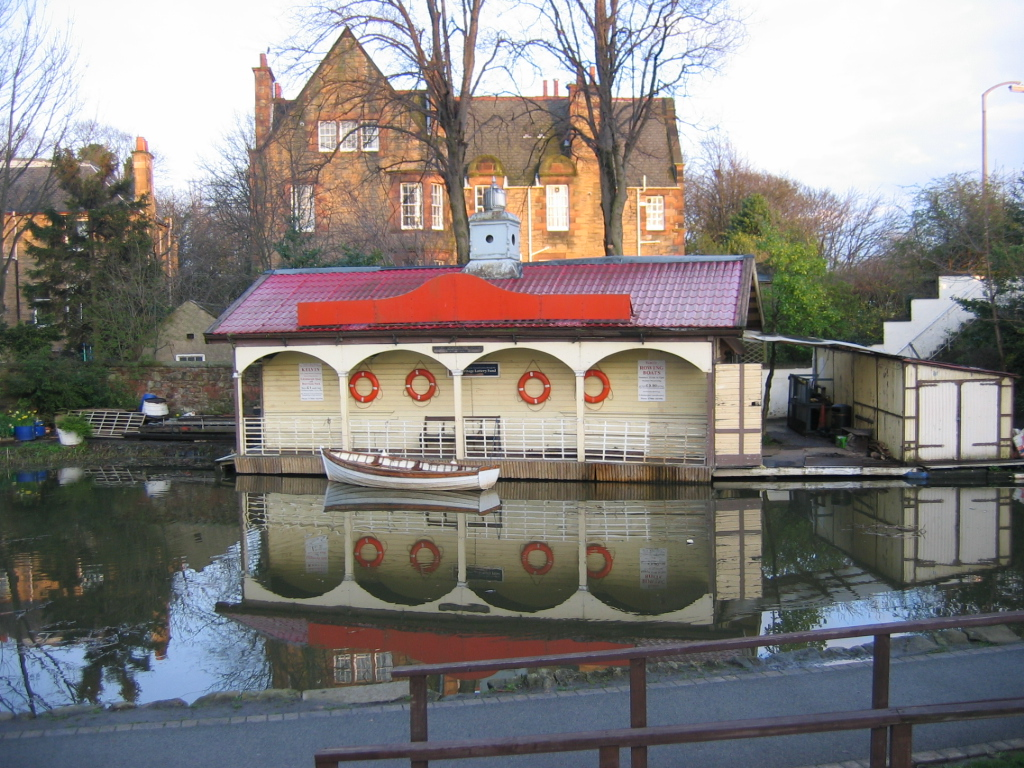
Boathouse where the canal passes near Shandon and Polwarth

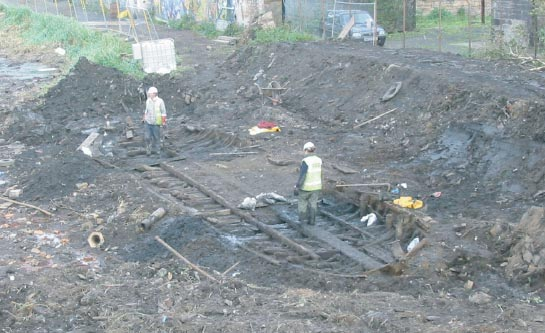
Wooden barge during excavation

In 2004, an archaeological investigation by a team from Headland Archaeology uncovered the stern of a 21-metre-long (69 ft) wooden barge. The vessel was discovered on the south bank of the canal between the Leamington Lift Bridge and Viewforth Bridge in Edinburgh. The remains represent the final berth of an early- to mid-19th-century canal barge or scow, a type of horse-drawn vessel that was the main freight carrier of the time. Typical cargoes included coal and lime from Lanarkshire, although there were a number of passenger carriers too; the actual function of this vessel is unknown. The vessel was dismantled and removed from the canal in order to record the techniques used in its construction. Additional work will seek to identify the species, age and provenance of the timbers.

== Millennium Link ==
The Millennium Link was a project to restore a link between the Union and Forth and Clyde Canals at the Falkirk end. In 2002 the Falkirk Wheel opened reestablishing this historic connection. The scheme involved building a new stretch of canal, single and double locks and a short tunnel under the Edinburgh–Glasgow railway line and the Antonine Wall. Several new bridges were also built on the Millennium Link. As no CAD information was available on narrowboats, the motion of articulated lorries were used to design the bends of the bridge approaches.

== Leisure uses ==
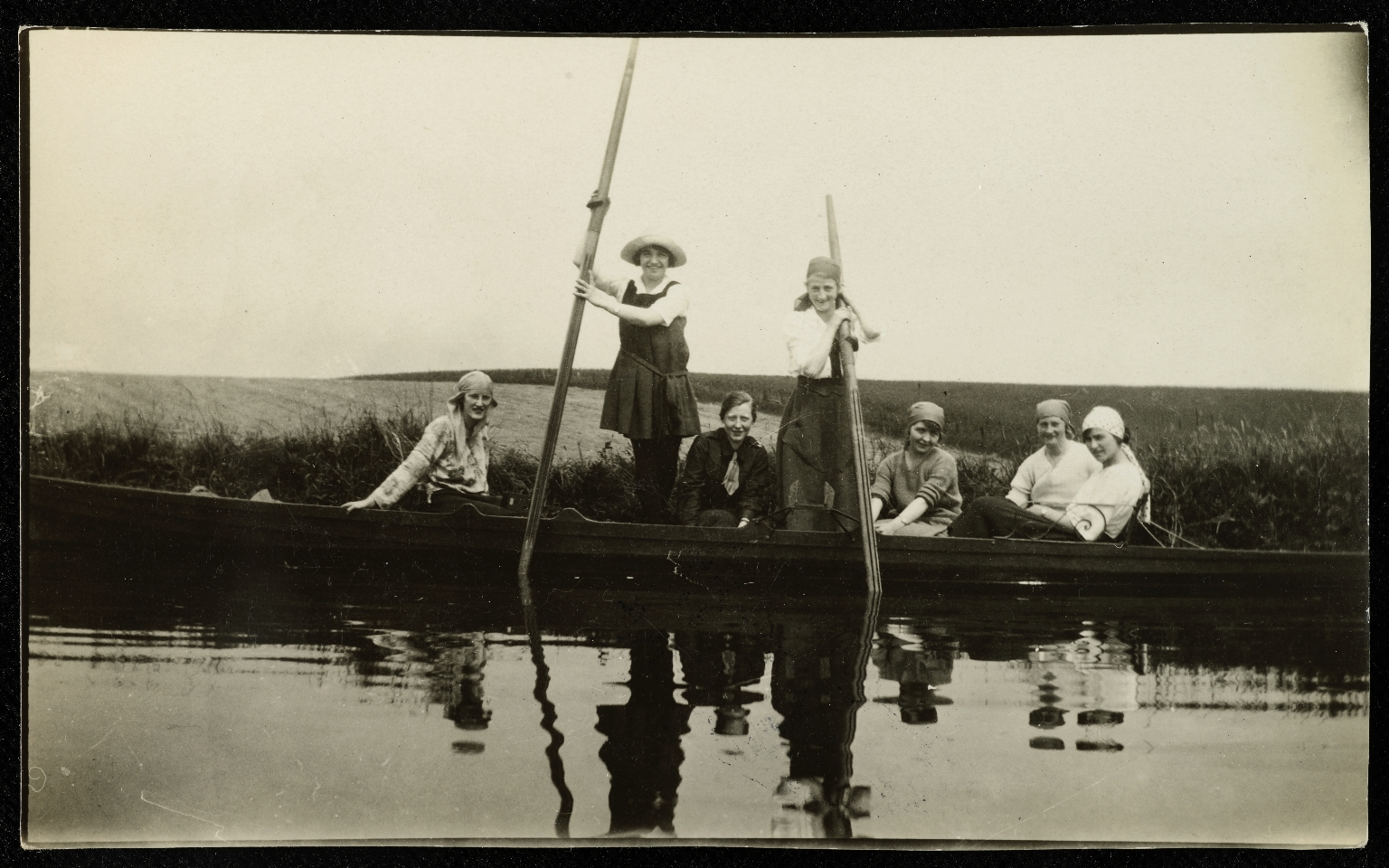
Students picnic on the Union Canal in 1922.

The canal is now used recreationally by canoeists at the Forth Canoe Club and rowers from schools and universities, such as St Andrew Boat Club, George Heriots School Rowing Club and George Watsons College Rowing Club. The Edinburgh Canal Society, the Bridge 19-40 Canal Society and Linlithgow Union Canal Society promote general use of the canal. They hire rowing boats and narrowboats, and they provide regular boat trips on the canal for the general public. Re-Union Canal Boats operate a social enterprise building and maintaining trip boats.

Scottish Canals (as successor to the British Waterways Board in Scotland) have redeveloped the area at the Edinburgh terminal; their publicity states:

Edinburgh Quay is a major regeneration project centred on the site of Lochrin Basin, in the heart of Scotland's capital. It provides around 90 waterfront apartments, 150,000 square feet (14,000 m^{2}) of offices and 55,000 square feet (5,100 m^{2}) of retail and restaurant space.

Raft races have become an annual event, having been held in Edinburgh from 2007 to 2011, and using found "junk" material for the rafts. The Linlithgow Union Canal Society has been hosting its cardboard boat race for many years at Linlithgow Basin.

== 2020 Canal Breach ==
In the early morning of Wednesday the 12th of August 2020, slow-moving thunderstorms caused torrential rain over much of eastern Scotland, including in the Falkirk area. This heavy rainfall caused the Union Canal to overtop its embankment east of Polmont, producing a 30 metre wide breach in the canal. The floodwaters released from the breach caused significant damage to the main railway line from Glasgow to Edinburgh via Falkirk High, Scotland's busiest railway line.

== See also ==
- Canals of the United Kingdom
- Falkirk Helix
- Falkirk Wheel
- Forth to Firth Canal Pathway
- History of the British canal system
- John Muir Way
- St Kentigern's Church, Edinburgh (Union Canal)
- History of the Union Canal, archived from www.scottishcanals.co.uk

== Bibliography ==
- Cadell, H.M. (1923). "Scottish canals and waterways". Scottish Geographical Magazine. 39 (2): 73–99. doi:10.1080/00369222308734363.
- Coleman, R (2004). Union Canal, Leamington Wharf. Discovery and Excavation in Scotland. p. 57.
- Lindsey, Jean (1968). The Canals of Scotland. David & Charles Publishers. ISBN 0-7153-4240-1.
- Massey, Alison (1983). The Edinburgh and Glasgow Union Canal. Falkirk Museums Publication. ISBN 0-906586-24-0.
- Paterson, Len (2005). From Sea To Sea: A History of the Scottish Lowland and Highland Canals. Glasgow: Neil Wilson Publishing. ISBN 1903238943.
- Priestley, Joseph (1831). Historical Account of the Navigable Rivers, Canals and Railways of Great Britain. London: Longman, Rees Orme, Brown and Green.
