= Fountainbridge =

Area of Edinburgh, Scotland

Coordinates: 55°56′37″N 3°12′32″W

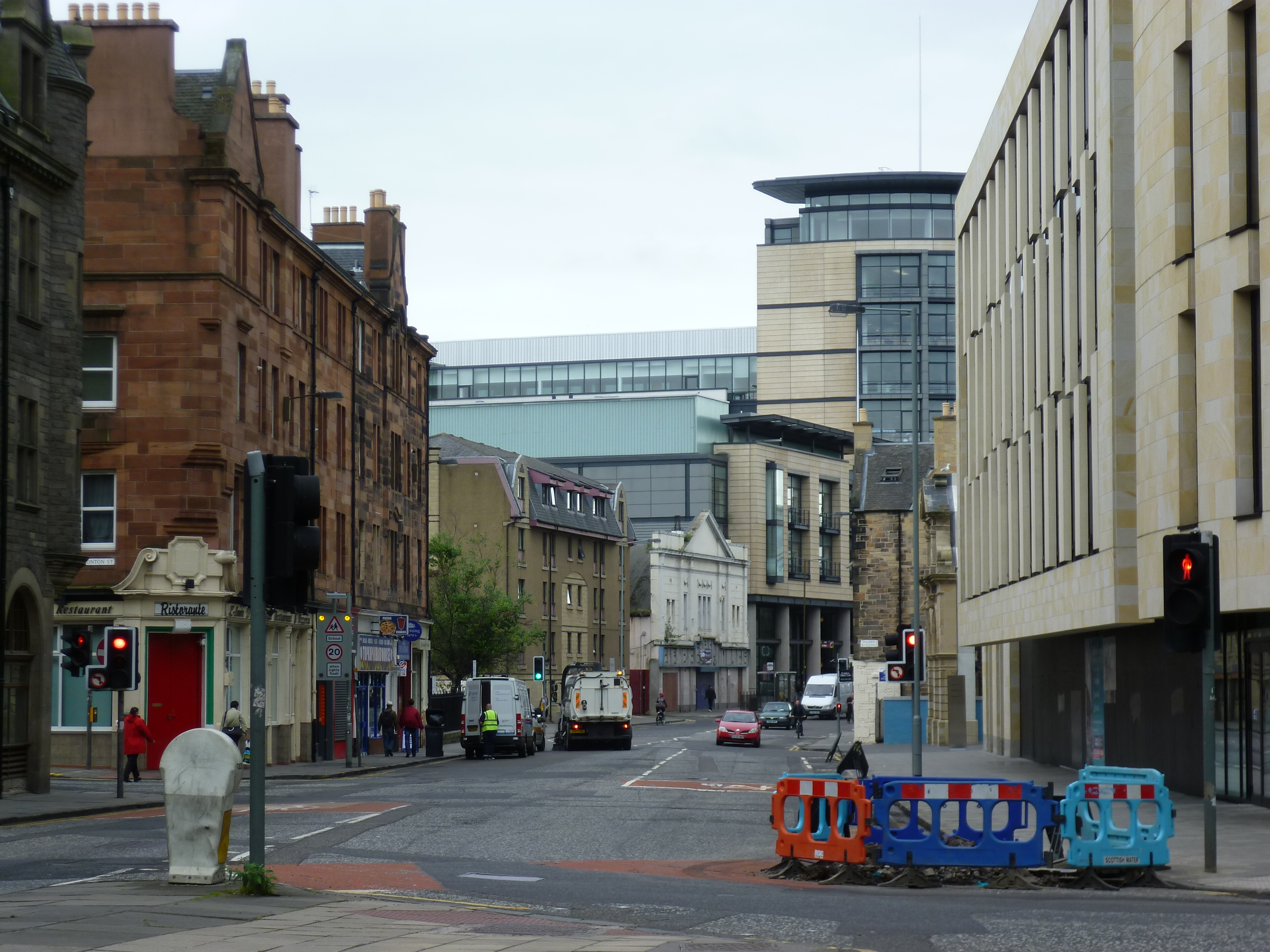
- Fountainbridge

- Location within the City of Edinburgh council area Location within Scotland
- OS grid reference: NT246729
- Council area: City of Edinburgh
- Lieutenancy area: Edinburgh
- Country: Scotland
- Sovereign state: United Kingdom
- Post town: EDINBURGH
- Postcode district: EH3
- Dialling code: 0131
- Police: Scotland
- Fire: Scottish
- Ambulance: Scottish
- UK Parliament: Edinburgh South West
- Scottish Parliament: Edinburgh Central

Fountainbridge is a former industrial district in Edinburgh, Scotland, a short distance west of the Old Town. It is built around the street of the same name, which begins at the West Port and continues (as Dundee Street) towards Gorgie and Dalry. The district is bounded on the south by the final stretch of the Union Canal and on the north by the West Approach Road, built on the route of the old Caledonian Railway.

== History ==
=== Early history ===
The Fountainbridge area first began to be developed at the beginning of the 18th century, when Alexander Brand bought the surrounding estate of Dalry and feued out land on the north side of the Lanark road for building. The name derives from a bridge that carried the road over the Dalry or Lochrin Burn. This had originally been called Foul Briggs or Foul Bridge, but Brand rechristened it "Fountainbridge" after a nearby well. The quiet and rural nature of Fountainbridge made it appealing to wealthier citizens who wanted to escape the cramped and insanitary Old Town, and it soon came to be "dotted over with pretentious and roomy mansions".

=== Industrialisation ===
The character of the district was to change in the 19th century, when it was transformed from a "secluded residential area for the middle classes" into the city's main industrial district. In 1822, it became the eastern terminus of the Union Canal, which ran from Edinburgh to Falkirk. The canal originally ended at the twin basins of Port Hopetoun and Port Hamilton, named after the canal company's principal backers. These were infilled in 1922, however, and the waterway now stops short at Lochrin Basin. The Leamington Lift Bridge, installed in 1906, stands at the entrance to the basin.

In 1856, the former Castle Silk Mills in Fountainbridge became the headquarters of the North British Rubber Company, manufacturers of Wellington boots and other rubber goods. The company was to become one of the biggest employers in the area over the ensuing century. During the Second World War, the rubber mills employed 9,000 workers and operated 24 hours a day. The company was bought out by Uniroyal in 1966, and the new owners began relocating operations to Newbridge on the outskirts of the city. The last facility at the Castle Mills site, a hose factory, closed in 1973.

Another major employer in Fountainbridge was McEwan's, which opened its Fountain Brewery here in 1856. By 1889, the site had grown to cover 12 acres (4.9 ha) and the company was valued at £1 million. McEwan's merged with Younger's to form Scottish Brewers in 1931, which in turn became the Scottish & Newcastle company in 1960. In 1973, the company invested £13 million in a state-of-the-art brewery at the old Castle Mills. The new brewery continued to operate until 2004.

By the mid-20th century, much of the housing stock in Fountainbridge and other working-class areas of the city had degraded into slums. Labour leader Harold Wilson visited the district in 1964 and expressed shock at the poor conditions in which residents were living. The Council responded to the problem by initiating a series of slum clearance programmes. Between 1950 and 1973, some 16,556 houses were closed or demolished and some 35,237 people were evicted across the city.

=== Redevelopment ===
Redevelopment of Fountainbridge began in 1998 with the construction of the Fountain Park leisure centre on former brewery ground on the north side of Dundee Street. This multi-purpose complex includes an adventure golf course, a laser tag arena, an amusement arcade, a multiplex cinema and ten-pin bowling, alongside multiple food outlets.

The Fountain Brewery site ceased operations in 2004 and was bought by the Council in 2012. The new Boroughmuir High School opened here in 2018. A remnant of the Castle Mills complex that the brewery had used as an office was leased to the Edinburgh Printmakers at a nominal rent. The building underwent an extensive renovation and opened in 2019 as a "multi-use arts complex centred around printmaking production". The rest of the site is earmarked for homes, offices, and shops.

Edinburgh Quay on the Union Canal is now the home of the annual Edinburgh Canal Festival. Scottish Canals offers long-term berths on the canal as part of its "Living on Water" programme.

== Demographics ==
Ethnicity	Fountainbridge/Craiglockhart	Edinburgh
White	83.4%	84.9%
Asian	10.8%	8.6%
Black	1.5%	2.1%
Mixed	1.9%	2.5%
Other	2.4%	1.9%

== Notable people ==
Sean Connery was born and grew up here. His former production company was known as Fountainbridge Films. Anti-slavery campaigner Frederick Douglass lived locally in Gilmore Place during his time in Scotland.

== Gallery ==
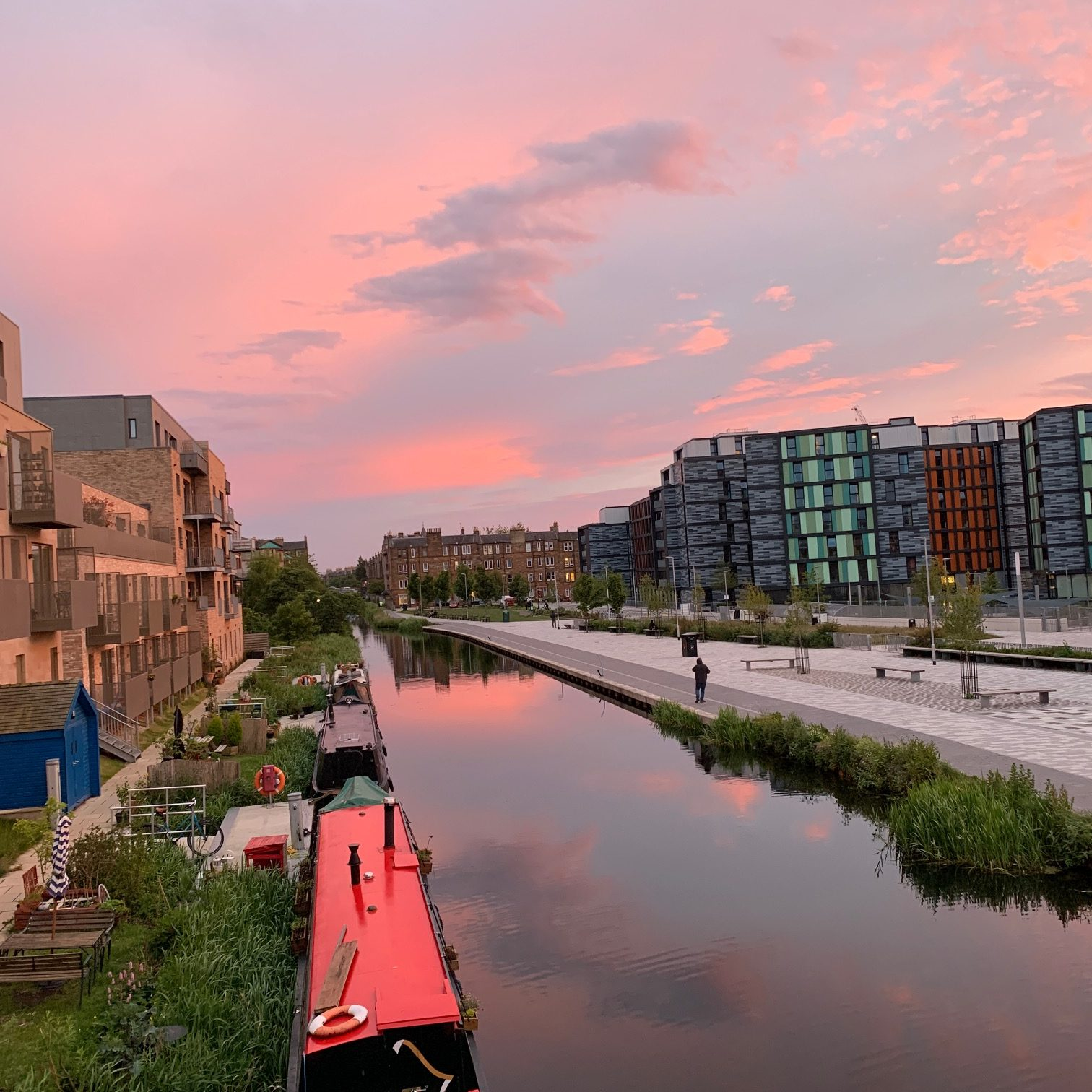
New student housing and public spaces by the canal

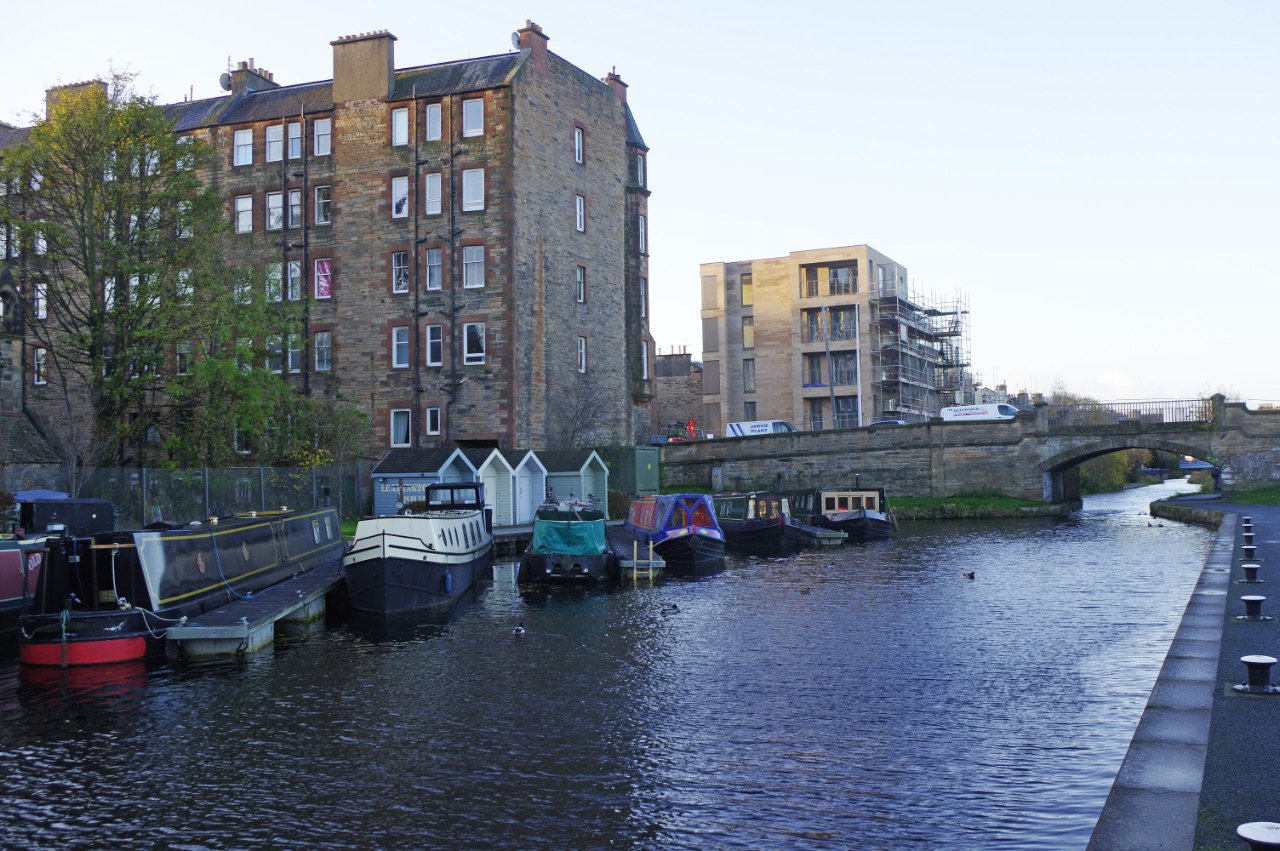
Houseboats on the canal

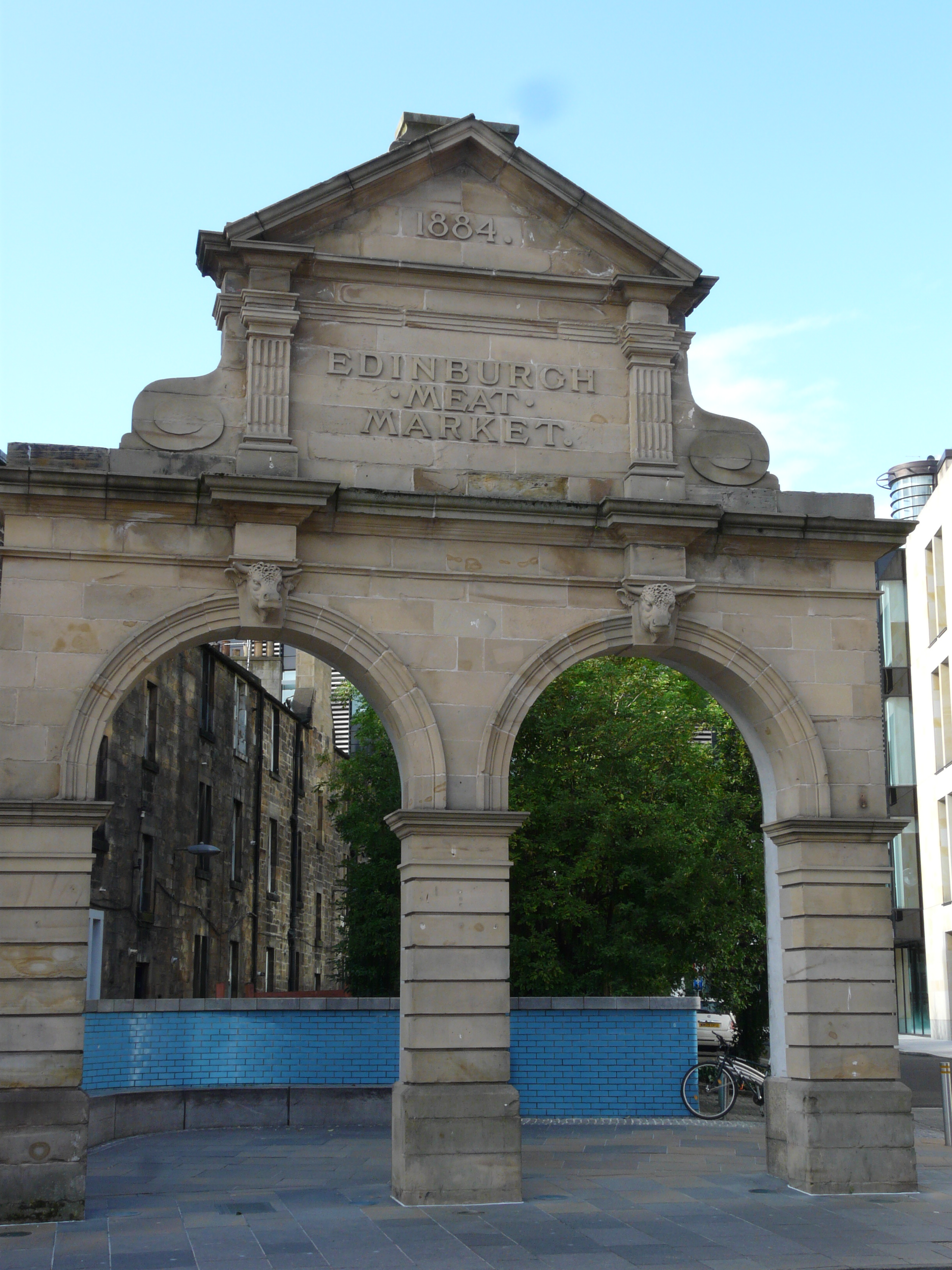
Former entrance to the Edinburgh Meat Market

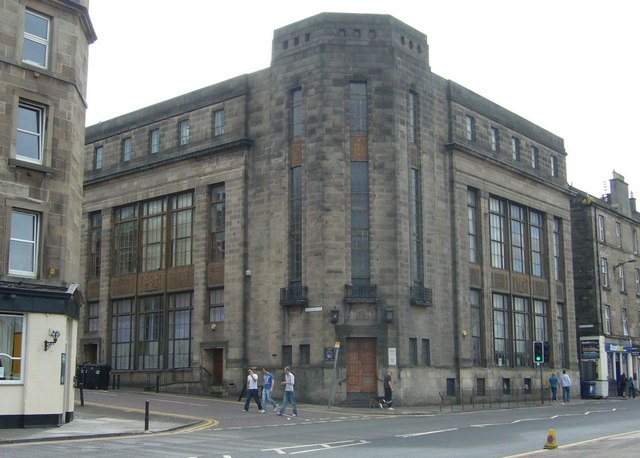
The art deco Fountainbridge Library

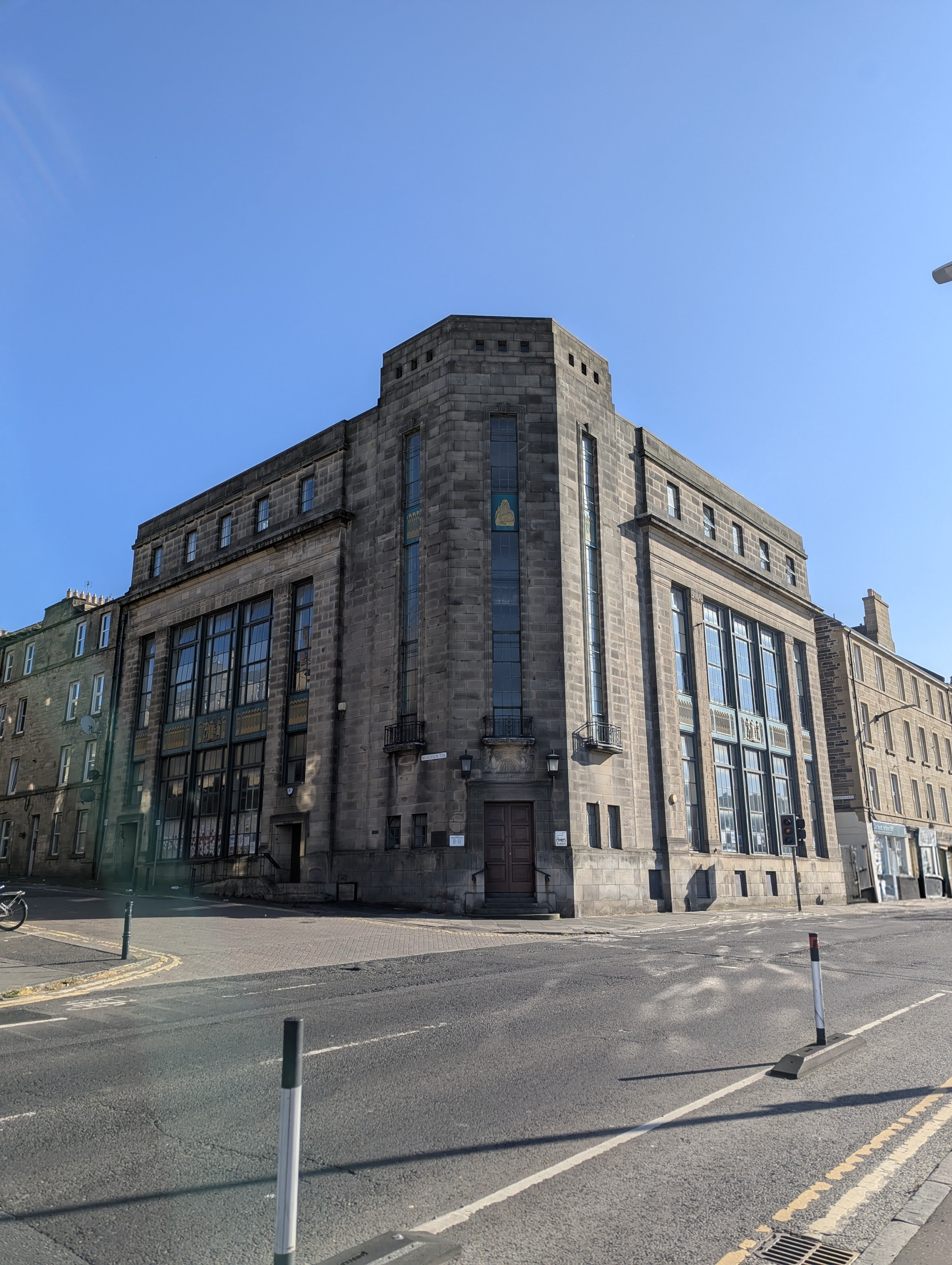
An image of Fountainbridge library taken from across the street in 2026.

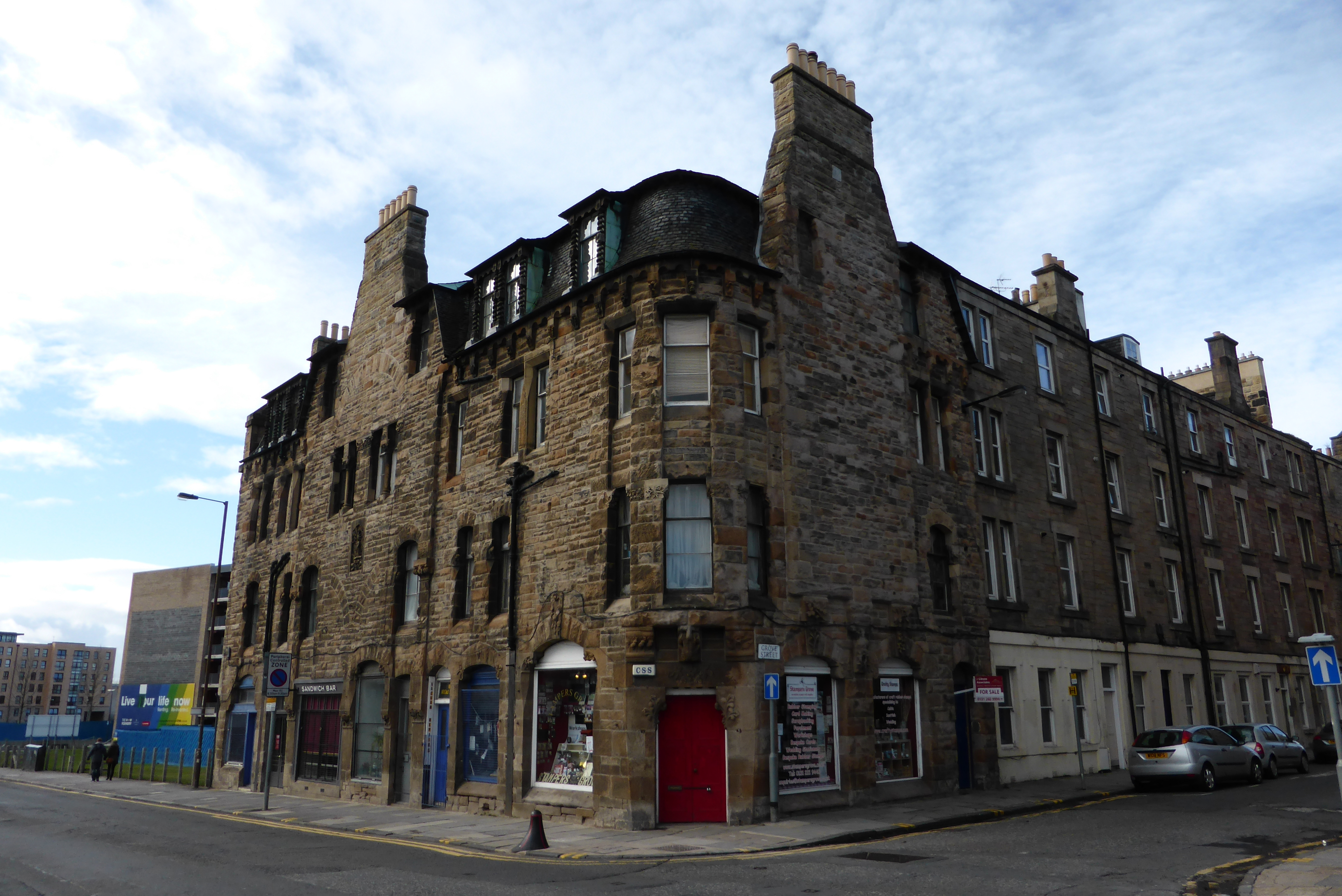
The corner of Fountainbridge and Grove Street

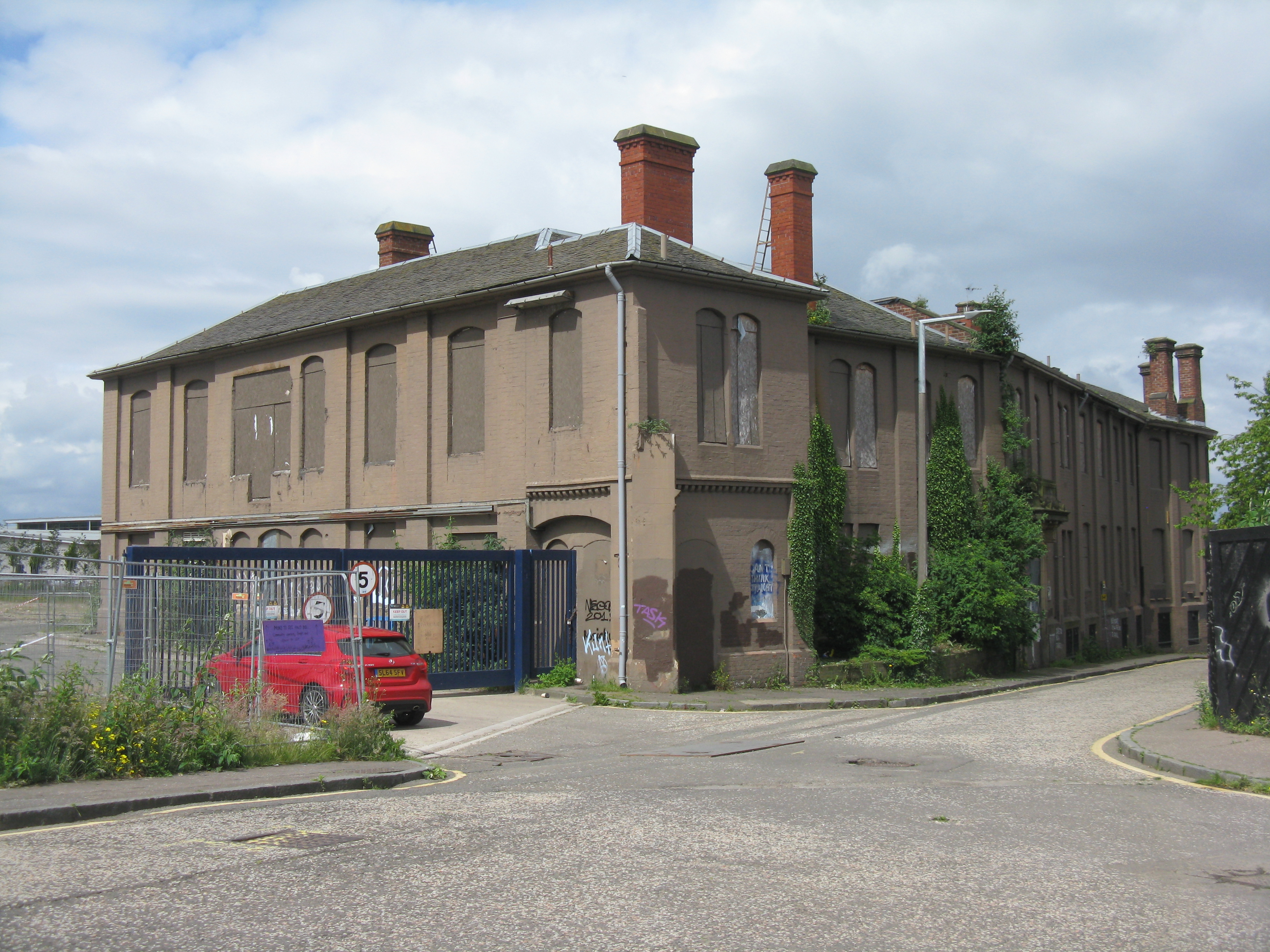
Castle Mills in its former derelict state
