= Lochrin =

Area of Edinburgh, Scotland

Coordinates: 55°56′33.24″N 3°12′29.29″W

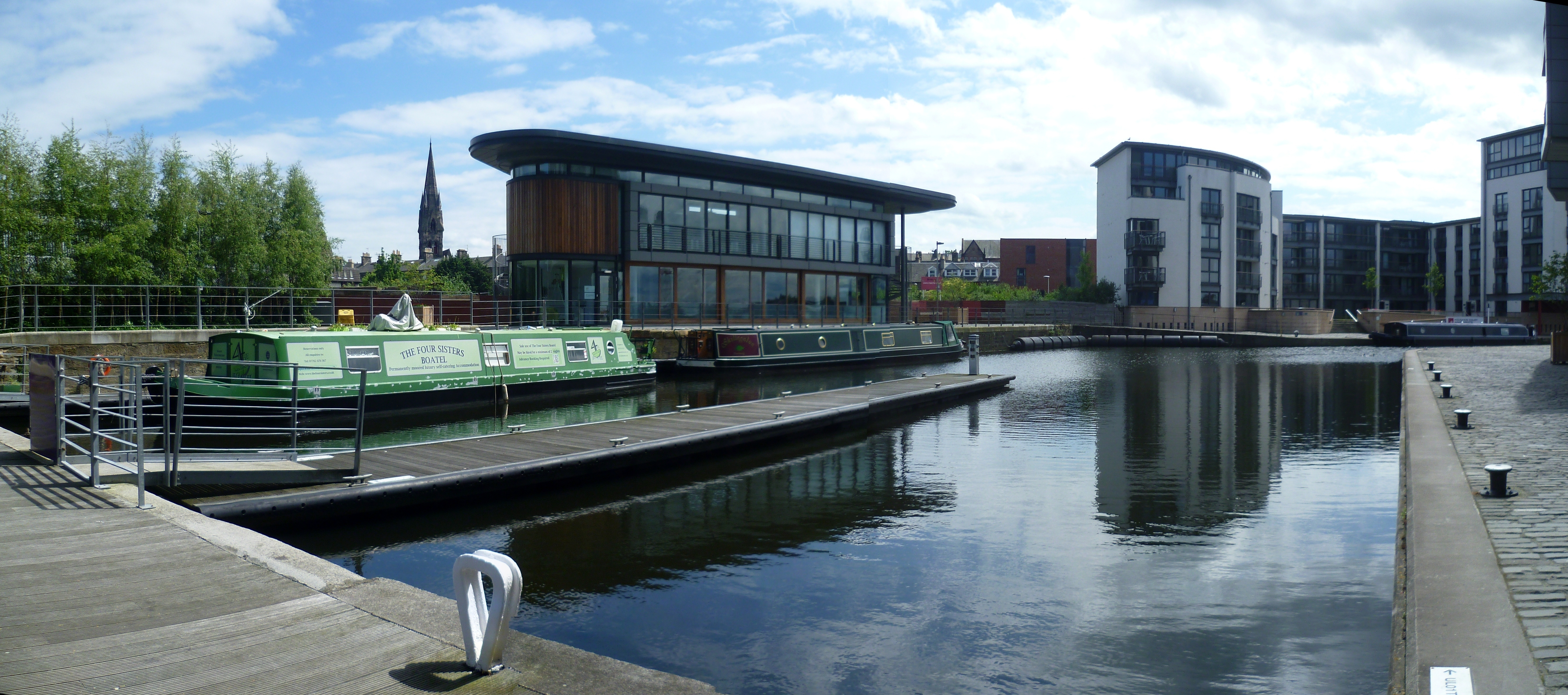
Lochrin Basin

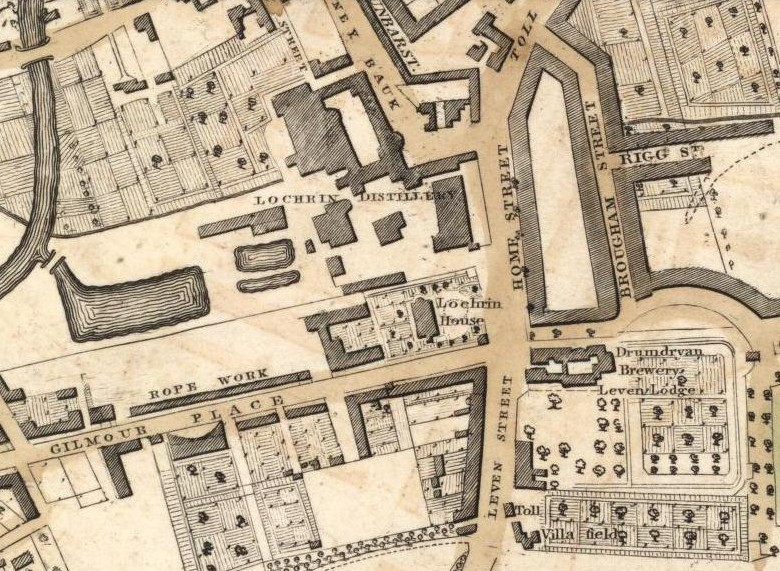
An 1831 map of the area

Lochrin is a small area in Edinburgh, the capital of Scotland. It is in the south-west corner of the city centre, to the west of Tollcross, and south of Fountainbridge. Lochrin contains a wide mixture of retail shops, leisure facilities, other businesses and tenement housing. Major new office and residential developments have replaced some of the older buildings.

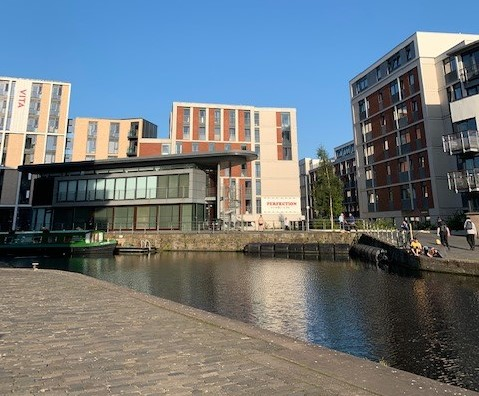
Lochrin Basin Fountainbridge

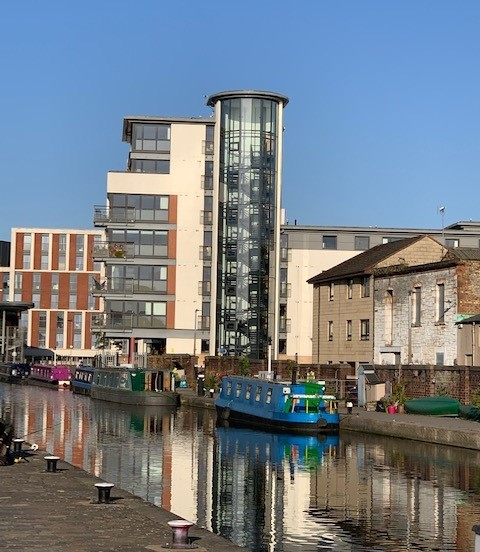
Lochrin Basin and boats at Edinburgh Quay

When the basins at the eastern end of the Union Canal were filled in and the canal truncated in 1921, Lochrin Basin became the eastern terminus. At that time, the Leamington Lift Bridge was moved from where Fountainbridge crossed the canal to its current location just to the west of the basin.

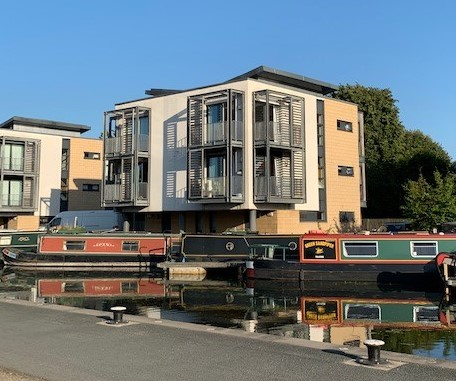
Residential boats 2021

Lochrin Basin is the centrepiece of Edinburgh Quay, a mixed-use development providing office and residential accommodation and licensed premises, which was voted the Best Regeneration project in Scotland at the Scottish Design Awards 2005. It is also the eastern end of the Forth and Clyde Canal Pathway.
