= Forth and Clyde Canal Pathway =

Canal walkway in Scotland

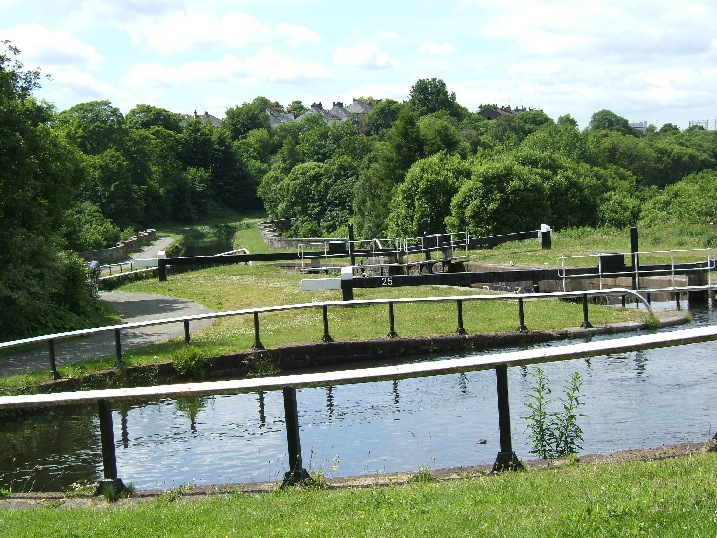
- Along the canal pathway
- Length: 106 km (66 mi)
- Location: Scotland
- Designation: Scotland's Great Trails
- Trailheads: Bowling, west of Glasgow (55.930°N 4.480°W); Lochrin, Edinburgh (55.943°N 3.208°W)
- Use: Hiking, cycling
- Elevation gain/loss: 158 m (518 ft) gain
- Website: https://www.scottishcanals.co.uk/activities/walking-running/forth-clyde-and-union-canals/

The Forth and Clyde canal pathway runs between the Firth of Forth and the Firth of Clyde and is a 106-kilometre-long (66 mi) footpath and cycleway that runs across Scotland, between Bowling, west of Glasgow, and Lochrin Basin (Edinburgh Quay) in Edinburgh. The path runs on the towpaths of the Forth & Clyde and Union Canals and is entirely off-road. The path is well maintained and its surface is generally good, although there are some stretches particularly between Falkirk and the outskirts of Edinburgh where wet weather leads to muddy conditions unsuitable for road intended bicycles. It is well used by walkers and cyclists, and designated as one of Scotland's Great Trails by NatureScot. It also forms part of the National Cycle Network, being designated as Route 754. Sustrans advises that the path is best followed from the Clyde to the Forth because the prevailing wind is from the south west. Much of the path is also suitable for experienced horseriders, although in some places low bridges, narrow aqueducts and gates may restrict access for horses.

== Route of the path ==
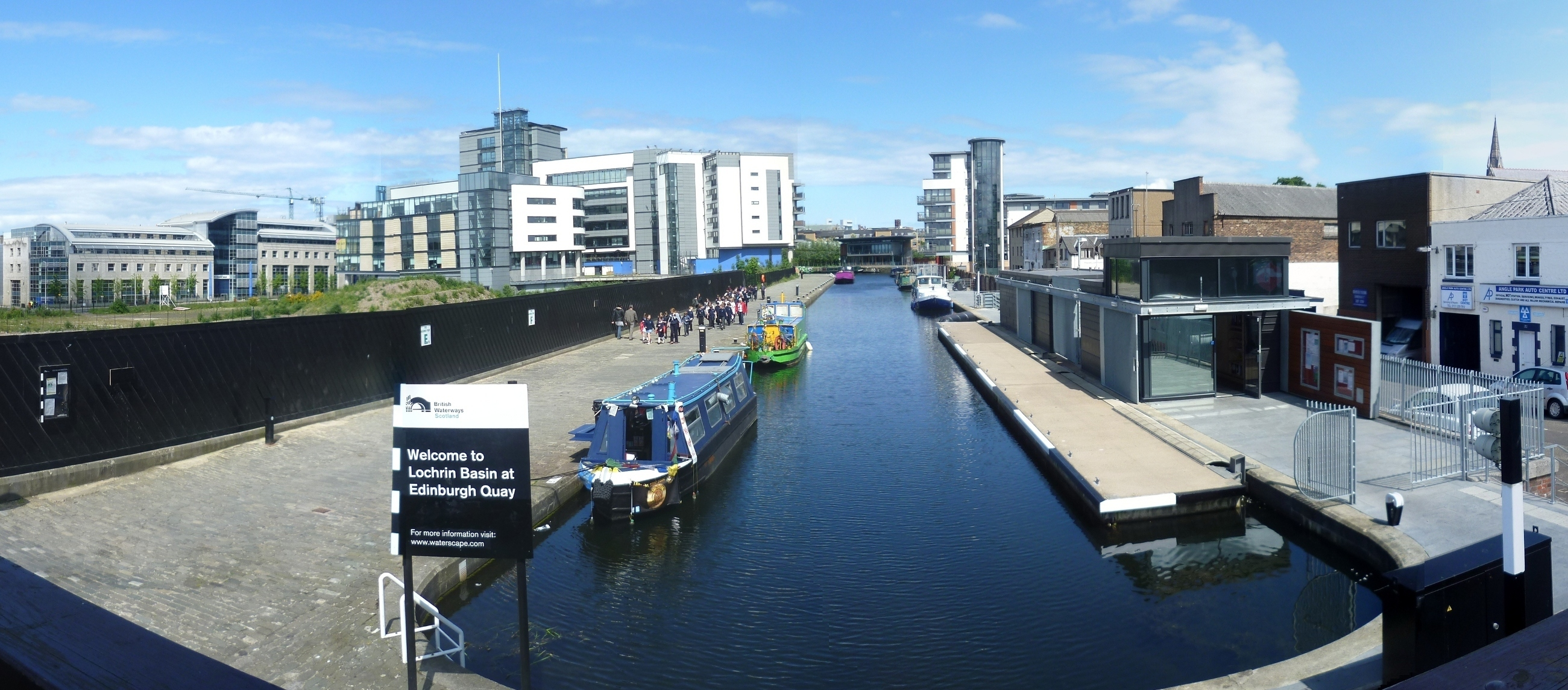
View of Edinburgh Quay

Following the path west to east, it begins at Bowling Basin where the Forth & Clyde Canal enters the Firth of Clyde. The canal runs east through Clydebank, Boghouse Locks, Clobberhill Locks, Temple Locks and Maryhill Locks. It passes close to the former Singer Sewing Machine Works which once employed 19,000 people and exported sewing machines all over the world, including many to pre-Revolutionary Russia. At Stockingfield Junction near Maryhill is the 'Glasgow Branch' a spur which originally connected to the Monkland Canal (which connected with Port Dundas, close to the city centre of Glasgow). A new footbridge was installed there in 2022.

From Stockingfield Junction the canal path runs north east, through Bishopbriggs, Kirkintilloch and Kilsyth, to the Falkirk Wheel where the Forth & Clyde Canal joins with the Union Canal. A branch of the Forth & Clyde Canal runs from Falkirk to the River Carron, near Grangemouth.

The path continues along the towpath of the Union Canal, through Linlithgow, past the red shale bings which are all that remains of Scotland's oilshale industry, and through the outskirts of Edinburgh. Unlike the Forth and Clyde Canal with its many lock systems, the Union Canal is a contour canal and there is only one lock, located near the Falkirk Wheel.

The path ends at the canal port at Lochrin Basin, Edinburgh Quay, near Tollcross, in the centre of Edinburgh. If desired the pathway can be extended a further 3 km through the centre of Edinburgh and down to Leith and Leith Docks on the National Cycle Route 75 which follows the same route after a meeting point near Kingsknowe in the south-west of the city.

Railway lines run close to the path for most of its length. Bowling Station, on the line from Glasgow, is close to the start of the path. Both Glasgow main line railway stations are in the centre of the city, only a few hundred metres apart. The line which has run close to the path from Bowling to Glasgow passes through Glasgow Central Station low-level. The railway line which runs close to the rest of the path runs from Glasgow Queen Street Station to Edinburgh Haymarket Station. In Croy, Falkirk and Linlithgow the canal passes only a few hundred metres from the railway stations. Edinburgh's Waverley Station and Haymarket Station are only a short distance from Lochrin Basin.

The path can be completed in three, roughly equal, sections:

1. Bowling Basin (Bowling Station) to Auchinstarry Basin, Kilsyth (Croy Station)
2. Auchinstarry Basin to Linlithgow Canal Centre (Linlithgow Station)
3. Linlithgow Canal Centre to Lochrin Basin (Haymarket and Waverley Stations)

== Places of interest along the path ==
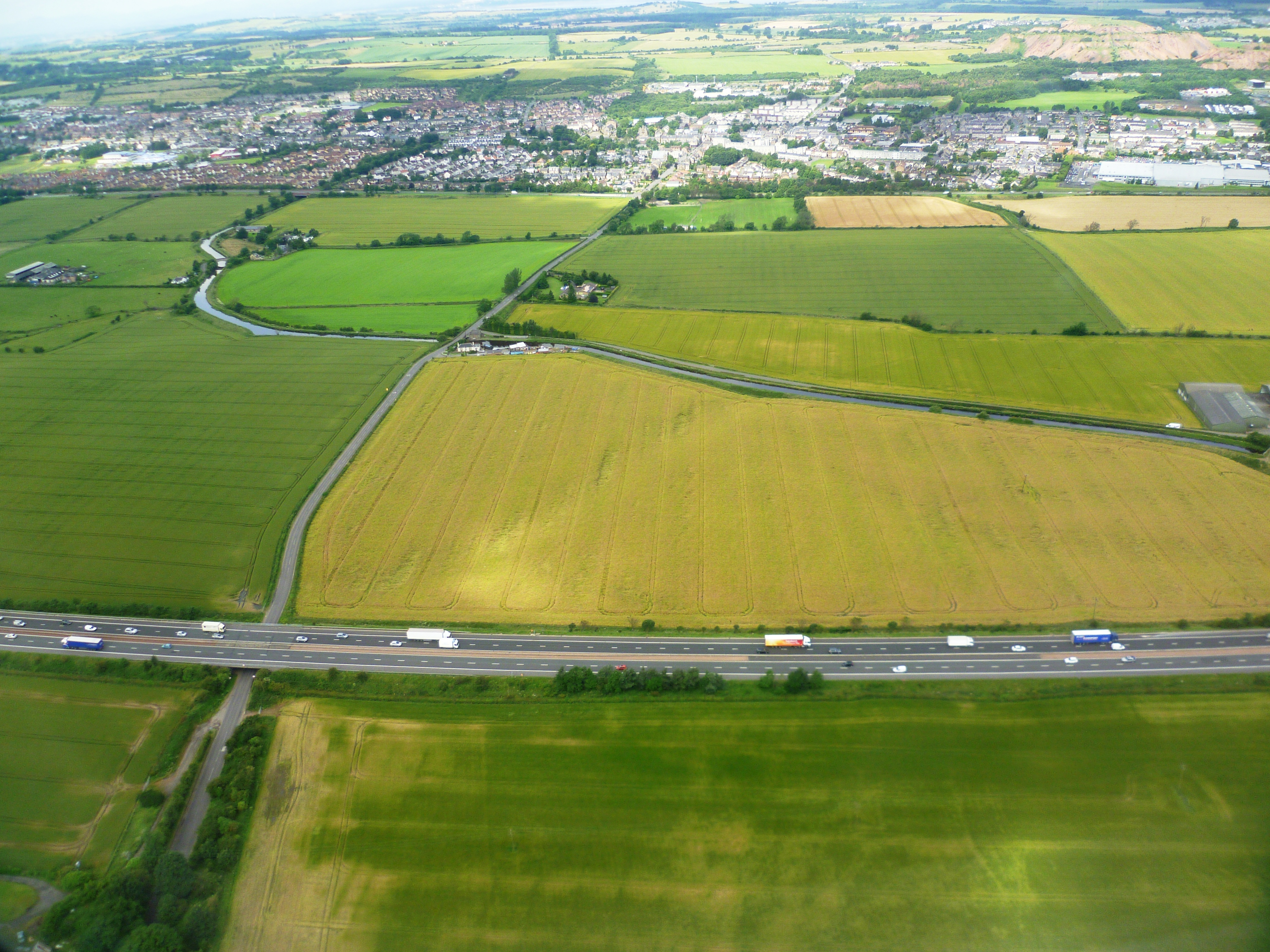
The canal, seen beyond the M8 motorway, deviates northwards just south of Broxburn, West Lothian.

- The Slateford Aqueduct on the outskirts of Edinburgh takes the canal over the Water of Leith.
- The Avon Aqueduct is west of Linlithgow and is 250 m (810 ft) long and 26 m (86 ft) high. It is the second largest aqueduct in Britain.
- At Broxburn on the Union Canal the path runs between a number of red shale bings. The world's oil industry was started near here by James 'Paraffin' Young who build an industry to extract oil from shale. The bings are the remains of an industry which once employed 10,000 people in the area. Some of the bings have been removed to provide foundation material for motorways, but many remain.
- The Almond Aqueduct is west of Ratho and takes the canal 23 m (75 ft) above the River Almond.
- The Falkirk Wheel allows water craft to move between the Forth & Clyde and Union canals. It replaces the eleven locks that used to allow boats to traverse the 110 ft (34 m) height difference between the two canals.
- The Falkirk Tunnel is the oldest and longest canal tunnel in Scotland. It is 631 metres long, 5.5 metres wide and 6 metres high.
- The burgh of Kilsyth, with Colzium estate and park
- The Antonine Wall, which is an ancient Roman fortification and wall, seen for example at Bar Hill near Twechar
- The Kelvin Aqueduct in Glasgow is 120 m (400 ft) long and 21 m (70 ft) high.

== Alternative coast to coast routes ==
Sustrans have devised an alternative coast to coast route across the Central Belt, Route 75. This starts at Gourock on the Firth of Clyde and then goes to Bell's Bridge in Glasgow, via Paisley. It then goes to Edinburgh via Airdrie, the Bathgate Railway Path, the Water of Leith Walkway and the Union Canal towpath. This route is longer at 171 mi (275 km) and only 98 mi (158 km) of the path are off-road. Another alternative route across central Scotland is the John Muir Way, which runs from Dunbar to Helensburgh, a distance of 215 km (215,000 m). This path includes a section along the Forth and Clyde Canal, and is also designated as one of Scotland's Great Trails.

== Gallery ==
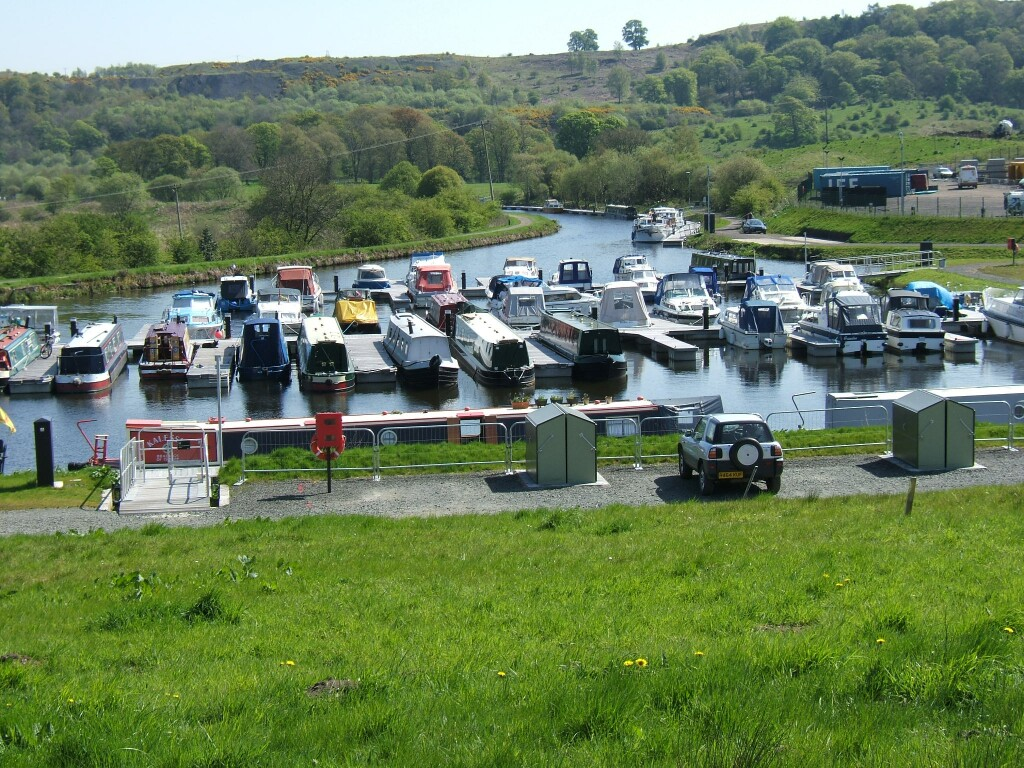
Auchinstarry Basin

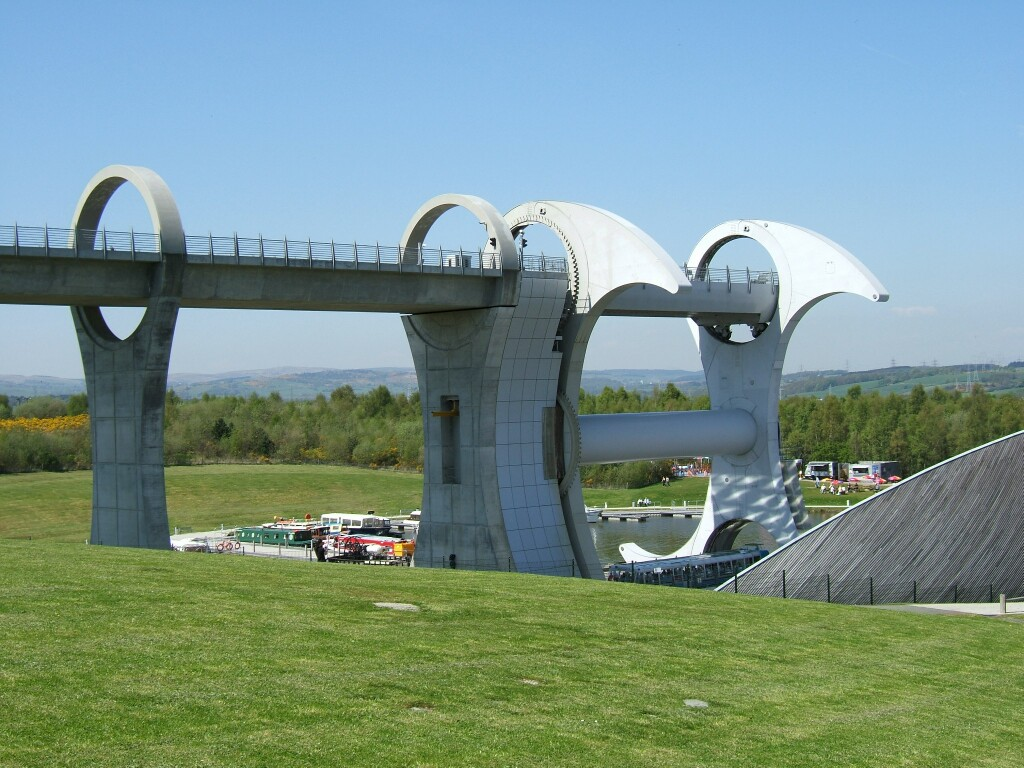
Falkirk Wheel

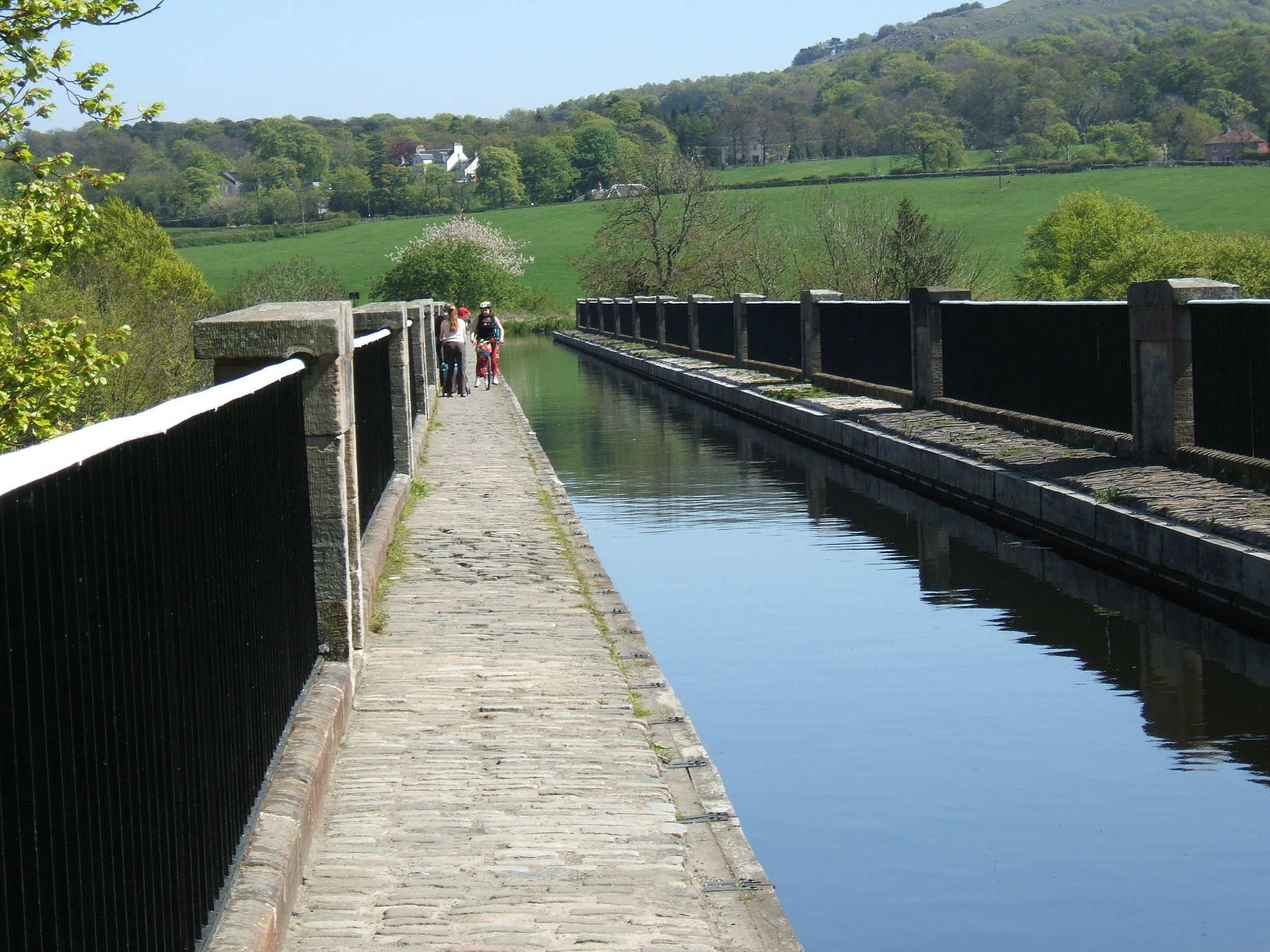
Avon Aqueduct

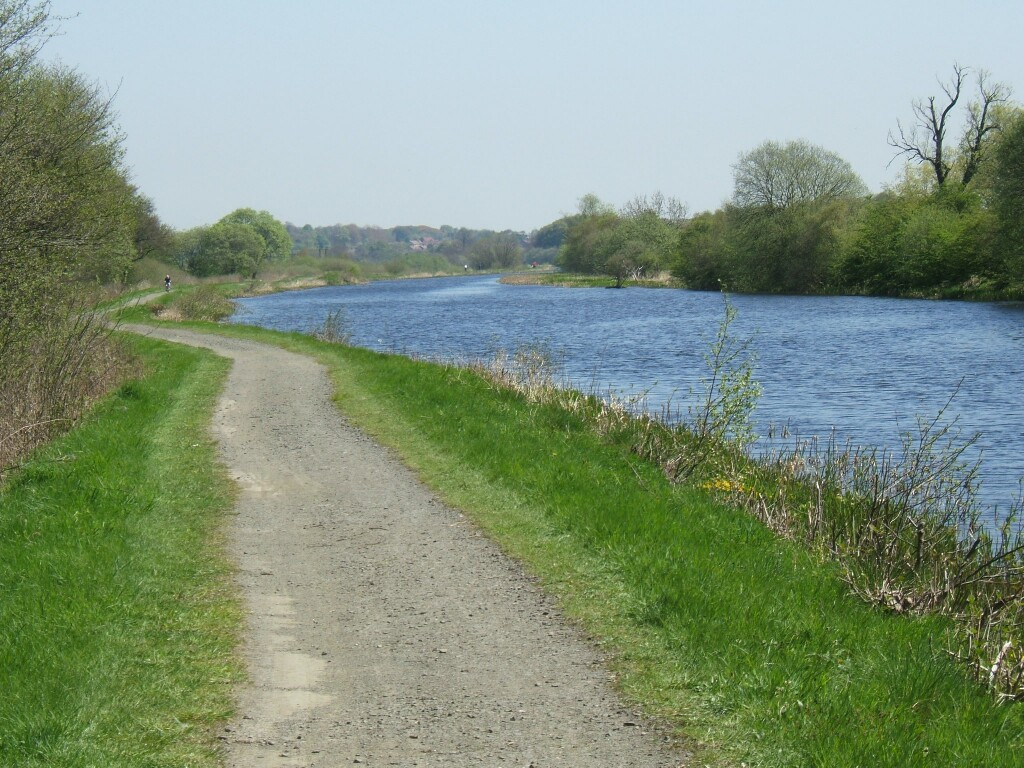
Union Canal

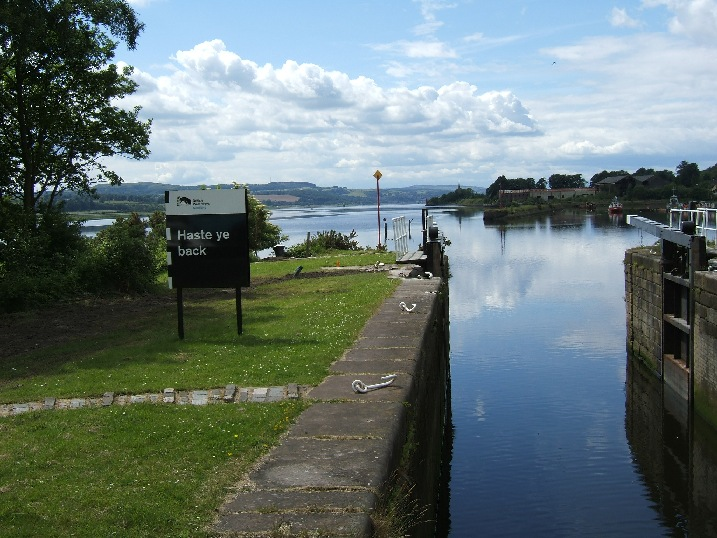
Bowling Basin

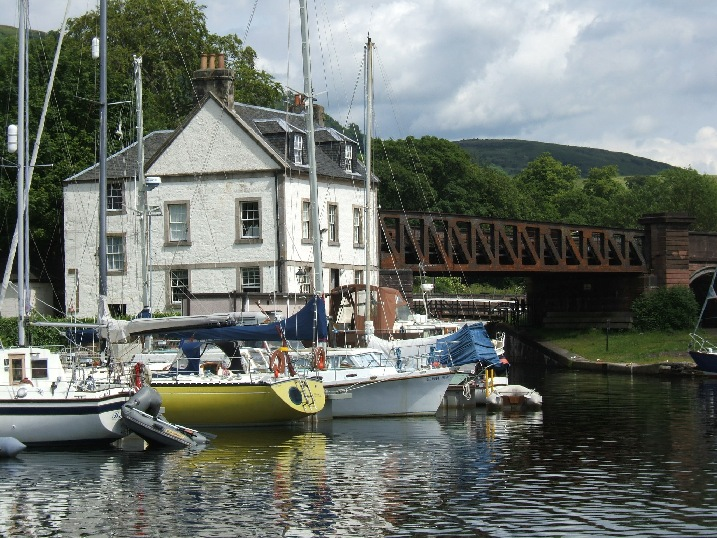
Bowling Basin

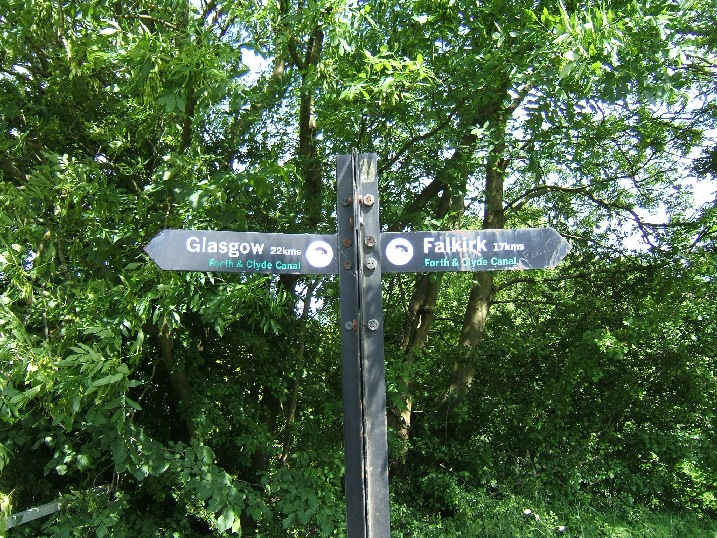
Forth & Clyde signpost

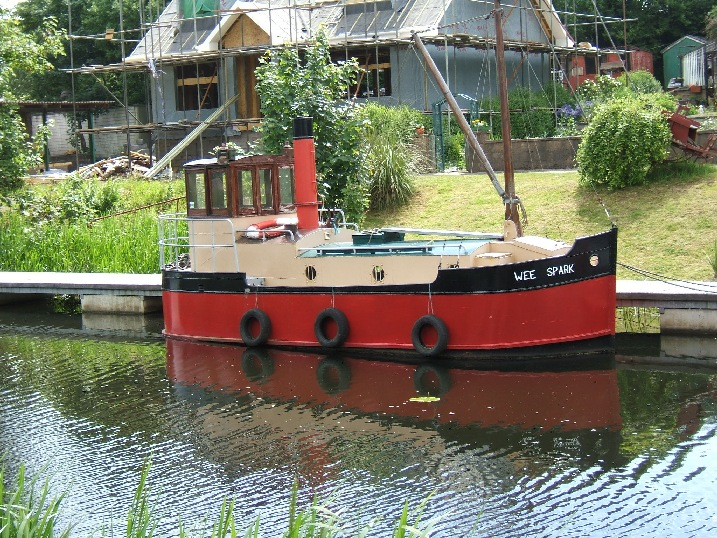
Union Canal

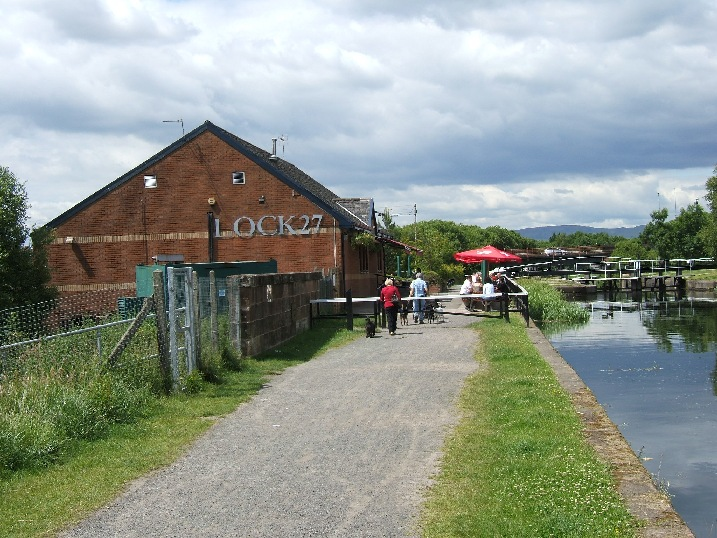
Forth & Clyde Lock 27

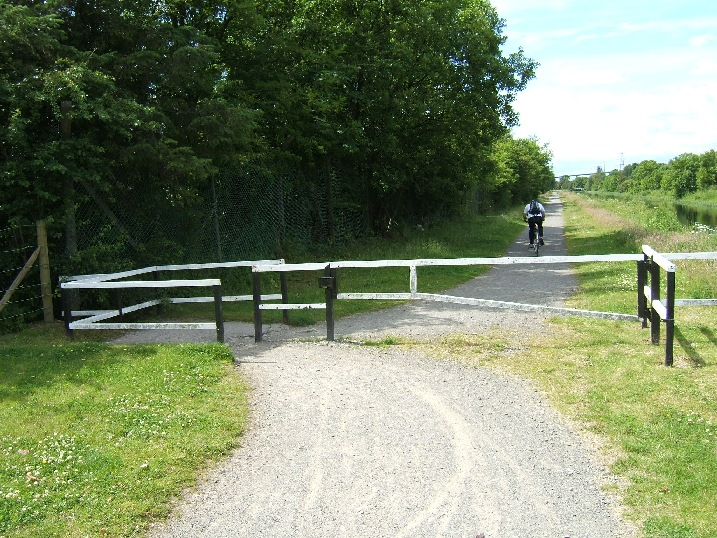
Forth & Clyde

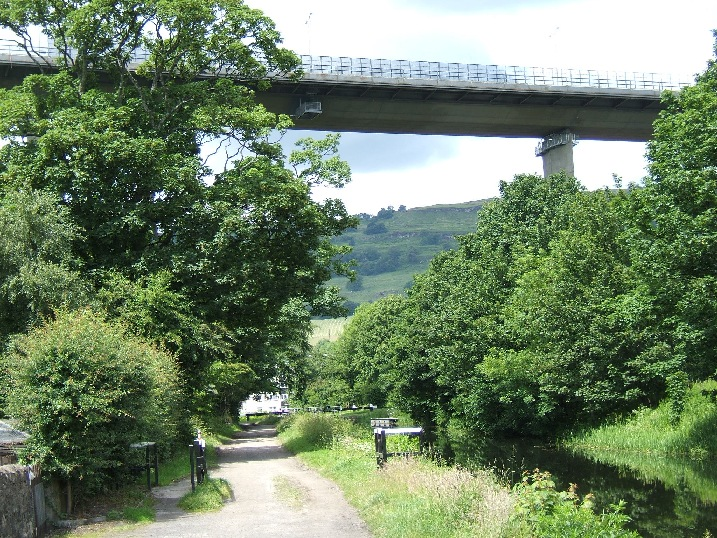
Under the Erskine Bridge

== Maps and guides ==
- Forth and Clyde and Union Canal - guide & maps to the route on Walkhighlands
- Annotated map of the route
- Forth & Clyde and Union Canals map by GEOprojects [UK]. ISBN 0-86351-139-2.
- Exploring the Edinburgh to Glasgow Canals by Hamish Brown. Mercat Press. Jul 2006. ISBN 1-84183-096-8.
