= Bonnington (disambiguation) =

Bonnington is a village and civil parish in Kent, England.

Bonnington may also refer to:

== Places in the United Kingdom ==
- Bonnington, Edinburgh, within the City of Edinburgh
- Bonnington, Scottish Borders, a location near Peebles, Scotland

== Other uses ==
- Bonnington (sternwheeler), a lake steamer in British Columbia, Canada
- Bonnington Aqueduct, part of the Union Canal west of Edinburgh, Scotland
- Bonnington Chemical Works, a pioneering coal tar processing facility in Edinburgh
- Bonnington Falls, a former waterfall, British Columbia, Canada
- Bonnington Falls, British Columbia, a community, British Columbia, Canada
- Bonnington House, near Wilkieston, West Lothian, Scotland
- Bonnington Pavilion, near New Lanark, ruins of an 18th-century Scottish structure
- Bonnington Power Station, near New Lanark, part of the Lanark Hydro Electric Scheme
- Bonnington Range, part of the Columbia Mountains in southeastern British Columbia, Canada
- Bonnington Square, square in Vauxhall, London, England

== See also ==
- Bonington (disambiguation)
