= Avon Viaduct =

Avon Viaduct may refer to any of several bridges crossing the various Rivers Avon:

- Avon Viaduct, Linlithgow, Scotland (crosses the Falkirk Avon)
- Avon Aqueduct (crosses the Falkirk Avon)
- Brandon Viaduct, Warwickshire, England (also known as the "Avon Viaduct"; crosses the Warwickshire Avon)
- Midland Counties Railway Viaduct, Rugby (sometimes referred to as the "Avon Viaduct"; crosses the Warwickshire Avon)
- Avon Bridge, Bristol (crosses the Bristol Avon)

== See also ==
- List of crossings of the River Avon, Warwickshire
