= List of canal aqueducts in the United Kingdom =

This list of canal aqueducts in the United Kingdom covers notable aqueducts that have articles in Wikipedia. The actual number of canal aqueducts is much greater.

Aqueduct	Canal	Designer	Coordinates	Notes	Image	Ref
Almond Aqueduct	Union Canal		55.9212°N 3.4337°W	Aqueduct over the River Almond in Edinburgh		
Ariel Aqueduct	Worcester and Birmingham Canal		52.4470°N 1.9378°W	Aqueduct over the Aston Webb Boulevard (Selly Oak Bypass) in Selly Oak, Birmingham, opened in 2011.		
Ash Aqueduct	Basingstoke Canal		51.2549°N 0.7300°W	Aqueduct over the A331 Blackwater Valley Road and the River Blackwater, opened in 1995.		
Avon Aqueduct	Union Canal		55.9701°N 3.6496°W	Scotland's longest and tallest aqueduct, crosses the River Avon at Falkirk		
Avoncliff Aqueduct	Kennet and Avon Canal	John Rennie	51.33935°N 2.28275°W	Crosses the River Avon (Bristol)		
Barton Swing Aqueduct	Bridgewater Canal	Sir Edward Leader Williams	53.474813°N 2.350334°W	Crosses the Manchester Ship Canal. Swings to let large vessels pass below.		
Beam Aqueduct	Rolle Canal	James Green	50.9672°N 4.1754°W	Formerly carried the Rolle Canal across the River Torridge		
Bonnington Aqueduct	Union Canal		55.9244°N 3.4144°W	Crosses the B7030 Cliftonhall Road	Bonnington Aqueduct near the M8	
Bullbridge Aqueduct	Cromford Canal		53.06404°N 1.46424°W	Demolished 1968. Originally crossed the Ambergate to Nottingham road.	Old engraving of the demolished Bull Bridge Aqueduct	
Chirk Aqueduct	Llangollen Canal		52.9287°N 3.0616°W	Crosses the Ceiriog Valley		
Clifton Aqueduct	Manchester, Bolton and Bury Canal		53.527344°N 2.316814°W	Grade II listed building, crosses the River Irwell	Clifton Aqueduct from Clifton Viaduct	
Congleton Aqueduct	Macclesfield Canal	Thomas Telford	53.156559°N 2.201298°W	Crosses Canal Road, Congleton. One of three of similar design by Thomas Telford, the others at Stretton and Nantwich.		
Cosgrove Aqueduct	Grand Union Canal	Benjamin Bevan	52.068798°N 0.833641°W	Crosses the River Great Ouse. Built to replace an earlier aqueduct which collapsed.		
Dowley Gap Aqueduct	Leeds and Liverpool Canal	James Brindley	53.840295°N 1.815765°W	Crosses the River Aire. Also known as the Seven Arches Aqueduct.		
Dundas Aqueduct	Kennet and Avon Canal	John Rennie	51°21′40″N 02°18′36″W	Crosses the River Avon (Bristol) and the Wessex Main Line railway. Designed in a classical style, this is now a Scheduled Monument		
Edstone Aqueduct	Stratford-upon-Avon Canal		52.2464°N 1.7641°W	The longest aqueduct in England, crosses a minor road, the Birmingham and North Warwickshire railway, and also the trackbed of the former Alcester Railway.		
Engine Arm Aqueduct	Birmingham Canal Navigations		52.4979°N 1.9665°W	Cast by Horseley Ironworks. Carries the Engine Arm over the BCN Main Line		
Ewood Aqueduct	Leeds and Liverpool Canal		53.7335°N 2.4926°W	Grade II listed building, crosses the River Darwen & B6447		
Glen Loy Aqueduct	Caledonian Canal		56.8903°N 5.0398°W	Carries the Caledonian Canal over the River Loy		
Holliday Street Aqueduct	Worcester and Birmingham Canal		52.4762°N 1.9079°W	A Grade II listed building adjacent to Gas Street Basin. In the form of an extended tunnel which includes the original Bridge Street approach to old Worcester Wharf.		
Kelvin Aqueduct	Forth and Clyde Canal	Robert Whitworth	55.8923°N 4.3017°W	Carries Forth and Clyde Canal over the River Kelvin		
Lichfield Canal Aqueduct	Lichfield Canal		52.655164°N 1.901584°W	A modern construction for a canal under restoration; not yet in water. Crosses the M6 Toll.	View of the open ended aqueduct over the M6 Toll	
Luggie Aqueduct	Forth and Clyde Canal	John Smeaton	55.939655°N 4.151065°W	Category A listed building, crosses the Luggie Water (now culverted)		
Lune Aqueduct	Lancaster Canal	John Rennie	54°4′5.94″N 2°47′21.07″W	Grade II listed building, crosses the River Lune		
Marple Aqueduct	Peak Forest Canal	Benjamin Outram and Thomas Brown	53.4073°N 2.0691°W	A Scheduled Monument, crosses the River Goyt. Grade II listed.		
Murtry Aqueduct	Dorset and Somerset Canal		51.247°N 2.342°W	Never used. Spans the Mells River near Frome, Somerset		
Nantwich Aqueduct	Shropshire Union Canal	Thomas Telford	53.069231°N 2.535698°W	Cast-iron aqueduct dated around 1826; grade II* listed; crosses the A534 just outside Nantwich.		
New Semington Aqueduct	Kennet and Avon Canal		51.34709°N 2.14497°W	Modern aqueduct opened in 2004, crosses the A350 road.		
North Circular Road Aqueduct	Grand Union Canal (Paddington Branch)		51°32'17"N 0°16'54"W	Original aqueduct opened 1933, replacement opened 1993 to span widened A406 North Circular Road in London		
Palmerston Street Aqueduct	Macclesfield Canal	William Crosley	53.298011°N 2.101987°W	Grade II listed stone aqueduct built 1829-31, crosses the B5090 road. Stone embankments to each side, the river Dean was displaced by this and runs in a tunnel under the left side.		
Pontcysyllte Aqueduct	Llangollen Canal	Thomas Telford	52.970534°N 3.087834°W	A cast iron trough 1,007 feet long supported 126 feet above the river by 19 masonry piers. Crosses the River Dee in Wales. Unesco World Heritage site.		
Prestolee Aqueduct	Manchester, Bolton and Bury Canal		53.5525°N 2.3764°W	Grade II listed building, crosses the River Irwell.		
Rea Aqueduct	Leominster Canal		52.33°N 2.51°W	Crosses the River Rea		
River Cart Aqueduct (Blackhall Bridge)	Former Glasgow, Paisley and Johnstone Canal	John Rennie and Thomas Telford	55.839986°N 4.406396°W	Carried former Glasgow, Paisley and Johnstone Canal across White Cart Water. Now converted to railway viaduct.		
River Tame Aqueduct	Birmingham and Fazeley Canal		52.5083N, -1.8605W	Carries the Birmingham and Fazeley Canal over the River Tame Just South of Salford Junction, junction with the Tame Valley Canal		
Scott Russell Aqueduct	Union Canal		55.9218°N 3.3070°W	Passes over the A720 Edinburgh Bypass		
Semington Aqueduct	Kennet and Avon Canal		51.34709°N 2.14497°W	Crosses Semington Brook		
Slateford Aqueduct	Union Canal		55.9175°N 3.2499°W	Crosses Inglis Green Road and the Water of Leith in Edingburgh		
Stockingfield Aqueduct	Forth and Clyde Canal	Robert Whitworth	55.8927°N 4.2863°W	Crosses Lochburn Road Road in the Lambhill district of Glasgow		
Stanley Ferry Aqueduct	Aire and Calder Navigation	George Leather	53.702417°N 1.462394°W	One of the earliest through arch bridges in the world, crosses the River Calder, West Yorkshire.		
Stewart Aqueduct	BCN Main Line	Thomas Telford	52.5059°N 1.9974°W	The M5 motorway (1970) crosses the West Coast Main Line (1852) crosses the BCN Old Main Line Canal (1770) crosses the BCN New Main Line Canal (1828)	Stewart Aqueduct from the New Main Line	
Store Street Aqueduct	Ashton Canal	Benjamin Outram	53°28′46.39″N 2°13′38.45″W	Built on a skew of 45 degrees across the highway, and believed to be the first of its kind in Great Britain. Crosses Store Street, Manchester.		
Stretton Aqueduct	Shropshire Union Canal	Thomas Telford	52.694267°N 2.189412°W	One of Telford's last aqueducts and grade II listed since 1985. Crosses the A5 road. An inscription in the centre panel reads: "Birmingham and Liverpool Canal Thos. Telford F.R.S.I.& E. Engineer 1832"		
Three Bridges, London	Grand Junction Canal	Isambard Kingdom Brunel	51.5044182°N 0.3554333°W	Brunel's last major project, and a scheduled monument, a unique arrangement carrying rail, road, and canal routes across each other.	View of canal and road bridges crossing the railway line looking east	
Wootton Wawen Aqueduct	Stratford-upon-Avon Canal	W Whitmore	52.264039°N 1.769911°W	Crosses the A3400 road.		
Yarningale Aqueduct	Stratford-upon-Avon Canal		52.2952°N 1.7316°W	Crosses Kingswood Brook.		

== See also ==
- Category:Aqueducts in the United Kingdom
- Navigable aqueduct
- Canals of the United Kingdom
- List of canal basins in the United Kingdom
- List of canal junctions in the United Kingdom
- List of canal locks in the United Kingdom
- List of canal tunnels in the United Kingdom
