= Almond Aqueduct =

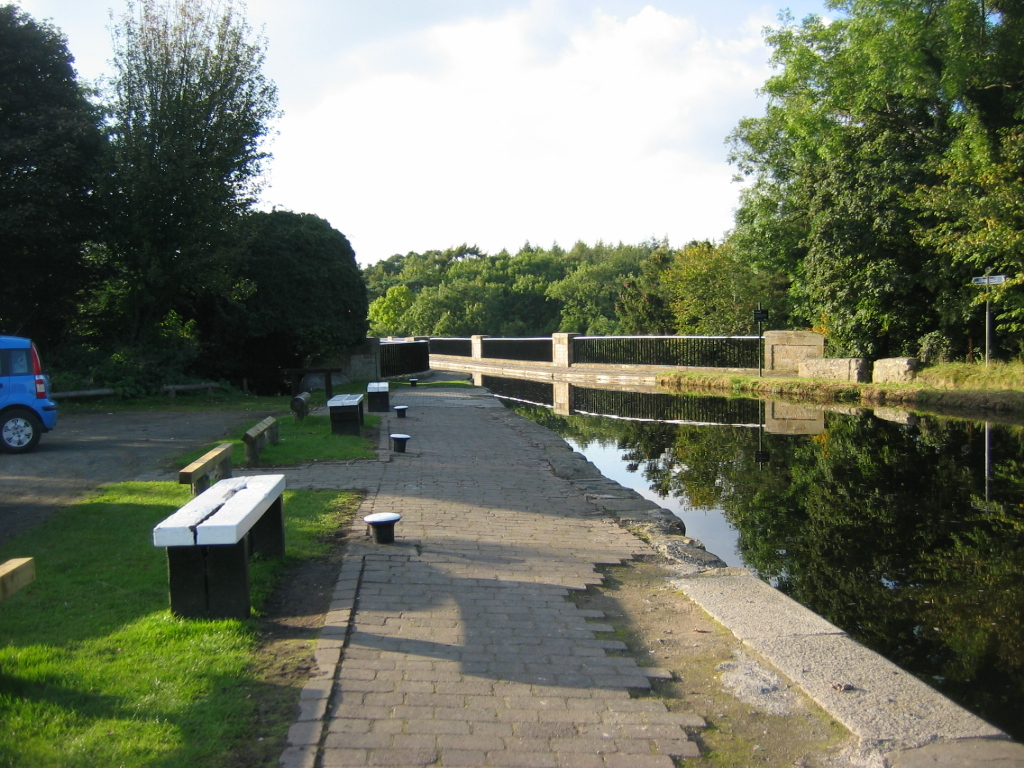
- Coordinates: 55.9212°N 3.4337°W
- OS grid reference: NT 10481 70622
- Carries: Union Canal
- Crosses: River Almond
- Locale: West Lothian; City of Edinburgh
- Maintained by: British Waterways

Characteristics
- Total length: 130 metres (430 ft)
- Height: 23 metres (75 ft)

Listed Building – Category A
- Official name: Union Canal, Almond Aqueduct, River Avon Near Linn's Mill
- Designated: 21 February 1971
- Reference no.: LB7430

Listed Building – Category A
- Official name: Union Canal, Almond Aqueduct, River Almond At Lin's Mill
- Designated: 21 February 1971
- Reference no.: LB27793

Location
- Interactive map of Almond Aqueduct

The Almond Aqueduct, also known as the Lin's Mill Aqueduct, is a navigable aqueduct that carries the Union Canal over the River Almond in Scotland, west of Ratho, Edinburgh.

== History ==
The aqueduct was built to a design by Hugh Baird, with advice from Thomas Telford, in tandem with the Slateford Aqueduct and Avon Aqueduct, with which it shares its design. Baird had originally proposed to have only a single span, with embankments carrying the canal the rest of the way, but eventually decided to use the same design as the other two aqueducts.

Telford was not convinced that the stone arches were necessary in conjunction with the iron trough, but Baird used both on all three major aqueducts. Construction was carried out by Messrs. Craven, Whitaker and Nowell between 1819 and 1821, their success in building a stone bridge over the River Ouse making their tender for the contract "by far the most eligible."

In 1970 it was designated as a scheduled monument and in 1971 it was given Category A status, being individually listed for each local authority (the river denotes the boundary between West Lothian and Edinburgh). In 2003 the Union Canal became a scheduled monument thus causing the aqueduct to be scheduled twice and leading to the original designation being removed in 2019.

== Design ==
The Barton Aqueduct of 1761, and subsequent canal aqueducts in the United Kingdom, used large quantities of masonry and puddling to obtain watertightness. After the success of The Iron Bridge in 1789, however, cast iron was used by Telford on aqueducts such as Chirk and Pontcysyllte. Aqueducts built in the early part of the 19th century use either puddle clay or an iron trough in no particular pattern. The Almond Aqueduct uses an iron trough to achieve watertightness, as well as containing the outward pressure of the water, allowing it to be of more slender construction than a purely stone aqueduct such as the Kelvin Aqueduct.

Measuring 420 feet (130 m) long, it carries the Union Canal 76 feet (23 m) above the River Almond, from Edinburgh into West Lothian. A sluice into the Almond allows regulation of the water level in the canal, and near to the aqueduct is a feeder from Cobbinshaw Reservoir. The aqueduct can be reached by car by way of a track and by walkers and cyclists on the Union Canal towpath.

== See also ==
- List of canal aqueducts in Great Britain
