= Avon Gorge (Falkirk) =

Small Scottish gorge

Coordinates: 55.99444°N 3.66890°W

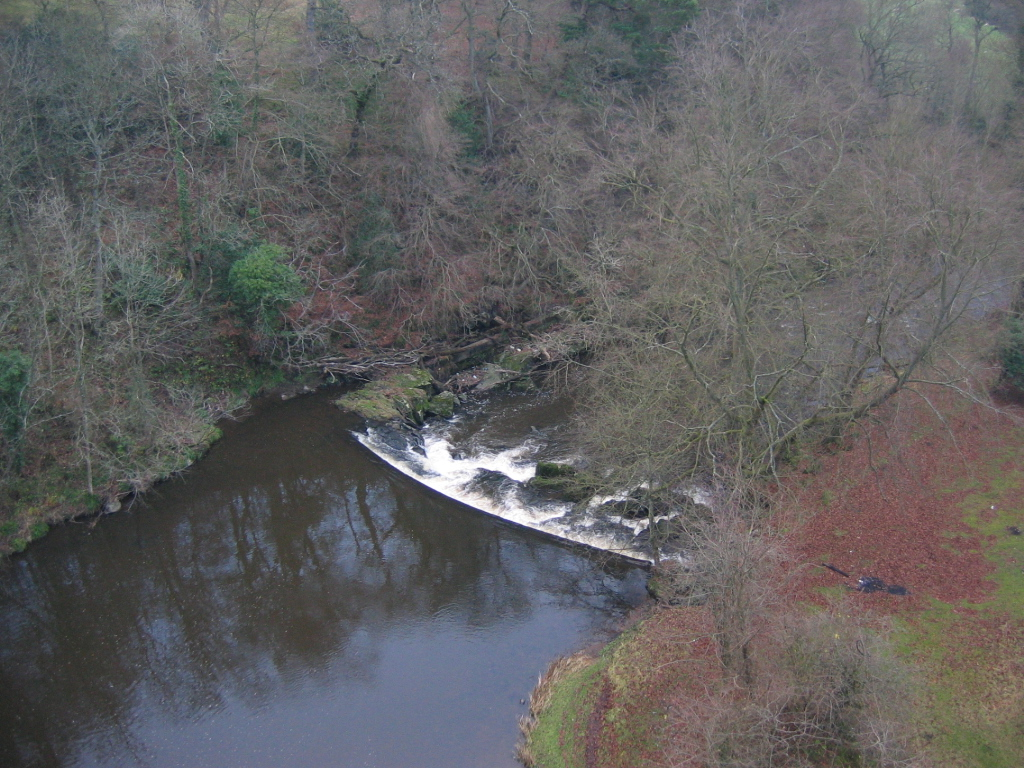
View of the River Avon from the Avon Aqueduct

The Avon Gorge (grid reference NS960792) is a small wooded gorge in Falkirk, Scotland.

== Biology ==
An area of 19.05 hectares (47.1 acres) of the gorge is a biological Site of Special Scientific Interest; it was notified in 1986. The steep wooded banks constitute one of the few remaining ancient, semi-natural woodland sites in Falkirk District.

Plants found here which are rare in Falkirk District include alternate-leaved golden saxifrage (chrysosplenium alternifolium), moschatel (adoxa moschatellina) and hemp agrimony (eupatorium cannabinum). The site also contains pendulous sedge (carex pendula) and lily of the valley (convallaria majalis) both of which are uncommon in Scotland.

The Avon Gorge is one of the few remaining oak-dominated woodlands in the central belt of Scotland, others include the nearby Callendar wood.

== History ==
After defeat at the Battle of Falkirk, William Wallace reportedly took refuge in a cave in the Avon Gorge. The cave is signposted from a nearby road as 'Wallace's Cave'.

== Transport ==
The A801 road cuts through the Avon Gorge and has a small crossing point accompanied by steep dips. This has been recognised as an accident blackspot particularly in bad weather conditions. There have been numerous calls from local politicians for upgrades to take place and for a new bridge crossing to be built over the gorge. However there have been no firm commitments from local authorities or national government for such a scheme.

== See also ==
- Avon Aqueduct
- River Avon
