= List of Category A listed buildings in Falkirk =

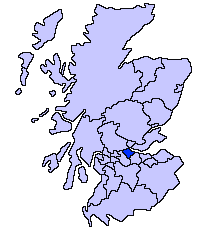
Falkirk shown within Scotland

This is a list of Category A listed buildings in the Falkirk council area, central Scotland.

In Scotland, the term listed building refers to a building or other structure officially designated as being of "special architectural or historic interest". Category A structures are those considered to be "buildings of national or international importance, either architectural or historic, or fine little-altered examples of some particular period, style or building type." Listing was begun by a provision in the Town and Country Planning (Scotland) Act 1947, and the current legislative basis for listing is the Planning (Listed Buildings and Conservation Areas) (Scotland) Act 1997. The authority for listing rests with Historic Scotland, an executive agency of the Scottish Government, which inherited this role from the Scottish Development Department in 1991. Once listed, severe restrictions are imposed on the modifications allowed to a building's structure or its fittings. Listed building consent must be obtained from local authorities prior to any alteration to such a structure. There are approximately 47,400 listed buildings in Scotland, of which around 8% (some 3,800) are Category A.

The council area of Falkirk covers 297 square kilometres (115 sq mi), and has a population of around 151,600. There are 27 Category A listed buildings in the area.

== Listed buildings ==
Name	Location	Date listed	Geo-coordinates	Notes	LB number	Image
Blackness Castle	Blackness		56°00′21″N 3°30′59″W	15th-century castle with later alterations	230	Upload another image See more images
Airth Mercat Cross	Airth		56°04′05″N 3°46′12″W	Late 17th-century market cross	2095	Upload another image See more images
Airth Castle	Airth		56°03′42″N 3°46′05″W	16th-century castle with a 19th-century facade by David Hamilton	2102	Upload another image See more images
Dunmore Pineapple	Dunmore Park, Dunmore		56°04′36″N 3°47′12″W	18th-century garden building in the shape of a pineapple	2109	Upload another image See more images
Torwood Castle	Torwood		56°02′17″N 3°52′12″W	Remains of 16th-century tower house	3962	Upload another image See more images
Parkhill House	Polmont		55°59′24″N 3°43′07″W	Late 18th-century mansion	8301	Upload Photo
Westquarter Dovecot	Westquarter		55°59′21″N 3°44′37″W	17th-century rectangular dovecote	8315	Upload another image
Royal Scottish National Hospital, Principal Block	Larbert		56°01′55″N 3°50′00″W	19th-century former hospital by Frederick Thomas Pilkington	10481	Upload another image
Carronvale House	Larbert		56°01′02″N 3°49′08″W	18th-century house remodelled 1897 by Sir John Burnet	10487	Upload another image See more images
Larbert Old Parish Churchyard and monuments	Larbert		56°01′08″N 3°50′17″W	Churchyard with several significant graves including James Bruce of Kinnaird and Mary Dundas	10496	Upload another image See more images
Stenhouse and Carron Parish Church, former Maclaren Memorial Church	Stenhousemuir		56°01′38″N 3°48′19″W	Romanesque church of circa 1900 by John James Burnet	10503	Upload Photo
Castlecary Castle	Castlecary		55°58′31″N 3°56′45″W	15th-century tower house	10519	Upload another image See more images
Avon Aqueduct	Union Canal, over River Avon		55°57′51″N 3°39′22″W	12-arch aqueduct opened 1822 (Note: Also in West Lothian, as it crosses the River Avon which is the council boundary)	15321	Upload another image See more images
Avon Viaduct	Westfield, over River Avon		55°56′07″N 3°42′32″W	20-arch former railway viaduct opened 1842	15326	Upload another image See more images
Bo'ness Station	Bo'ness		56°01′04″N 3°35′58″W	19th-century railway station buildings, now part of Bo'ness and Kinneil Railway	22337	Upload another image See more images
Carriden House	Carriden, Bo'ness		56°00′38″N 3°33′55″W	17th-century mansion	22339	Upload another image See more images
Church Wynd, Graveyards	Bo'ness		56°00′57″N 3°36′38″W	Two graveyards with monuments of 17th century and later	22350	Upload another image
Kinneil House	Kinneil, Bo'ness		56°00′26″N 3°38′03″W	Late 15th-century tower house with 16th- and 17th-century remodelling	22358	Upload another image See more images
49 North Street, Dymock's Buildings	Bo'ness		56°01′04″N 3°36′31″W	Late-17th-century town houses and industrial buildings	22379	Upload another image See more images
The Hippodrome	Bo'ness		56°01′03″N 3°36′30″W	Early Modern cinema by Matthew Steele, 1911	22380	Upload another image See more images
Falkirk Old Parish Church	Falkirk, High Street		56°00′01″N 3°47′09″W	Medieval church, mostly rebuilt in the 19th century, spire added by William Adam, 1738	31167	Upload another image See more images
Falkirk Steeple	Falkirk, High Street		55°59′57″N 3°47′03″W	Classical clock tower by David Hamilton, 1814	31178	Upload another image See more images
Callendar House	Callendar Park, Falkirk		55°59′40″N 3°46′02″W	14th-century tower house with later additions, remodelled in French style by Brown and Wardrop, 1877	31236	Upload another image See more images
Callendar House Mausoleum	Callendar Park, Falkirk		55°59′29″N 3°45′32″W	Classical mausoleum by Archibald Elliot, 1816	31241	Upload another image
St Mary's Roman Catholic Church	Camelon		56°00′17″N 3°49′23″W	Church of 1960 by Gillespie Kidd and Coia	31252	Upload another image See more images
Dundas Church	Grangemouth		56°01′08″N 3°43′10″W	Romanesque church of 1894 by John James Burnet	34041	Upload Photo

== See also ==
- Scheduled monuments in Falkirk
