= Hugh Baird (engineer) =

Scottish civil engineer

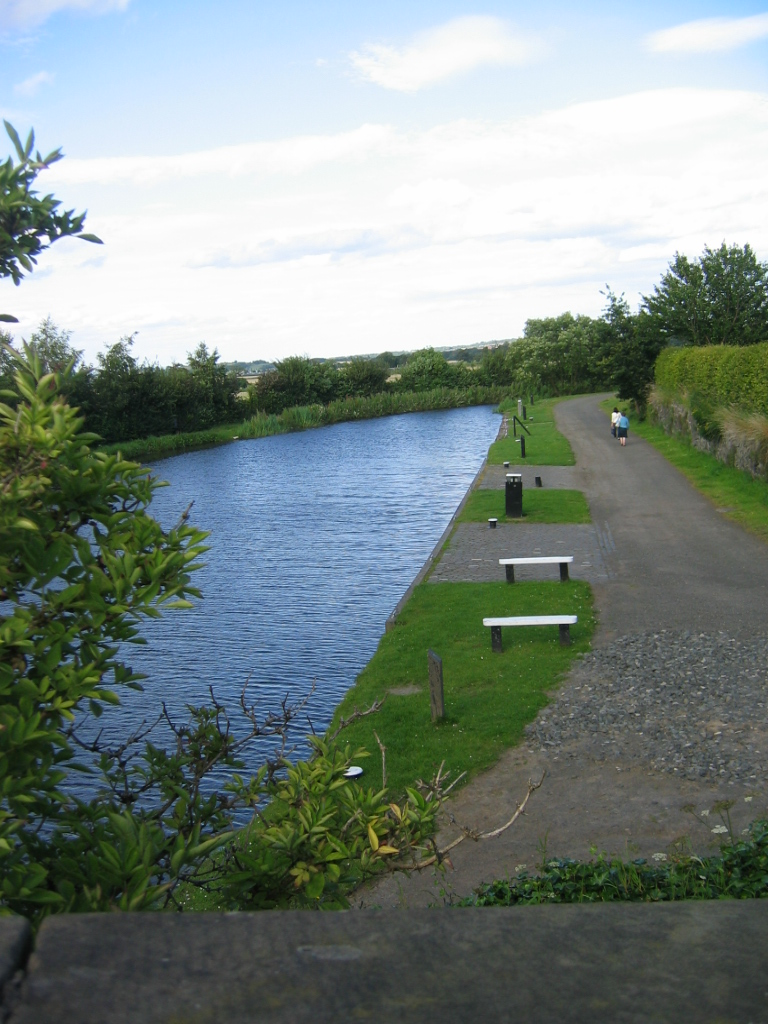
Ratho Basin, on the Union Canal

Hugh Baird (10 September 1770 – 24 September 1827) was a Scottish civil engineer, who designed and oversaw the building of the Union Canal.

== Life ==
Born at Westertown, Bothkennar, Stirlingshire, he was the son of Nicol Baird, surveyor to the Forth and Clyde Canal, and was a younger brother of engineer Charles Baird.

In 1799 he was a Burgess of Glasgow town council and is listed with his brother as "H & R Baird Enginners" at Hamilton Hill on the Old Canal Basin.

His father, Nicol Baird died in 1807, and Hugh Baird succeeded him as surveyor to the canal. In 1810 he put forward designs for extending Grangemouth docks, although nothing was built. Baird was appointed resident engineer to the Forth and Clyde Canal in 1812, on a salary of £250 a year.

In 1813, Baird was commissioned to prepare a scheme for linking Edinburgh to the Forth and Clyde Canal, via an "arm", or branch canal, between Falkirk and Fountainbridge, Edinburgh. Alternative designs included schemes by John Rennie and Robert Stevenson, as well as earlier proposals by Ainslie and Whitworth (1797). Thomas Telford supported Baird's proposal in 1815, and an act of Parliament was passed two years later. Baird was appointed chief engineer to the new canal, which became the Union Canal, on a salary of £500 a year. The canal was begun in March 1818 and was opened in May 1822. Although the canal had only one flight of locks, at Falkirk (since replaced by the Falkirk Wheel), it was necessary to construct three substantial aqueducts; the Avon Aqueduct, the Almond Aqueduct and the Slateford Aqueduct. These were designed by Baird with Telford's advice, and are modelled on Telford's Chirk Aqueduct on the Ellesmere Canal. The canal also includes Scotland's only canal tunnel, at Falkirk, 630 metres (2,070 ft) long.

Hugh Baird was also involved with the Crinan Canal in Argyll, and the Ulverston Canal in Cumbria. He died at Kelvinhead, and was buried at Kilsyth. Baird Road in Ratho, Edinburgh was named after Hugh Baird. His son, Nicol Hugh Baird (1796–1849), emigrated to Canada, where he worked on a number of canal projects.

== Artistic recognition ==
He was portrayed by Daniel Macnee RSA.

== See also ==
- Canals of the United Kingdom
- History of the British canal system
