= Avon Viaduct, Linlithgow =

Bridge in Falkirk, Scotland

Avon Viaduct
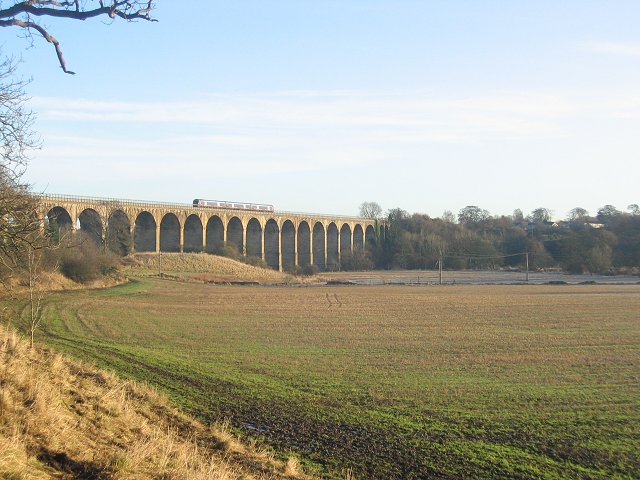
- Coordinates: 55.97458°N 3.63189°W
- Carries: Edinburgh and Glasgow Railway
- Crosses: River Avon
- Locale: Linlithgow

Characteristics
- No. of spans: 23

History
- Designer: John Miller
- Built: 1841

Listed Building – Category A
- Official name: Avon Viaduct
- Designated: 24 October 1972
- Reference no.: LB15326

Location
- Interactive map of Avon Viaduct

The Avon Viaduct is a railway viaduct near Linlithgow, in West Lothian, Scotland (west of Edinburgh). Completed in 1841, it spans the River Avon just to the west of town.

== Design ==
The Avon Viaduct consists of 20 segmental arches, each with a span of 50 feet (15 metres), along with three smaller, round-headed, approach arches on eastern side, all in dressed cream sandstone. It crosses the River Avon (Falkirk) and a minor road (the B825) It reaches a height of 70 feet (21 metres) above the river and is 442 yards (404 metres) long. It has prominent impost bands, resembling cornices, from which the arches spring, string courses above the arch crowns, and terminates in a low brick parapet. The engineer, John Miller, built many of his viaducts with hollow spandrels which later required reinforcement. On the Avon Viaduct, the reinforcement was done with radial bracing made from former rails. In the 1960s, the spandrels were filled with concrete.

== History ==
Miller built the viaduct for the Edinburgh and Glasgow Railway. Work took place from 1839 to 1841. It remains in use, carrying the Glasgow–Edinburgh via Falkirk line.

The viaduct is a Category A listed building, first listed in 1971, and a scheduled monument. Both statuses provide legal protection. It straddles the border between the West Lothian and Falkirk Council areas, so has two Historic Environment Scotland listings.

In August 2026, Network Rail started work on a project to renovate the viaduct. The work was to include repairs to the masonry, repainting the steelwork, structural engineering work and replacing the metal parapet handrails with glass-reinforced polymer (GRP). The work was expected to be completed in May 2027 at a cost of £3.6 million.

There is another Avon Viaduct located 4 miles (6.4 km) south-west of Linlithgow; this Category B listed structure was built c. 1850 for the Monkland Railways and is now disused. To distinguish it from the older viaduct it is usually referred to by the alternative name of Westfield Viaduct.

== See also ==
- List of Category A listed buildings in Falkirk
- List of listed buildings in Muiravonside, Falkirk
- List of railway bridges and viaducts in the United Kingdom
