= List of listed buildings in Muiravonside, Falkirk =

This is a list of listed buildings in the parish of Muiravonside in Falkirk, Scotland.

== List ==
Name	Location	Date Listed	Grid Ref. (Note: Sometimes known as OSGB36, the grid reference (where provided) is based on the British national grid reference system used by the Ordnance Survey. • "Guide to National Grid". Ordnance Survey. • "Get-a-map". Ordnance Survey.)	Geo-coordinates	Notes	LB Number (Note: Historic Environment Scotland assign a unique alphanumeric identifier to each designated site in Scotland, for listed buildings this always begins with "LB", for example "LB12345".)	Image
Lathallan House, Ivy Cottage				55°58′59″N 3°40′46″W	Category C(S)	49524	Upload Photo
Linlithgow Bridge, Glenavon House				55°58′43″N 3°37′58″W	Category B	50804	Upload another image
Dovecot, Muiravonside House				55°57′36″N 3°39′31″W	Category B	15322	Upload another image
Manuel Nunnery				55°58′11″N 3°38′56″W	Category B	13848	Upload Photo
Vellore House				55°58′19″N 3°41′03″W	Category B	19204	Upload Photo
Cottages And Public House, Linlithgow Bridge				55°58′37″N 3°37′53″W	Category B	15325	Upload Photo
Compston				55°57′54″N 3°40′17″W	Category C(S)	15327	Upload Photo
Lathallan House, Power House				55°59′02″N 3°40′33″W	Category B	49526	Upload another image
Avon Viaduct				55°56′07″N 3°42′32″W	Category A	15326	Upload another image See more images
Canal Bridge Near Causewayend				55°57′58″N 3°39′48″W	Category C(S)	15319	Upload Photo
Avon Aqueduct				55°57′51″N 3°39′22″W	Category A	15321	Upload another image See more images
Candie House				55°56′57″N 3°42′24″W	Category B	15323	Upload Photo
Lathallan House				55°59′00″N 3°40′48″W	Category B	49523	Upload another image See more images
Manuel House				55°58′04″N 3°39′13″W	Category B	19392	Upload Photo
Parish Church Muiravonside				55°58′27″N 3°40′29″W	Category B	15313	Upload Photo
Almond Castle				55°58′38″N 3°40′25″W	Category B	15314	Upload another image
The Haining (Formerly Parkhall)				55°58′34″N 3°41′18″W	Category B	15315	Upload Photo
House, Manuel Mill				55°58′05″N 3°39′03″W	Category B	15320	Upload Photo
Railway Viaduct Avonbank				55°59′20″N 3°39′24″W	Category B	15329	Upload another image
Lathallan House, Walled Garden				55°59′00″N 3°40′36″W	Category B	49525	Upload Photo
Manuel Mill				55°58′03″N 3°39′03″W	Category B	19264	Upload Photo
Torphichen Bridge				55°56′38″N 3°40′31″W	Category C(S)	15324	Upload Photo
Westfield Railway Viaduct				55°56′07″N 3°42′32″W	Category B	15328	Upload another image See more images

== Key ==
The scheme for classifying buildings in Scotland is:

- Category A: "buildings of national or international importance, either architectural or historic; or fine, little-altered examples of some particular period, style or building type."
- Category B: "buildings of regional or more than local importance; or major examples of some particular period, style or building type, which may have been altered."
- Category C: "buildings of local importance; lesser examples of any period, style, or building type, as originally constructed or moderately altered; and simple traditional buildings which group well with other listed buildings."

In March 2016 there were 47,288 listed buildings in Scotland. Of these, 8% were Category A, and 50% were Category B, with the remaining 42% being Category C.

== See also ==
- List of listed buildings in Falkirk (council area)
