= Upperton, North Lanarkshire =

Village in North Lanarkshire, Scotland

Coordinates: 55.919°N 3.912°W

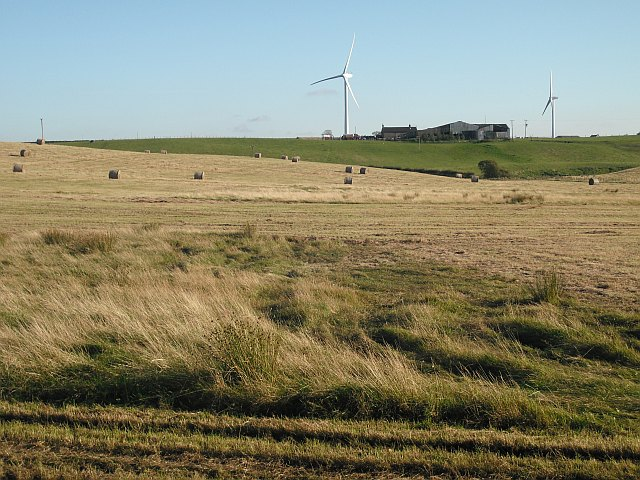
Upperton Farm

Upperton is a village in North Lanarkshire, Scotland, near Airdrie and Cumbernauld, about 20 miles (32 km) north-east of Glasgow. It lies close to the B803 between Greengairs and Slamannan. Other nearby roads include Hulks Road towards the A73, Fannyside Road to Abronhill and the road to Caldercruix via Longriggend. The Avon Water flows through the village and meets the Shielhill Burn, a tributary of the River Avon, just outside the village. William Forrest's 1816 map of Lanarkshire shows the site as Upper Town. The Ordnance Survey map sites "Uppertown" on Shiel Hill.

== Longriggend Fever Hospital and Remand Institution ==
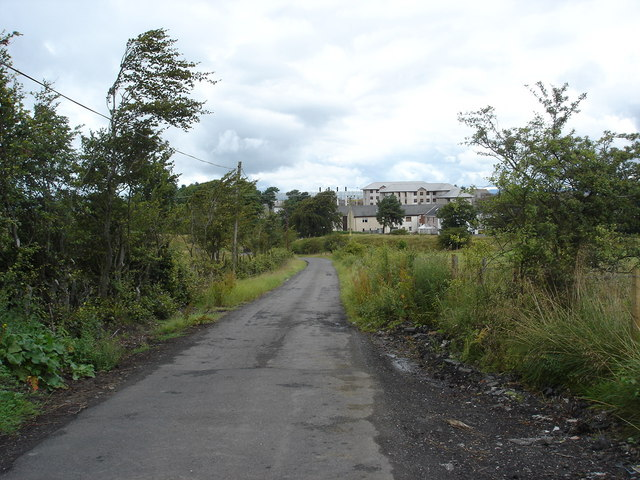
Looking towards former Prison

Upperton was formerly a part the neighbouring village of Longriggend and a tuberculosis sanitorium was built in the village. The hospital was converted into Longriggend Remand Institution which has now been closed and demolished.

== Today's Village ==
Maintenance disputes between the Scottish Prison Service and North Lanarkshire Council have left residents angry about the neglect of the infrastructure around the 80 or so houses and flats built in the 1960s to house prison staff. A dilapidated Upperton flat made the BBC news as it was listed in an online auction for £1 although it eventually sold for £20,000.

== Wind farm ==
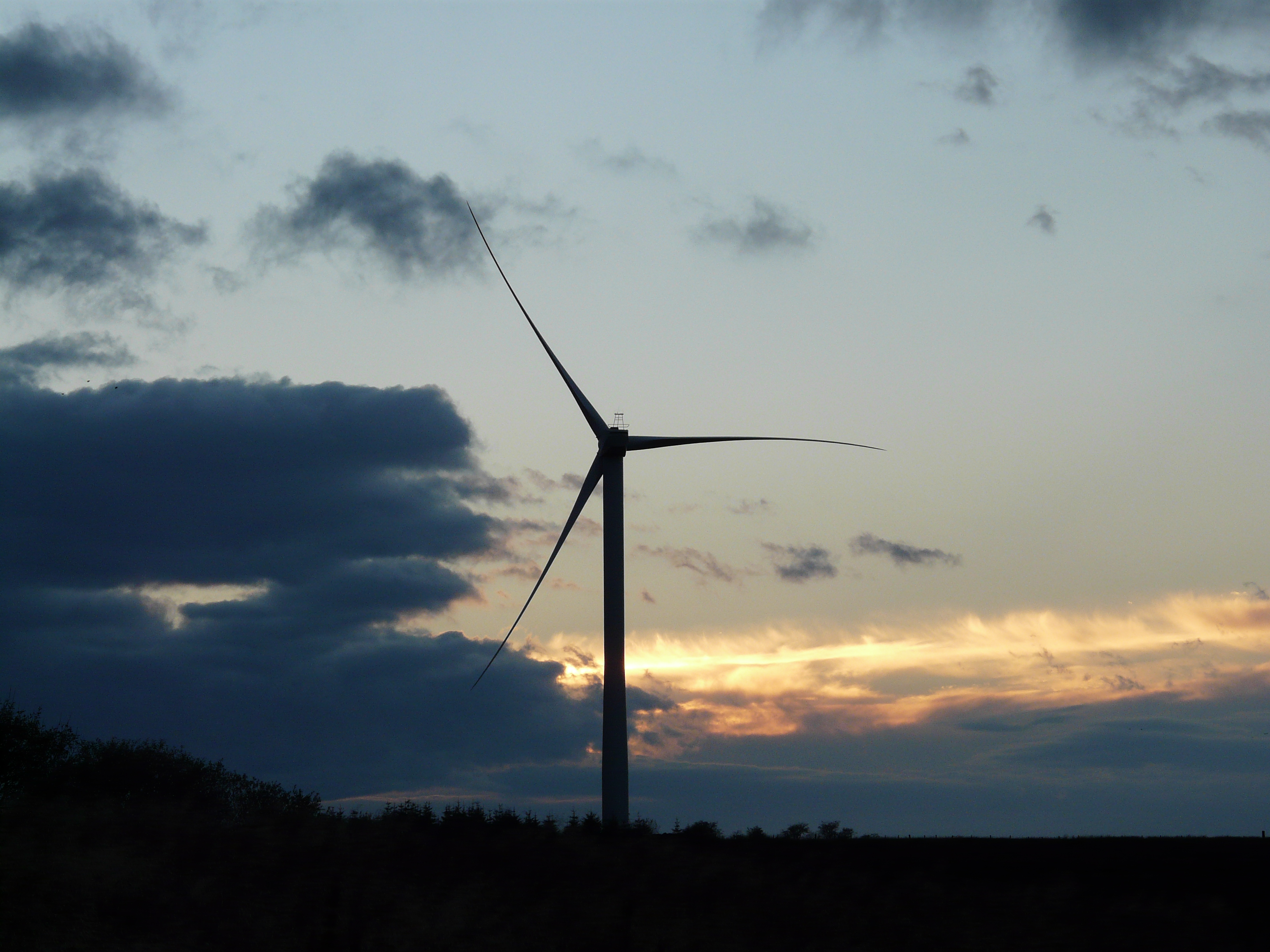
Wind turbine at Greendykeside, near Upperton

The construction of a 9 turbine wind farm was completed in 2024 on the outskirts of the village at Greendykeside, near Longriggend.

== Transportation ==
Upperton has a bus connection with Airdrie.
