= Avon Aqueduct =

Bridge in Falkirk, Scotland

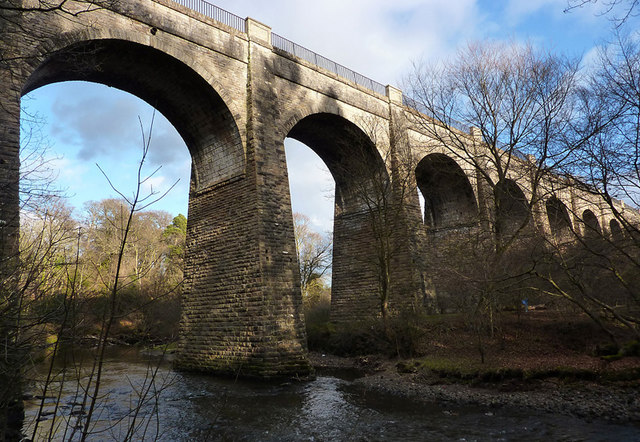
- Bridge across the River Avon
- Coordinates: 55.964167°N 3.656111°W
- Carries: Union Canal
- Crosses: River Avon
- Locale: Falkirk

Characteristics
- Total length: 810 feet (250 m)
- Height: 86 feet (26 m)
- Longest span: 50 feet (15 m)
- No. of spans: 12

History
- Designer: Hugh Baird

Listed Building – Category A
- Official name: Avon Aqueduct, Edinburgh And Glasgow Union Canal Aqueduct
- Designated: 20 February 1971
- Reference no.: LB7468

Location
- Interactive map of Avon Aqueduct

The Avon Aqueduct is a navigable aqueduct that carries the Union Canal over the River Avon, near Linlithgow, Scotland.

== History ==
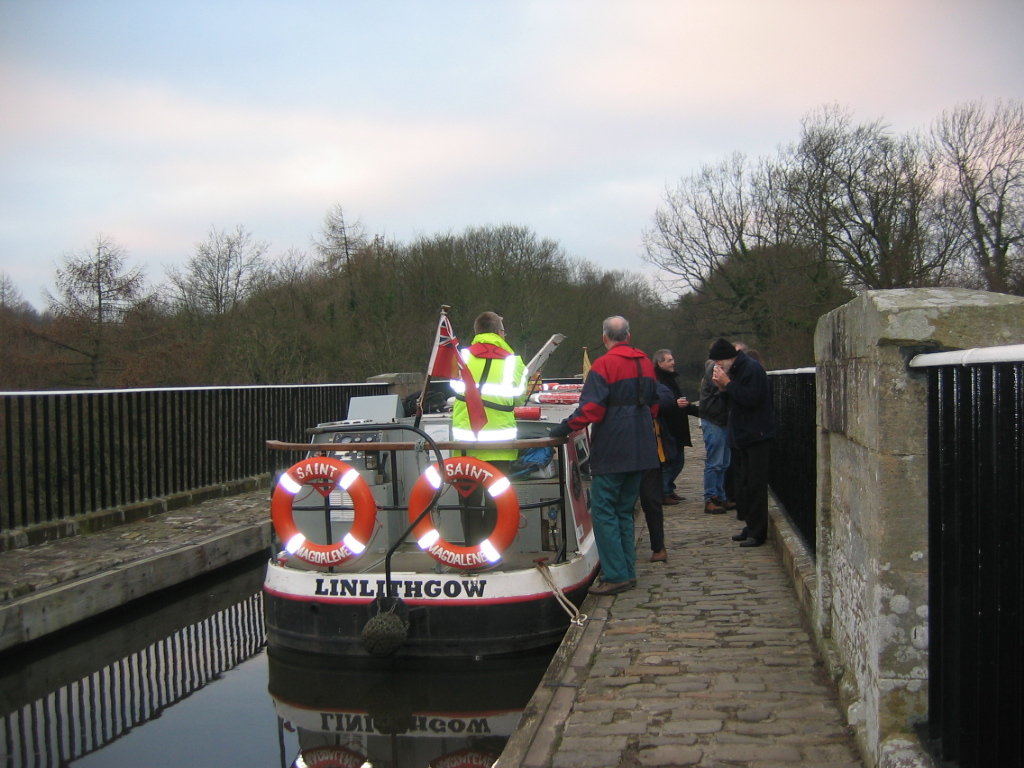
A boat on the aqueduct

The aqueduct was built to a design by Hugh Baird, with advice from Thomas Telford, in tandem with the aqueducts at Slateford and Lin's Mill, with which it shares its design. Telford was not convinced that the stone arches were necessary in conjunction with the iron trough, but Baird used both on all three major aqueducts. Construction was carried out by Messrs. Craven, Whitaker and Nowell between 1819 and 1821, their success in building a stone bridge over the River Ouse making their tender for the contract "by far the most eligible".

The aqueduct straddles the border between the West Lothian and Falkirk Council areas, so has two Historic Environment Scotland listings. The aqueduct is a category A listed building.

== Design ==
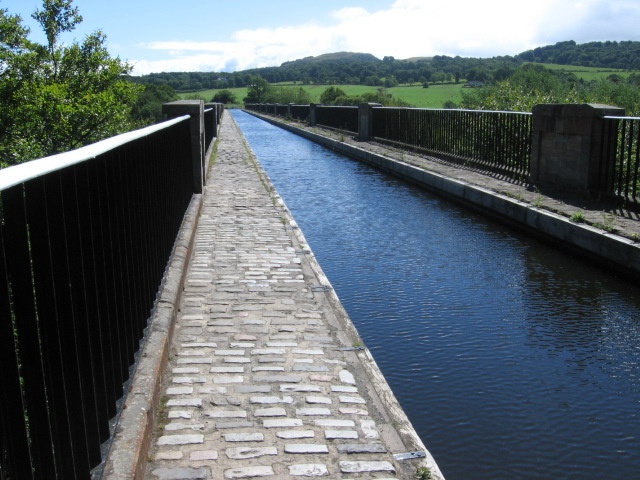
The view from the towpath

The Barton Aqueduct of 1761, and subsequent canal aqueducts in the United Kingdom, used large quantities of masonry and puddling to obtain watertightness. After the success of The Iron Bridge in 1789, however, cast iron was used by Telford on aqueducts such as Chirk and Pontcysyllte. Aqueducts built in the early part of the 19th century use either puddle clay or an iron trough in no particular pattern. The Avon Aqueduct uses an iron trough to achieve watertightness, as well as containing the outward pressure of the water, allowing it to be of more slender construction than a purely stone aqueduct such as the Kelvin Aqueduct.

It is just over 810 feet (250 m) long including the tapered part of the canal at each end, and 86 feet (26 m) high above the surface of the river. The aqueduct is carried on twelve segmental arches, each of 50 feet (15 m) span. The piers, which are slightly tapered, spring into the arches at a height of 50 feet (15 m) above the river level, and the tops of the arches are 50 feet (15 m) above that point. The piers are hollow, and access to the inside of the structure underneath the trough is gained by a small door 3 feet (0.91 m) high by 2 feet 6 inches (0.76 m) wide. The structure is 23 feet 8 inches (7.21 m) wide at the top, and the canal is 13 feet (4.0 m) wide and around 6 feet (1.8 m) deep due to silting. There are stone towpaths 4 feet (1.2 m) wide along each side.

It is the longest and tallest aqueduct in Scotland, and the second longest in Britain, after the Pontcysyllte Aqueduct in Wales.

== See also ==
- List of canal aqueducts in Great Britain
- List of Category A listed buildings in Falkirk
- List of listed buildings in Muiravonside, Falkirk
