= Bonington =

Bonington may refer to:

== People with the surname ==
- Chris Bonington (born 1934), British mountaineer
- Richard Parkes Bonington (1802–1828), British landscape painter

== Other uses ==
- Bonington Halls, University of Nottingham, England
- Sutton Bonington, village in Nottinghamshire, England

== See also ==
- Portrait of Richard Parkes Bonington, a portrait painting by Margaret Sarah Carpenter
- Bonnington (disambiguation)
