= Longriggend =

Village in North Lanarkshire, Scotland

Coordinates: 55.9097°N 3.8852°W

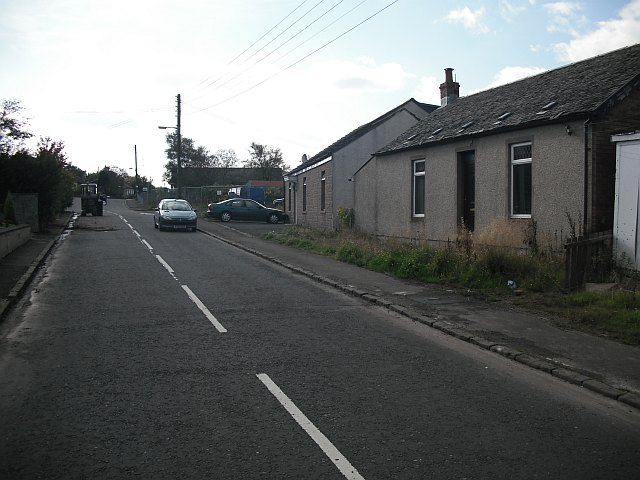
Main Street, Longriggend

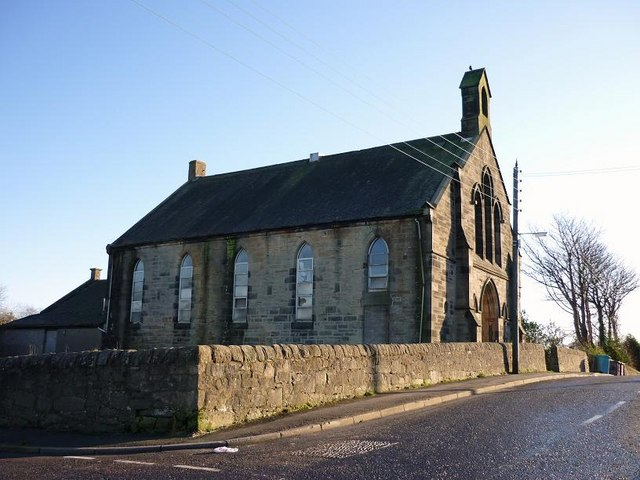
Derelict Church, Longriggend

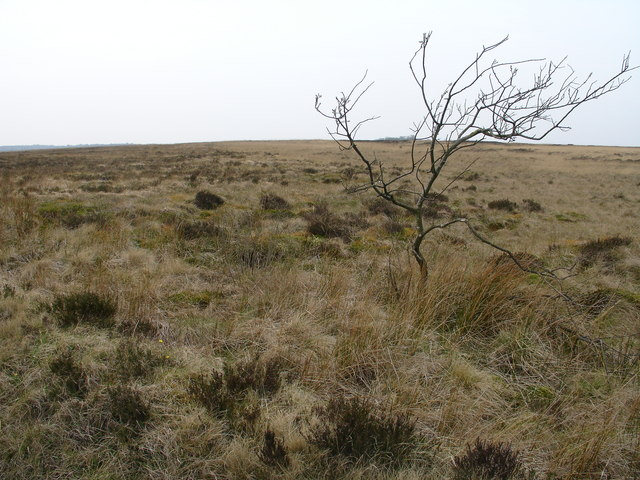
Moor at Longriggend

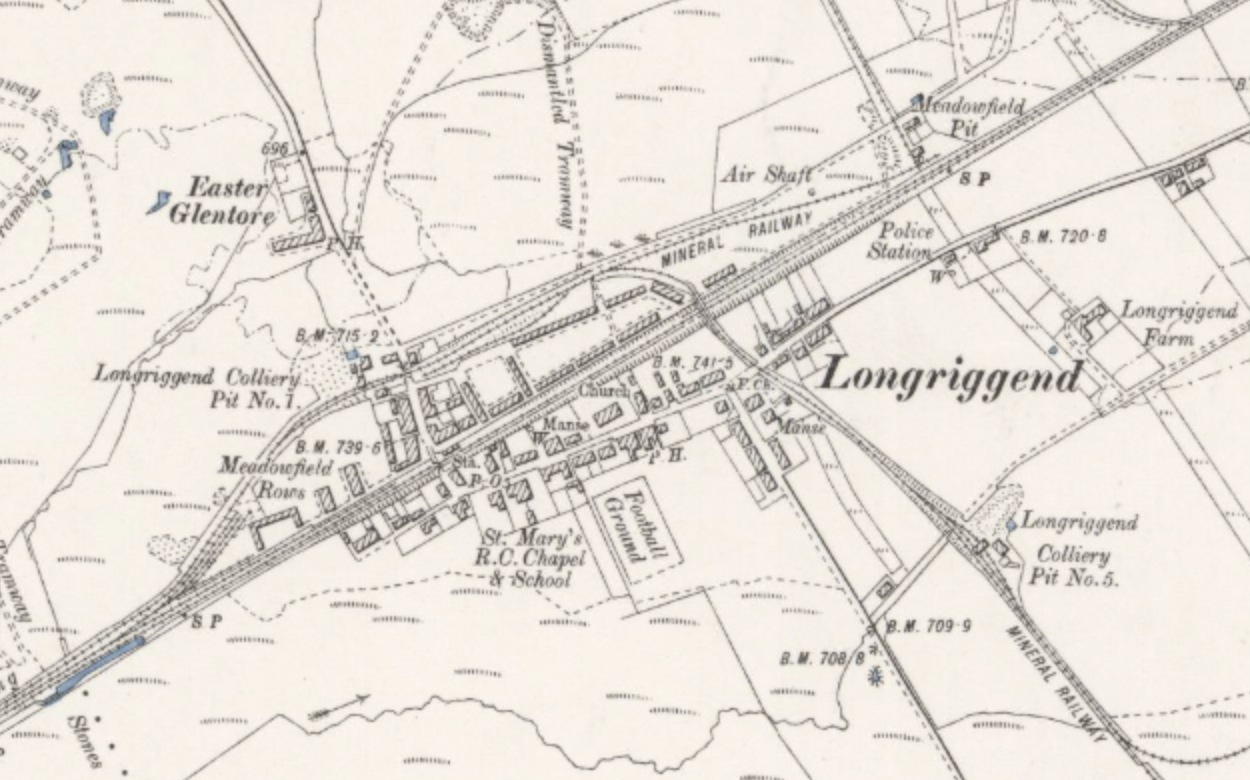
Lanarkshire Sheet III.SE 1896 extract, showing Longriggend and the location of the football ground

Longriggend is a village in North Lanarkshire, Scotland, with a population of approximately 200.

== Geography ==
It is situated on moorland 8 km north-east of Airdrie, in the parish of New Monkland. It is roughly halfway between Upperton and Caldercruix.

== History ==
The village appeared on a map by Timothy Pont, under the name of Langrodge. It was published in 1596 but the letters are difficult to read. The toponymy is listed along with other -rigg placenames. Longriggend is also shown on another map by Roy c1754. Slamannan Railway joined Longriggend with Airdrie and the Union Canal in 1840, but its gauge prevented its connection with the Edinburgh & Glasgow Railway. Coal pits in the area used the railway extensively, and by 1895 there was a station at Longriggend. By 1901 its population had reached over 1500, and it had a post and telegraph office, and an inn nearby.

== Education ==
The Ordnance Survey in 1867 recorded a Roman Catholic school in the village.

== Sport ==
The village hosted a senior football club, Longriggend F.C., between 1897 and 1902. Its greatest honour was winning the Coatbridge Express Cup in 1897–98, beating Albion Rovers in the final.

== Longriggend Fever Hospital and Remand Institution ==
Historically, there was a tuberculosis sanitorium in the part of the village now known as Upperton. The hospital was converted into Longriggend Remand Institution which has now been closed and demolished.

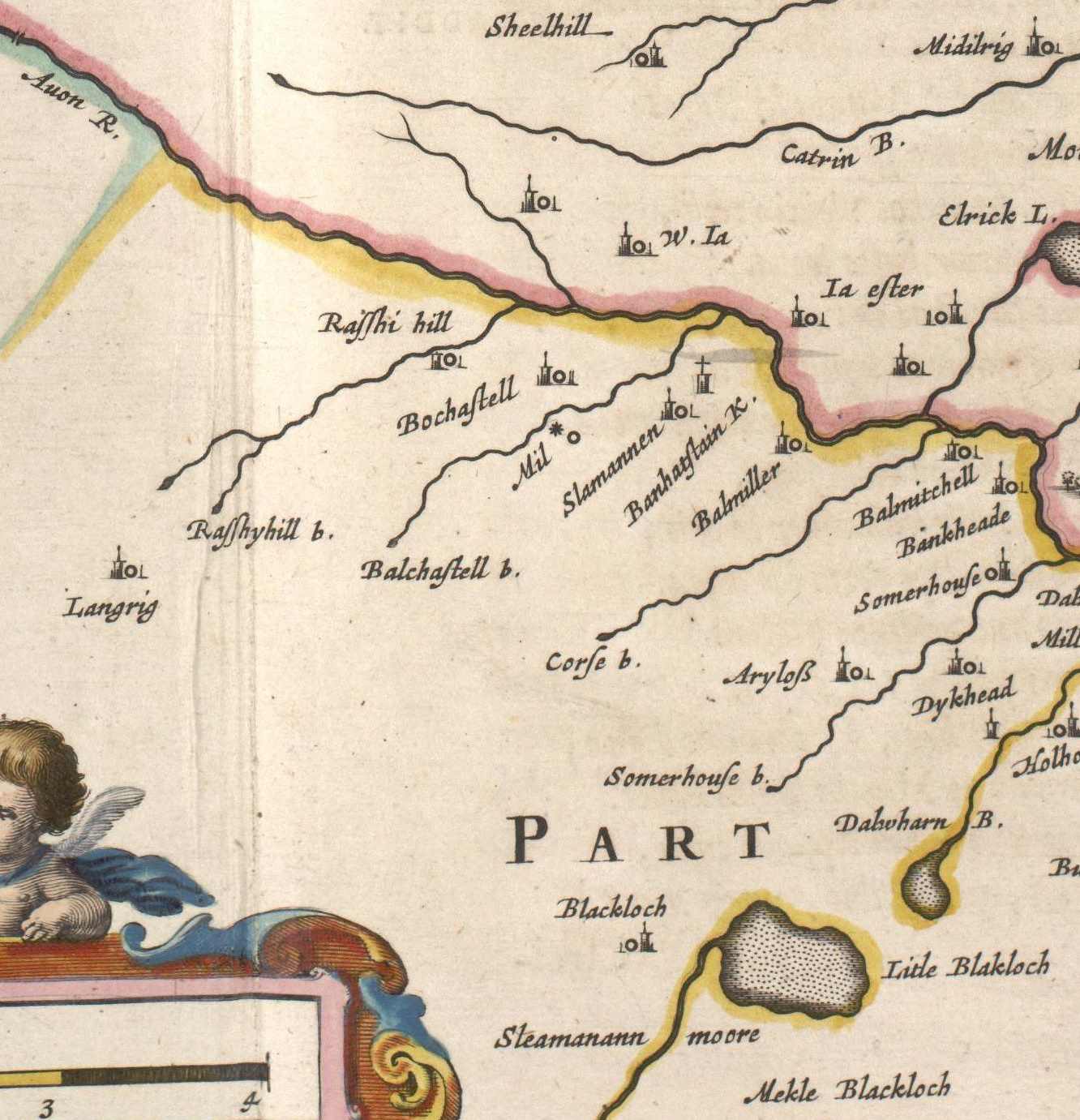
Blaeu's map from 1654 based on Pont's original c.1596 "The East Central Lowlands (Stirling, Falkirk & Kilsyth) - Pont 32" map depicting Langrig west of Slamannenn

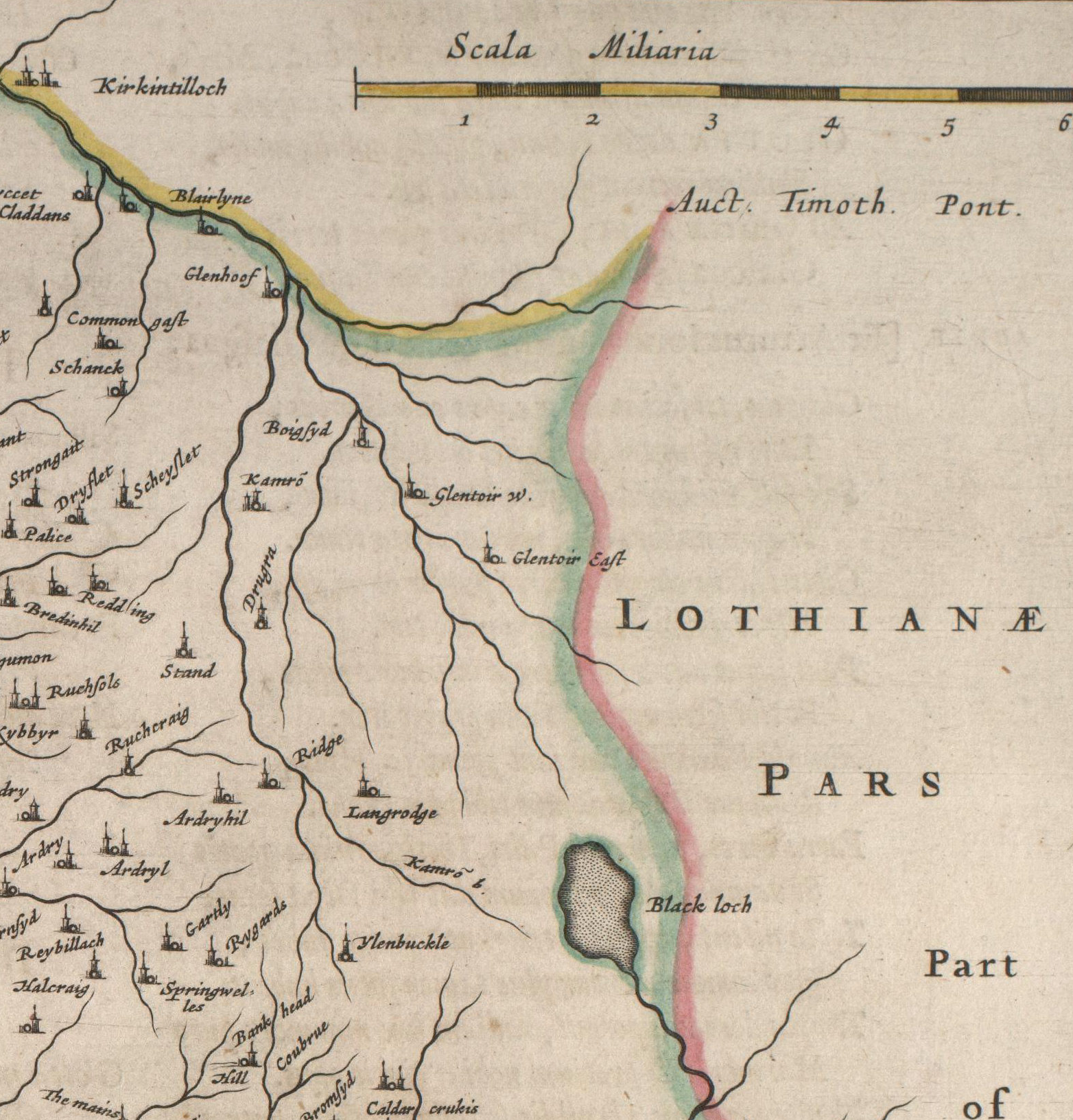
Longriggend from Blaeu's map based on Pont's original It is near the top right of the map and Langrodge is about three squares left of the Black Loch.
