= Bonnington Falls, British Columbia =

Coordinates: 49°28′00″N 117°29′00″W

Bonnington Falls is a community on the north side of the Kootenay River between the cities of Castlegar and Nelson, in the West Kootenay region of southern British Columbia. It was named after the adjacent Bonnington Falls, now submerged by hydro dams.

Upstream about one mile from this former Canadian Pacific Railway flag stop was the former Miles Ferry flag stop. During the construction of the hydro dam on the upper falls, John (Paddy) Miles operated a rowboat across the river. While rowing two passengers in May 1908, the boat was swept over the Bonnington Falls, but only one body was ever recovered.
