= Bonnington Falls =

Waterfalls in British Columbia, Canada

Coordinates: 49°28′00″N 117°29′00″W

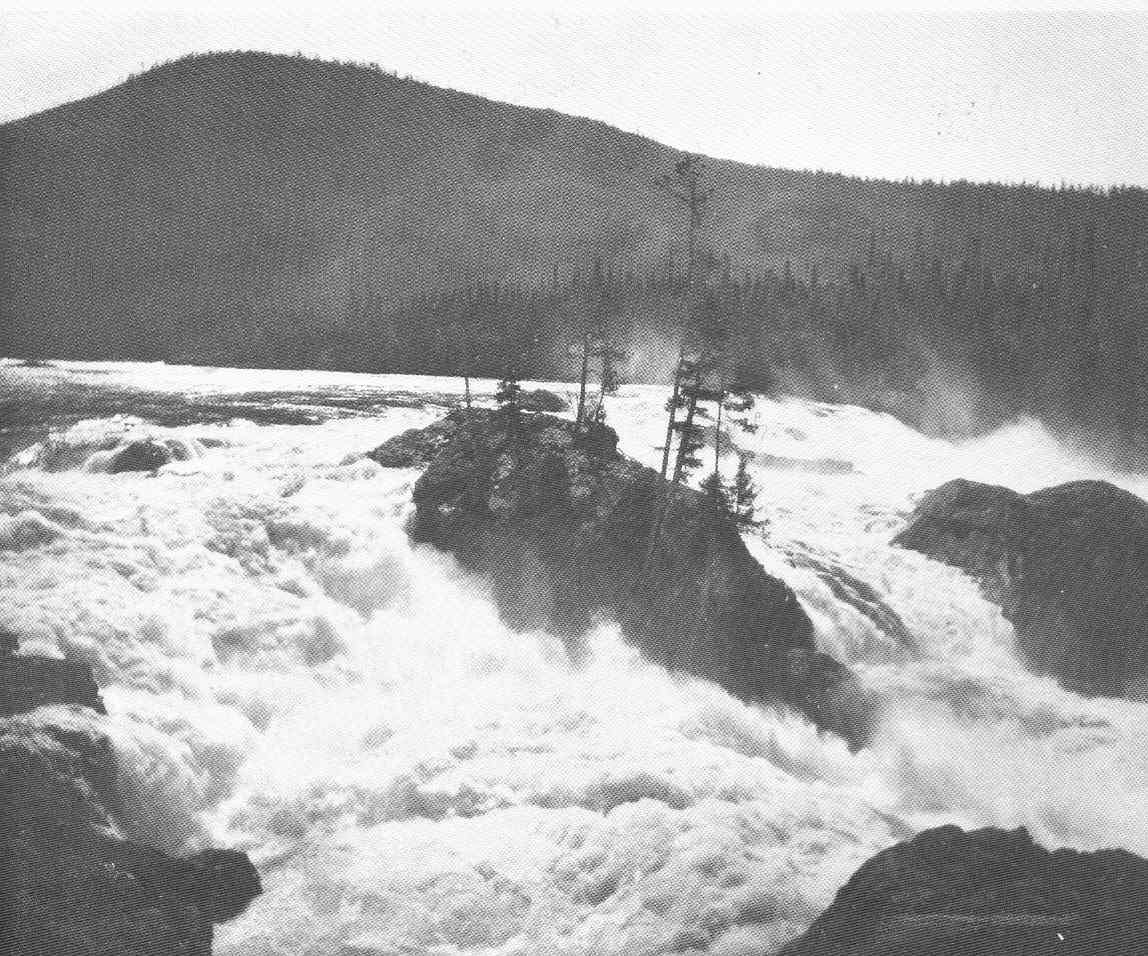
The upper part of Bonnington Falls before dam construction circa 1908

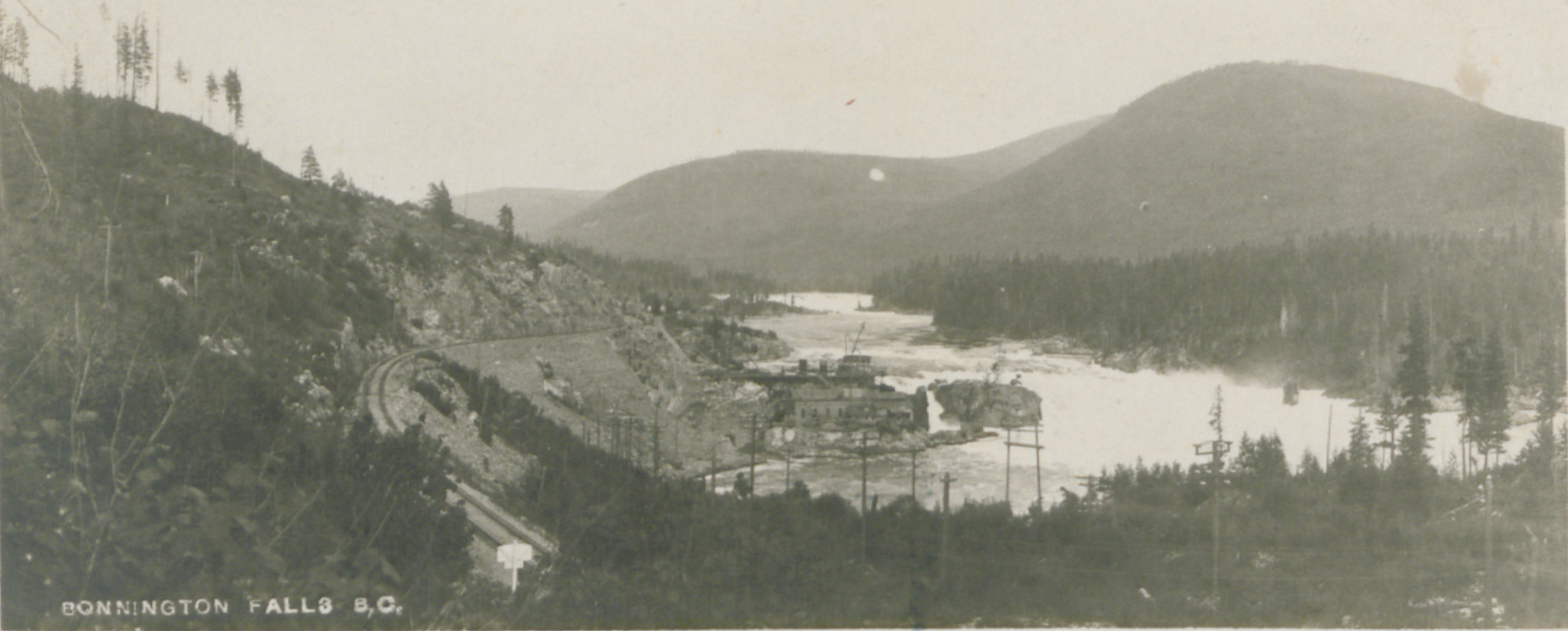
Bonnington Falls before dam construction circa 1909

Bonnington Falls were waterfalls submerged by dams on the Kootenay River between the cities of Castlegar and Nelson, in the West Kootenay region of southern British Columbia, Canada. The upper falls was named after the Falls of Clyde upper falls of Bonnington Linn.

In 1896, West Kootenay Power and Light constructed a dam and hydro generating station at the lower falls. At the time, the 51 kilometres (32 mi) high voltage line to the Rossland mines was the longest in the world. In 1908, the City of Nelson hydro dam at the upper falls became operational. In 1976, BC Hydro completed a dam on the Kootenay Canal diversion.

Adjacent to the site of the falls is the unincorporated community of Bonnington Falls, British Columbia.

== See also ==
- List of waterfalls in British Columbia
