= Bonnington Aqueduct =

Bridge in Edinburgh, Scotland

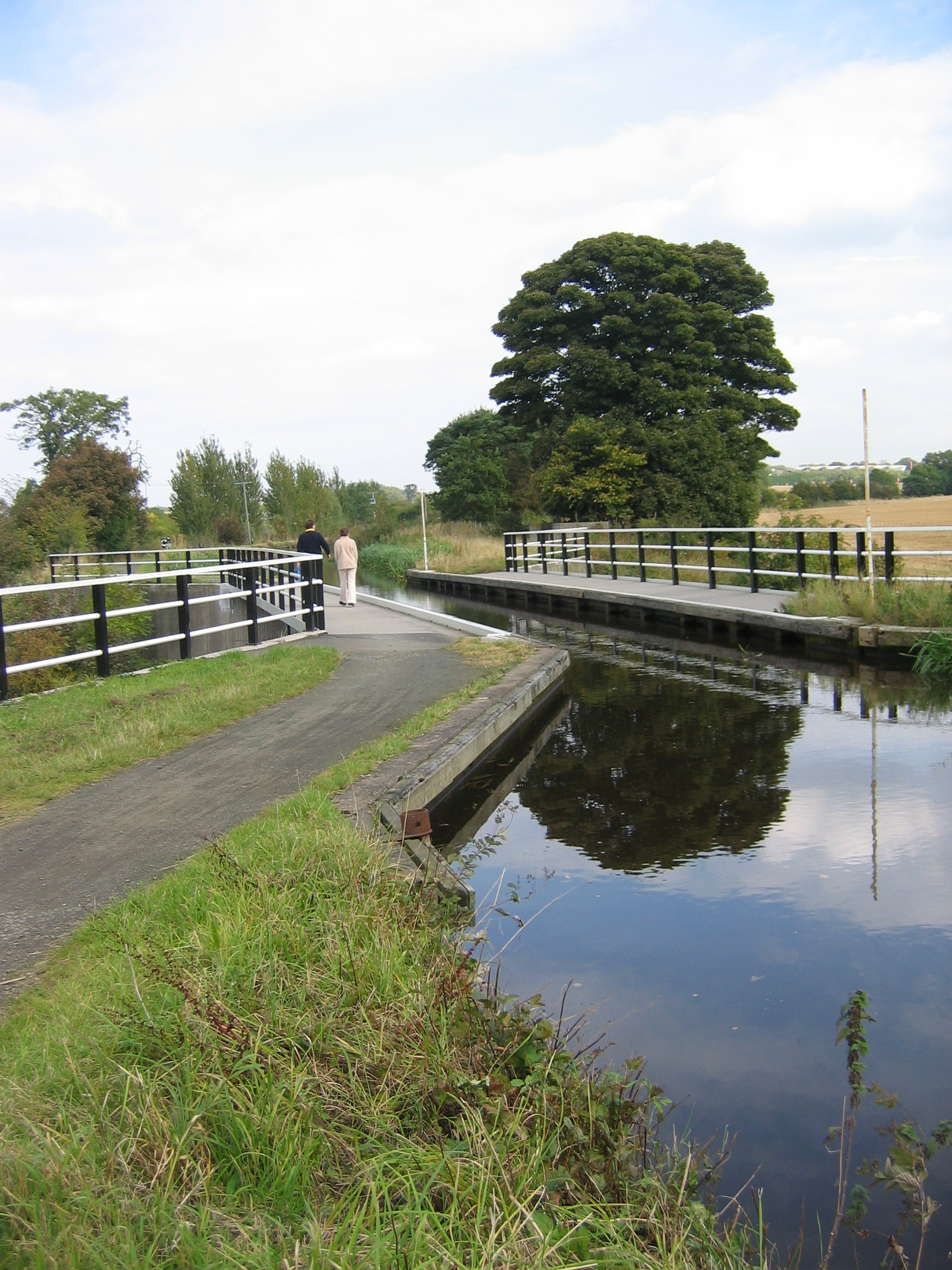
- Bonnington Aqueduct viewed from the level of the canal
- Coordinates: 55.9244°N 3.4144°W
- OS grid reference: NT117710
- Carries: Union Canal
- Crosses: B7030 Cliftonhall Road
- Locale: Edinburgh; West Lothian

Location
- Interactive map of Bonnington Aqueduct

The Bonnington Aqueduct is an aqueduct on the Union Canal, to the west of Edinburgh, Scotland.

== History ==
The original aqueduct was 10 feet (3.0 m) in diameter. The present aqueduct is a concrete replacement, opened in 1978 to allow the road beneath to be widened.

== Design ==
The canal and the roughly parallel M8 motorway pass over the B7030 Cliftonhall Road. The aqueduct is only the width of a single boat, meaning that boats may have to wait to pass. Just to the east of the aqueduct, the canal broadens and there is an island with a bird shelter.

On the canal, the aqueduct is located between Bridge 15 (Ratho Bridge) and Bridge 16 (Nellfield Bridge).

The aqueduct is named after the village of Bonnington to the south, near the border with West Lothian.

== See also ==
- List of bridges in Scotland
