= Kelvin Aqueduct =

Aqueduct in Glasgow, Scotland

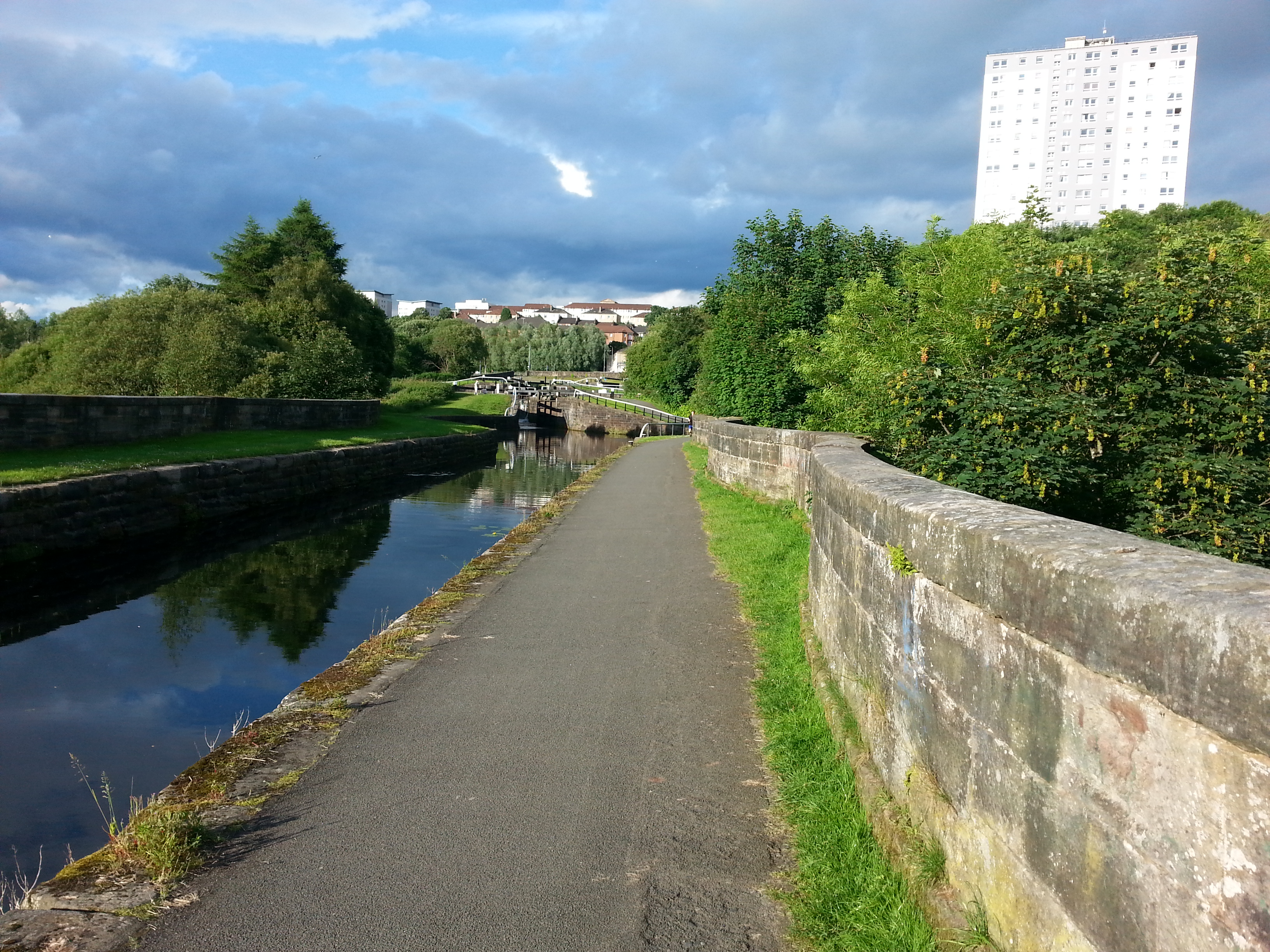
- The Forth and Clyde Canal passing over the Kelvin Aqueduct
- Coordinates: 55.89240°N 4.30179°W
- Carries: Forth and Clyde Canal
- Crosses: River Kelvin
- Locale: Glasgow

Characteristics
- Material: Stone
- Longest span: 50 feet (15 m)
- No. of spans: 4

History
- Construction end: 1787
- Construction cost: £8,509
- Opened: 1790

Listed Building – Category A
- Official name: Forth And Clyde Canal Aqueduct (adjoining Skaethorn Road Bridge)
- Designated: 9 July 1989
- Reference no.: LB32316

Location
- Interactive map of Kelvin Aqueduct

The Kelvin Aqueduct is a navigable aqueduct in Glasgow, Scotland, which carries the Forth and Clyde Canal over the River Kelvin.

== History ==
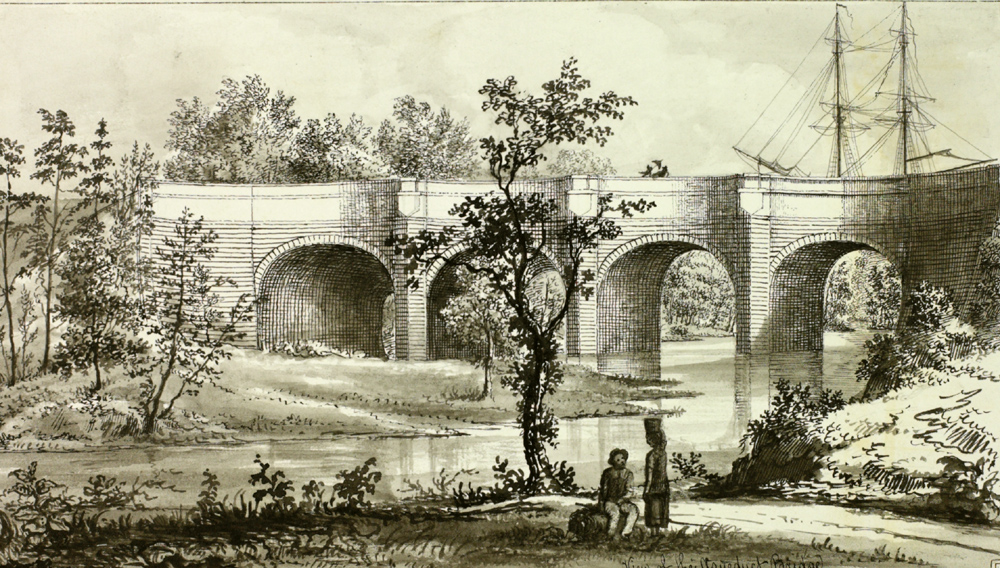
An etching by James Hopkirk of a sailboat crossing the aqueduct

It was designed by Robert Whitworth, one of John Smeaton's supervising engineers on the Forth and Clyde Canal project. The contractors were William Gibb (founder of the engineering dynasty that led to Sir Alexander Gibb & Partners) and John Muir, who also built the nearby Maryhill locks. A foundation stone was laid on 16 June 1787 by Archibald Spiers, the chairman of the canal committee.

When opened in 1790 it was Britain's largest aqueduct, and onlookers were impressed at the sight of sailing boats crossing above them. The entire project cost £8,509, exceeding the original estimated cost of £6,200.

It was protected as a category A listed building in 1989.

== Design ==
It is 445 feet (136 metres) long, with four arches of 50-foot (15 m) span, and 62 feet (19 m) high above the surface of the river. According to measurements by John Rennie as the canal was nearing completion, there was around 3 feet (0.9 m) of puddle clay at the bottom of the canal. The aqueduct was designed to carry a depth of 8 feet (2.4 m) of water.

The piers are buttressed in such a way as to resemble cutwaters, but only one pier sits in the river. The sides of the aqueduct are arched in order to transfer the outward pressure of the water onto the buttresses, an effect which can clearly be seen from above. This design feature is also present on the Luggie Aqueduct at Kirkintilloch, which opened in 1773.

The aqueduct is built from rustic masonry at the lower levels and polished ashlar above. Underneath it is the Kelvin Walkway, which runs through an area of green space around the river.

== See also ==
- List of canal aqueducts in Great Britain
