= River Avon, Falkirk =

Coordinates: 56.01014°N 3.67647°W

Avon
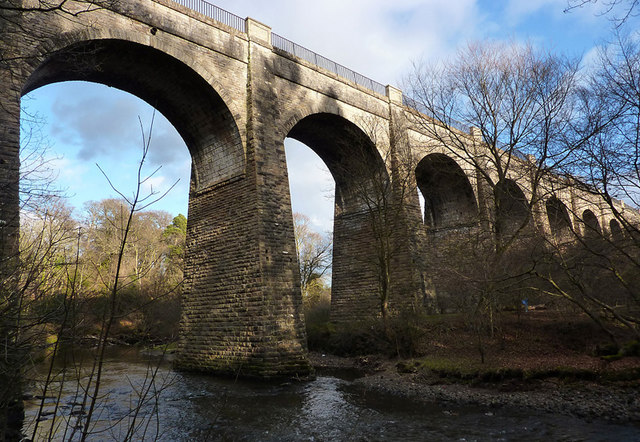
- Aqueduct over the River Avon

Location
- Country: Scotland, United Kingdom
- Region: Falkirk

Physical characteristics
- Source: Avonhead
  - location: Longriggend, North Lanarkshire
- Mouth
  - location: Grangemouth, Falkirk
- Length: 31 km (19 mi)

The Avon is a river largely in the Falkirk council area of Scotland.

== Course ==
It originates, near some wind turbines, at what modern maps call Avonhead Cottage south of Upperton just west of Longriggend. Older maps show it near Avonhead just west of "Avonhead Rows" and north of "Avonhead Coal Pit No 9". Some maps show a stream coming from Fannyside Lochs in North Lanarkshire, some 3 miles (5 km) east of Cumbernauld, but that is not the Avon's source even if some water drains in a rivulet from there. The west of Fannyside Loch is the source of the Glencryan Burn which ends up in the River Carron via the Red Burn and the Bonny Water. Herd's Hill, the source of the Luggie Water which ends up in the River Clyde via the River Kelvin is close by. The first tributary of the Avon is the Shiellhill Burn on the south of Greengairs very close to the source of the Cameron Burn, which itself is a tributary of the Luggie Water.

The Avon picks up the Shiellhill Burn close to Upperton, north of the sewage works and west of Easter Glentore Farm. The Avon crosses Fannyside Road at the Bog Bridge near Toddle Knowe. Within about a kilometre of this point are streams whose waters make it to Linlithgow, Larbert and Kirkintilloch on their way to their destinations. The next tributary is the Garbethill Burn near Jawhills followed by the Rashiehill Burn. The next tributary, near Slamannan, is the Culloch Burn which also starts in Longriggend but takes a more easterly course initially. The Culloch Burn flows anticlockwise round Slamannan and joins the Avon just to the north. After Avonbridge the Lin Mill Burn just after the start of the River Avon Heritage Trail. The next two tributaries are the Logie Water, near Westfield, and the Brunton Burn.

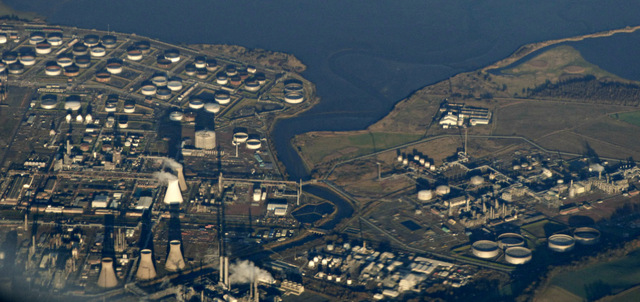
River Avon joins the Firth of Forth at Grangemouth

After Muiravonside Country Park, the other end of the River Avon Heritage Trail, the Bowhouse Burn confluence occurs just before the Avon Aqueduct. This is the tallest aqueduct in Scotland. The Avon Aqueduct—Scotland's longest navigable aqueduct—carries the Union Canal above the river.

The Avon flows under the aqueduct and later under both Linlithgow Bridge and the M9 motorway. The river broadens before it joins the Firth of Forth just east of the Grangemouth Refinery. This is not far down from where the Grange Burn and the River Carron meet the Firth.

The Avon flows through the Avon Gorge and forms the boundary between Falkirk and West Lothian council areas. It is 19 miles (31 km) in length.

== Etymology ==
Like other rivers of this name throughout Britain, the name Avon simply means 'river', derived from Scottish Gaelic abhainn, or British (i.e. Old Welsh) afon.

== See also ==
- Other rivers named River Avon
- List of places in Falkirk council area
