= Slateford Aqueduct =

Aqueduct in Edinburgh, Scotland

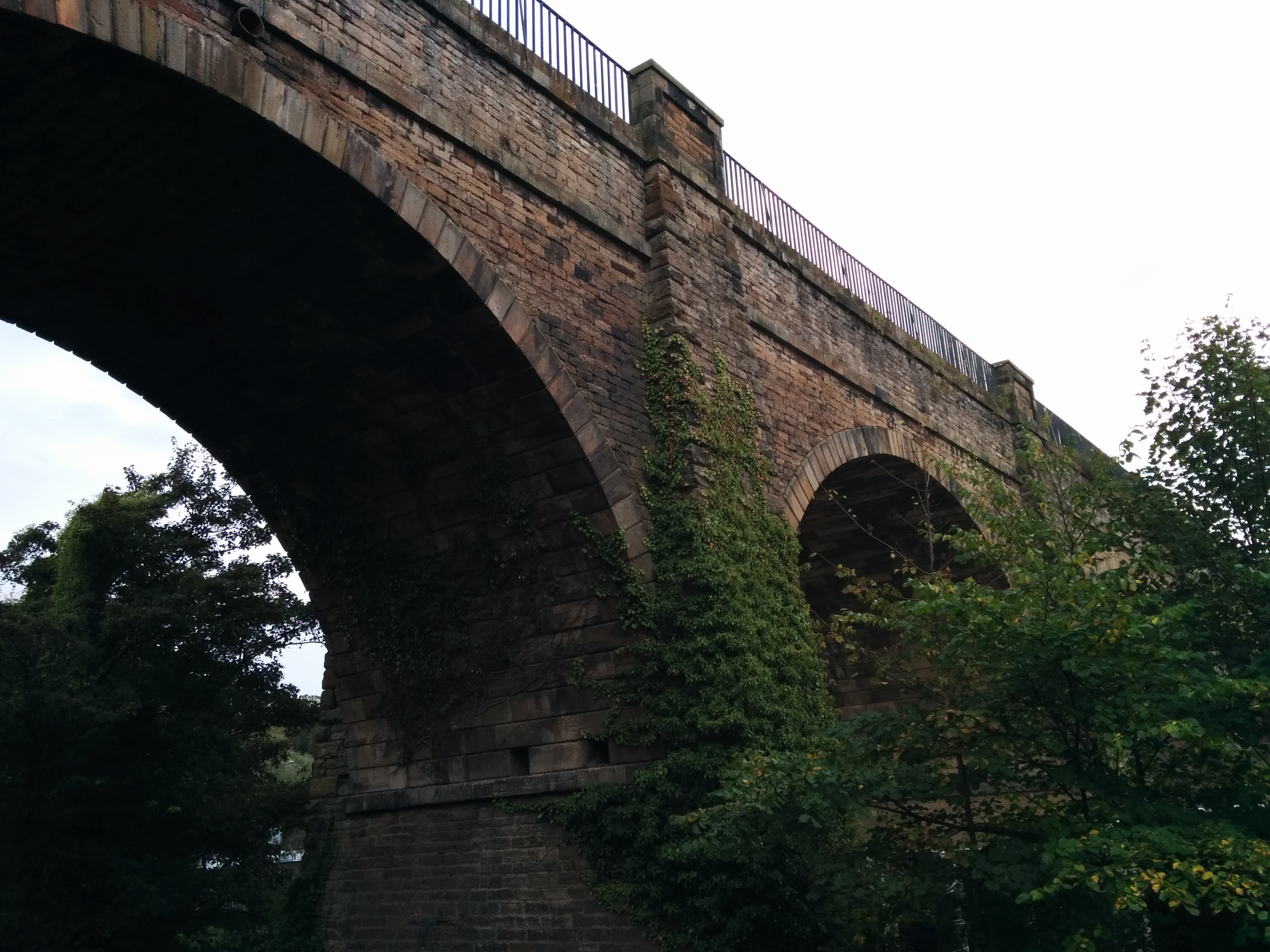
- Bridge in 2014
- Coordinates: 55.923414°N 3.249454°W
- Carries: Union Canal
- Crosses: Water of Leith
- Locale: Edinburgh

Characteristics
- Total length: 500 feet (150 m)
- Height: 75 feet (23 m)
- Longest span: 50 feet (15 m)
- No. of spans: 8

History
- Designer: Hugh Baird; Thomas Telford
- Construction start: 1819
- Construction end: 1822

Listed Building – Category B
- Official name: Union Canal Slateford Aqueduct Over Inglis Green Road And Water Of Leith
- Designated: 13 December 1970
- Reference no.: LB27958

Location
- Interactive map of Slateford Aqueduct

The Slateford Aqueduct is a navigable aqueduct that carries the Union Canal over the Water of Leith at Slateford, Edinburgh, Scotland. Completed in 1822, it has eight arches and spans a length of 500 feet (150 m).

== History ==
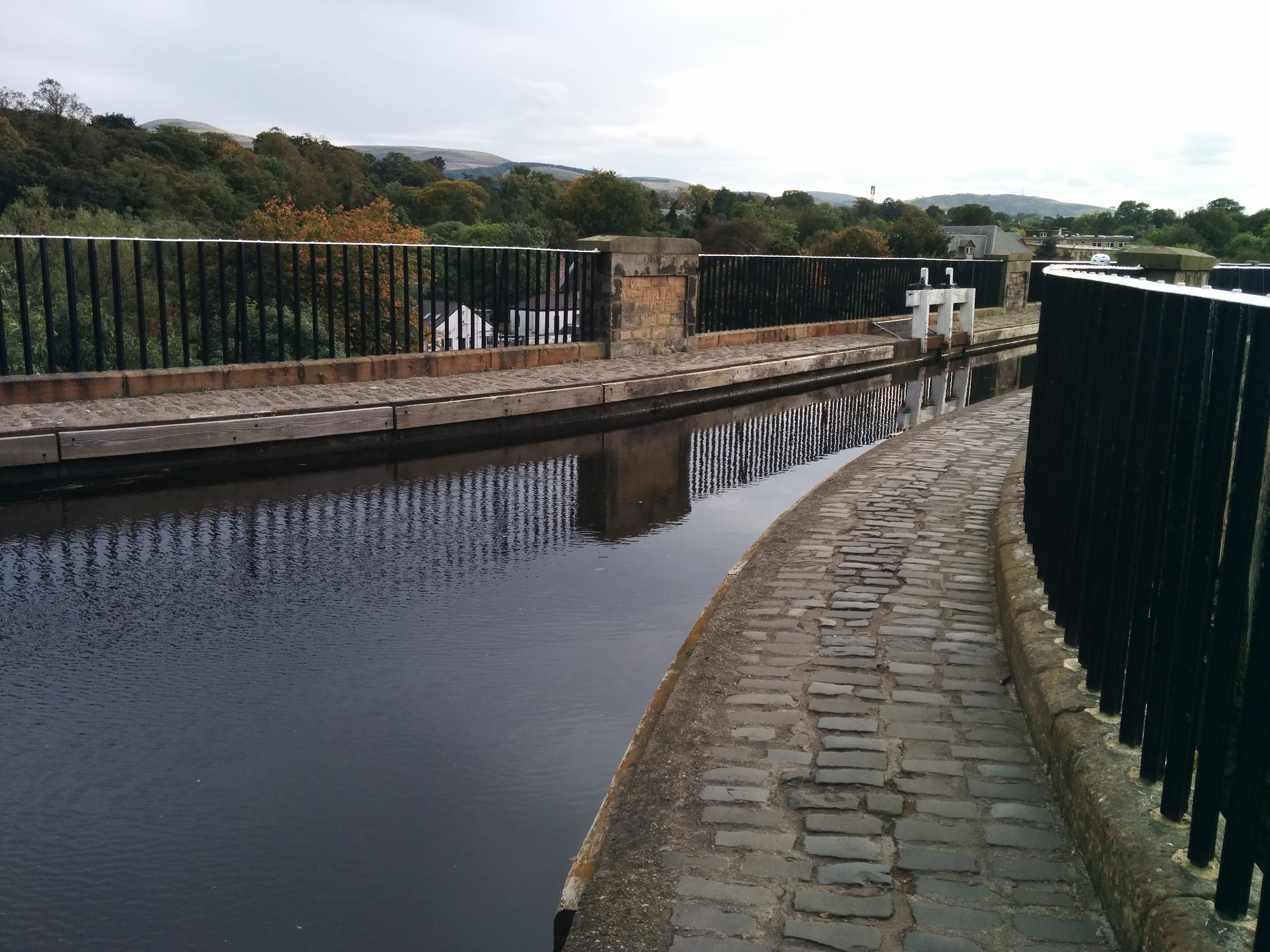
The view from the towpath

It was designed by Hugh Baird with advice from Thomas Telford and is modelled on Telford's Chirk Aqueduct. Different parts of the canal were tendered to contractors at different times, and the masonry for the Slateford Aqueduct was advertised to builders on 2 March 1818. Baird wrote to Telford regarding the ironwork, as he had received a visit from James Thomson, representing the company of William Hazledine, who had worked on the Pontcysyllte Aqueduct. Baird was unsure about using a contractor based so far away, and also as to whether the contract should just be for the delivery of the plates or the delivery and assembly. On 3 April 1818, Hugh McIntosh was chosen to construct the aqueduct, as he was the contractor for the east end of the canal. After Thomson sent an estimate to Telford for the iron on 30 April, a revised specification was chosen by Baird, the contract for which was advertised on 18 July, and tenders opened on 11 August. The offer by the partnership of Messrs. Craven, Whitaker and Nowell, riding on the success of their building a stone bridge over the River Ouse, was accepted as being "by far the most eligible."

Construction had started by March 1819, after the laying of a foundation stone. It lasted until 1822, and the canal opened that year.

It was listed as a category B listed building in 1970.

== Design ==
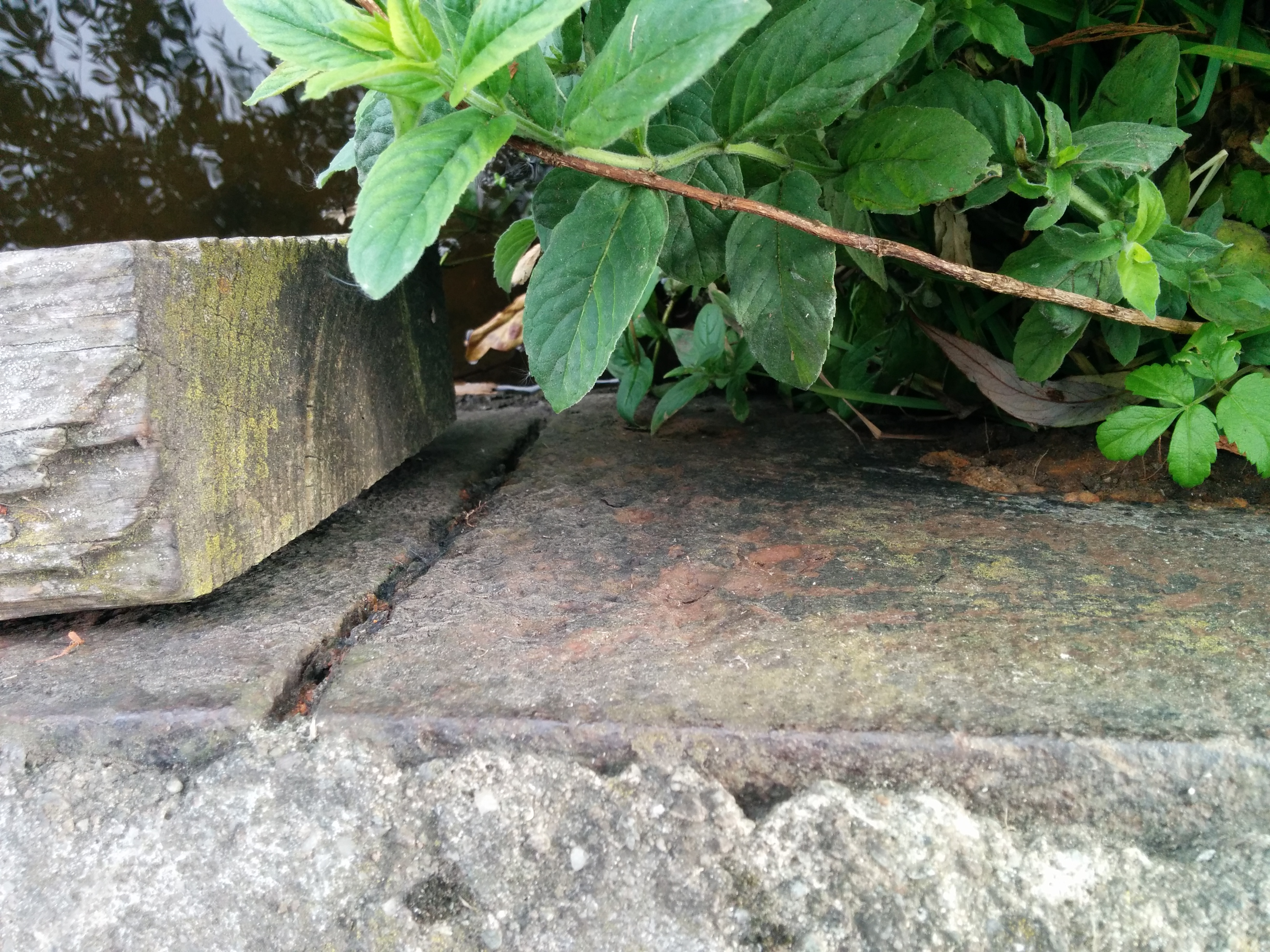
A joint in the iron trough that makes the canal watertight

The Barton Aqueduct of 1761, and subsequent canal aqueducts in the United Kingdom, used large quantities of masonry and puddling to obtain watertightness. After the success of The Iron Bridge in 1789, however, cast iron was used by Telford on aqueducts such as Chirk and Pontcysyllte. Aqueducts built in the early part of the 19th century use either puddle clay or an iron trough in no particular pattern.

The Slateford Aqueduct has eight arches of 50 feet (15 m) span, and is 500 feet (150 m) long and 75 feet (23 m) high above the Water of Leith. The piers are battered, giving a larger footprint at the base than the top, and the spandrels are hollow, an innovation by Telford. The interior of the stone structure is essentially a set of 5/6? stone arches running in parallel along the length of the bridge, linked and braced laterally at the top of each arch. It is possible to walk the length of the bridge inside the stonework on the north side, from access apertures on the abutments. It carries the Union Canal across Inglis Green Road and the Water of Leith at Slateford. To the north of the aqueduct, on the side of the accessible towpath, is the parallel Slateford Viaduct, which carries an operational railway.

== See also ==
- List of canal aqueducts in Great Britain
