= Puddling (civil engineering) =

Material and process of lining a water body with a watertight clay layer

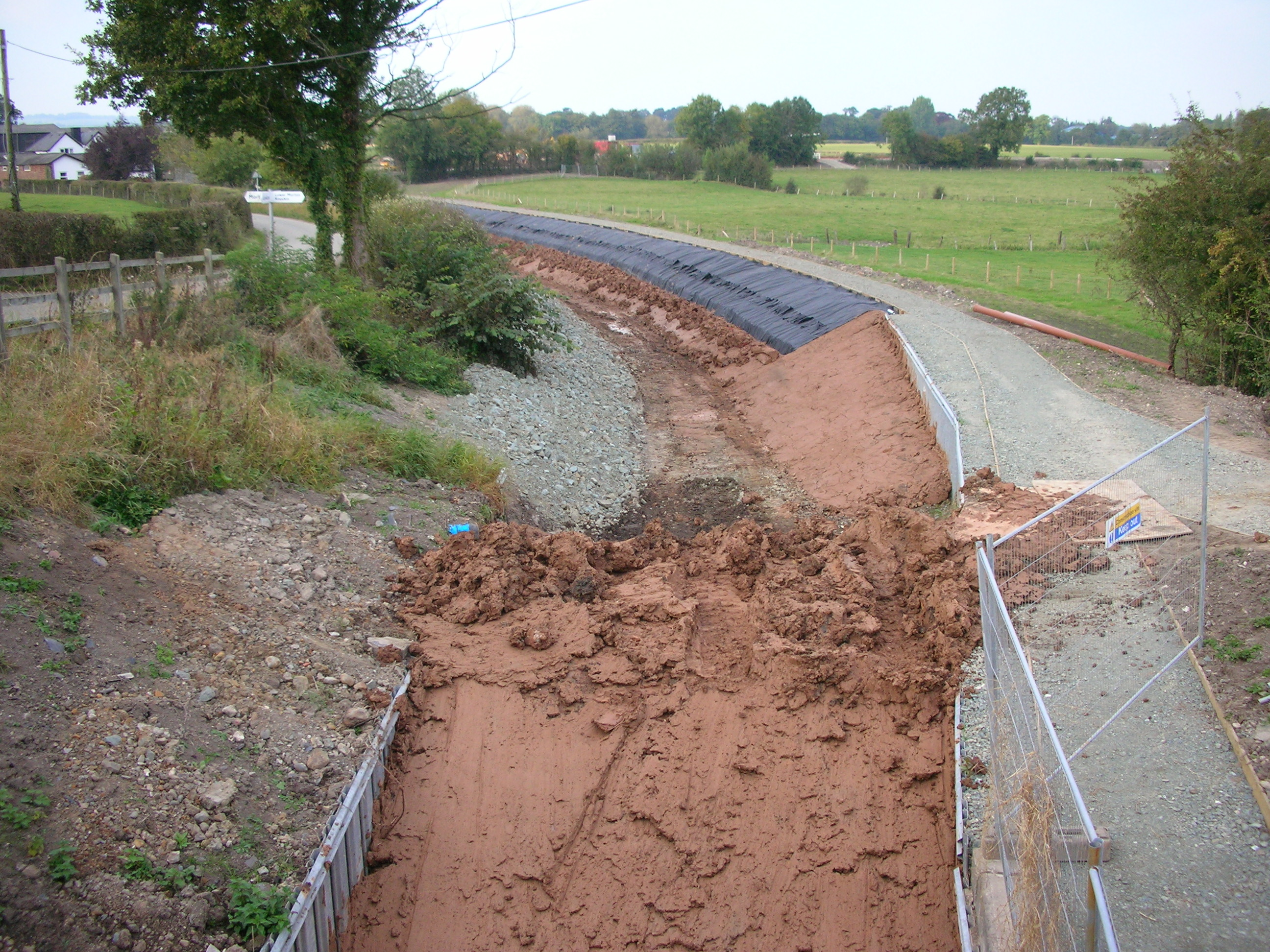
New puddle lining to the sides of a restored section of the Montgomery Canal at Redwith Bridge. A huge plug of puddle clay temporarily blocks the end of the canal

Puddling is a civil engineering technique historically used to create watertight barriers in canals, reservoirs, and earthworks by compacting clay to prevent water leakage. The process involves kneading, mixing, and compacting clay—often with water—to form an impermeable layer known as puddle clay. This method was essential in the construction of canals, dams, and embankments before the development of modern waterproofing materials.

Puddling was widely used during the 18th and 19th centuries, notably in the construction of Britain’s canal network, where engineers such as James Brindley and Thomas Telford employed it to line waterways and prevent seepage. Although largely replaced by modern materials like concrete and synthetic liners, puddling remains relevant in the restoration of historic structures and some environmentally sensitive projects where natural materials are preferred.

== Puddle clay as a lining ==
Puddling is used in maintaining canals or reservoirs on permeable ground. Prior to the canal age, it had been used to line pits for tanning, and by Dutch drainage engineers in the Fens. The technique of puddling canals was developed by early canal engineer James Brindley; it is considered his greatest contribution to engineering. This processed material was used extensively in UK canal construction in the period starting circa 1780. Starting about 1840 puddle clay was used more widely as the water-retaining element (or core) within earthfill dams, particularly in the Pennines. Its usage in UK dams was superseded about 1960 by the use of rolled clay in the core, and better control of moisture content.

A considerable number of early notable dams were built in that era and they are now sometimes referred to as the 'Pennines embankment' type. These dams are characterized by a slender vertical puddle clay core supported on both sides by earthfill shoulders of more heterogeneous material. To control under-seepage through the natural foundation below the dam, the Pennines embankments generally constructed a puddle clay-filled cutoff trench in rock directly below the central core. Later construction often used concrete to fill the cutoff trench.

To make puddle, clay or heavy loam is chopped with a spade and mixed into a plastic state with water and sometimes coarse sand or grit to discourage excavation by moles or water voles. The puddle is laid about 10 inches (25 cm) thick at the sides and nearly 3 ft (0.9 m) thick at the bottom of a canal, built up in layers. Puddle has to be kept wet in order to remain waterproof so it is important for canals to be kept filled with water.

The clay is laid down with a tool called a 'punner', or 'pun', a large rectangular block on a handle about 5 feet (1.5 m) long, or trodden down, or compacted by some other means (e.g. by an excavator using the convex outside of its scoop, or, historically, by driving cattle across the area).

== Puddle as a building material ==
Puddle clay or puddle adobe is often called cob. Cob has added ingredients of a fibrous material to act as a mechanical binder.

== See also ==
- Canals of the United Kingdom
- History of the British canal system

== Bibliography ==
- Moffat, A I B; Tedd, Paul (7 July 2015). Reservoirs in a Changing World. Thomas Telford/ICE Virtual Library. doi:10.1680/riacw.31395.0046.
- Paget-Tomlinson, Edward (1996). Waterways in the Making. The Landscape Press. ISBN 978-0-947849-03-0.
- Paget-Tomlinson, Edward (2006). The Illustrated History of Canal and River Navigations. Landmark Publishing. ISBN 978-1-84306-207-3.
- Reeves, George M.; Sims, Ian; Cripps, J. C., eds. (2006). Clay Materials Used in Construction. Geological Society. p. 377. ISBN 978-1-86239-184-0.
