= Canals in Cheshire =

A large number of canals were built in Cheshire, England, during the early phases of the Industrial Revolution to transport goods and raw materials. This resulted in a significant canal network which is now enjoyed by holiday-makers, anglers, walkers, and others.

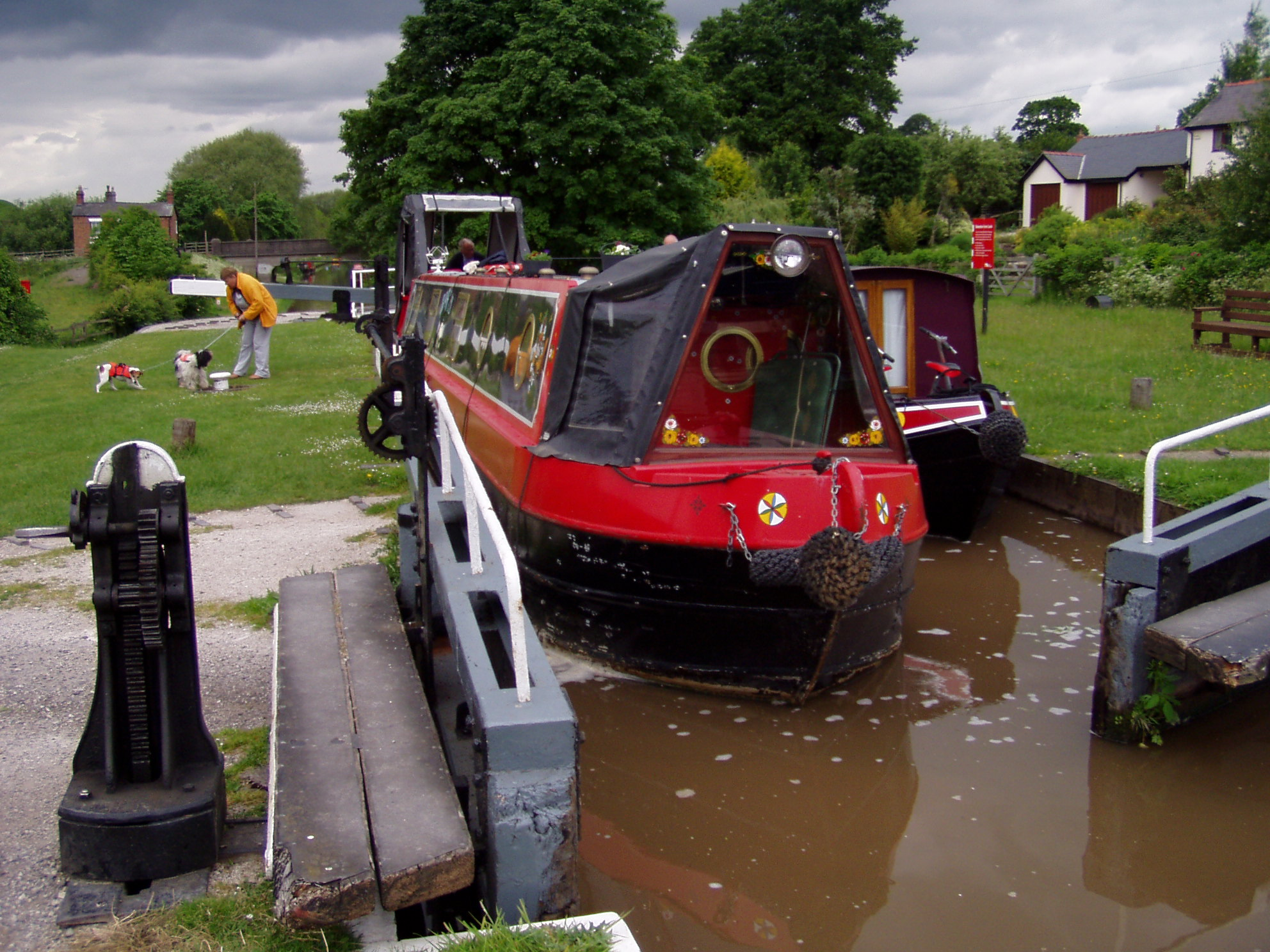
Canal boats navigating the Beeston Locks

== Routes of navigable canals ==
=== Bridgewater Canal ===
The Bridgewater Canal runs from Preston Brook, near Runcorn, to Leigh in Greater Manchester. The original section of the canal starts at Castlefield Basin in Manchester city centre where it joins the Rochdale Canal. The canal runs west from Manchester for about 4 miles (6 km), where it splits into two parts at "Waters Meeting" junction. It then passes Hulme Lock, an unused connection to the River Irwell and the Manchester Ship Canal, and a new lock at Pomona which accesses the Ship Canal.

From Waters Meeting, the original part of the canal passes over the Manchester Ship Canal on the Barton Swing Aqueduct at Salford and travels about 15 miles (24 km) to Leigh, where it makes an end-on connection with the Leeds and Liverpool Canal.

The other part of the canal travels about 20 miles (32 km) south-west to Runcorn, passing through the towns of Sale and Lymm, and to the south of central Warrington. At Preston Brook, the canal connects with the Trent and Mersey Canal.

=== Trent and Mersey Canal ===
The Trent and Mersey Canal links the River Trent at Derwent Mouth (in Derbyshire) to the River Mersey. The second connection is made via the Bridgewater Canal, which it joins at Preston Brook in Cheshire. Although mileposts measure the distance to Preston Brook and Shardlow, Derwent Mouth is a mile or so beyond Shardlow.

=== Peak Forest Canal ===
The Peak Forest Canal runs from a junction with the Ashton Canal at the southern end of the Tame Aqueduct at Dukinfield through Newton, Hyde, Woodley, Bredbury, Romiley, Marple, Strines, Disley, New Mills, Furness Vale, and Bridgemont. It terminates at Bugsworth Basin, and there is a short branch at Bridgemont to Whaley Bridge. This canal is just over 14.5 miles (23.3 km) long.

At Marple, the canal crosses Marple Aqueduct and then rises through 16 locks and makes a junction at Top Lock with the Macclesfield Canal.

=== Wardle Canal ===
The Wardle Canal is located in Middlewich, Cheshire, and connects the Trent and Mersey Canal to the Shropshire Union Canal (Middlewich branch). It is the shortest canal in the UK, at approximately 100 feet (30.5 m) long, and terminates with a single lock (known as Wardle lock).

=== Macclesfield Canal ===
The Macclesfield Canal runs 26 miles (42 km) from Marple Junction where it joins the Peak Forest Canal, southwards (through Bollington, Macclesfield, and Congleton), to a junction with the Trent and Mersey Canal near Kidsgrove.

=== Shropshire Union Canal ===
The Shropshire Union Canal links Wolverhampton (and the Birmingham Canal Navigations) with the River Mersey.

== History ==
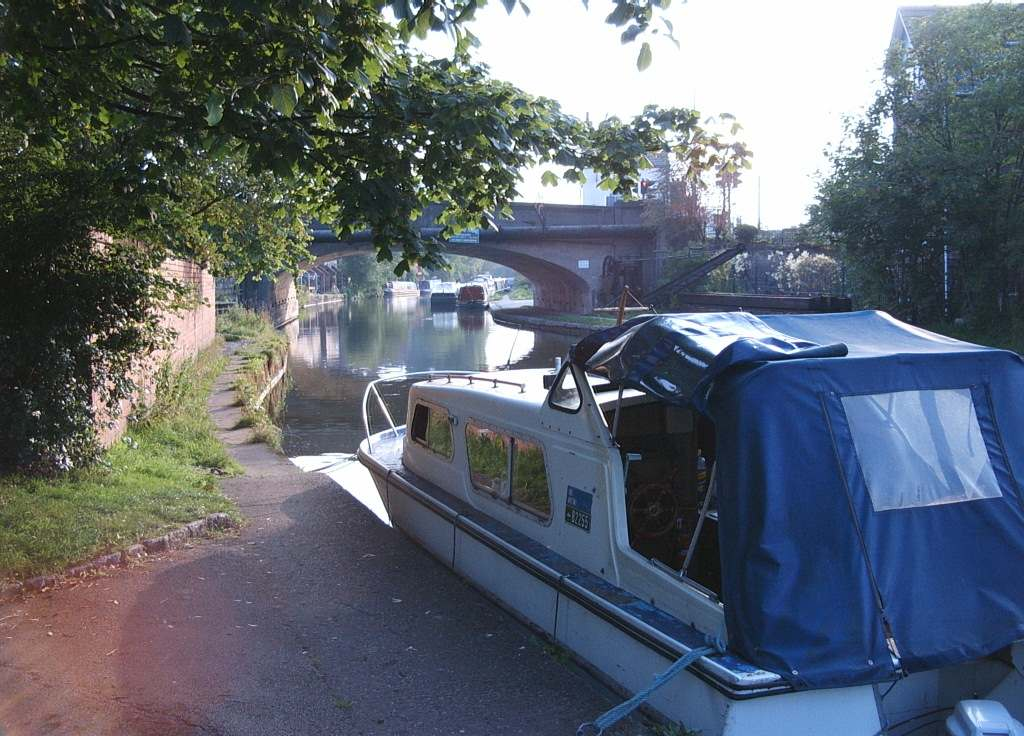
Bridgewater Canal at Stockton Heath

The Bridgewater Canal is often considered to be the first true canal in Britain. However, the Sankey Canal also has good claim to that title. Although the Sankey Canal was originally contained within the old county of Lancashire, the transfer of Warrington and Widnes to Cheshire means that it now lies partly in the county. Preston Brook also lies in Cheshire, south of the River Mersey.

=== Opening dates ===
Where possible, opening dates for the entire length have been used. Otherwise the date indicates when the Act of Parliament was granted.

- 1721 – River Weaver (canalised)
- 1757 – Sankey Brook Navigation – Engineer Henry Berry and William Taylor,
- 1761 – Bridgewater Canal – Engineer James Brindley
- 1772 – Chester Canal
- 1777 – Trent and Mersey Canal – Engineer James Brindley
- 1796 – Ashton Canal
- 1800 – Peak Forest Canal – Engineer Benjamin Outram and Thomas Brown
- 1804 – Rochdale Canal
- 1829 – Wardle Canal
- 1831 – Macclesfield Canal
- 1835 – Shropshire Union Canal – Engineer Thomas Telford and others
- 1894 – Manchester Ship Canal – Engineers Edward Leader Williams

== List of canals in Cheshire ==
The following is an incomplete list of canals (or navigable rivers) which pass (at least in part) through Cheshire:

- Trent and Mersey Canal
- Shropshire Union Canal
- Macclesfield Canal
- Ellesmere Canal
- Llangollen Canal
- Chester Canal
- Manchester Ship Canal
- River Weaver
- Rochdale Canal
- Ashton Canal
- Peak Forest Canal
- Bridgewater Canal
- Cheshire Ring
- Wardle Canal

== Structures found on canals ==
- Anderton Boat Lift
- Red Bull Aqueduct
- Marple Lock Flight

== The Cheshire Ring ==
Schematic of the Cheshire Ring

The Cheshire Ring is a popular canal cruise which includes six of the canals in Cheshire. Because it takes approximately a week to complete, it is suited to narrowboat holidays which start and return to the same location. The route has 92 locks and is 97 miles (156 km) long. It is popular because it offers a contrast between the city centre of Manchester, views of the Peak District, and the Cheshire Plain.

== See also ==
- Geography of England
- Transport in England
- Transport in the United Kingdom
- History of the British canal system
