= Strines railway station =

Railway station in Greater Manchester, England

Strines
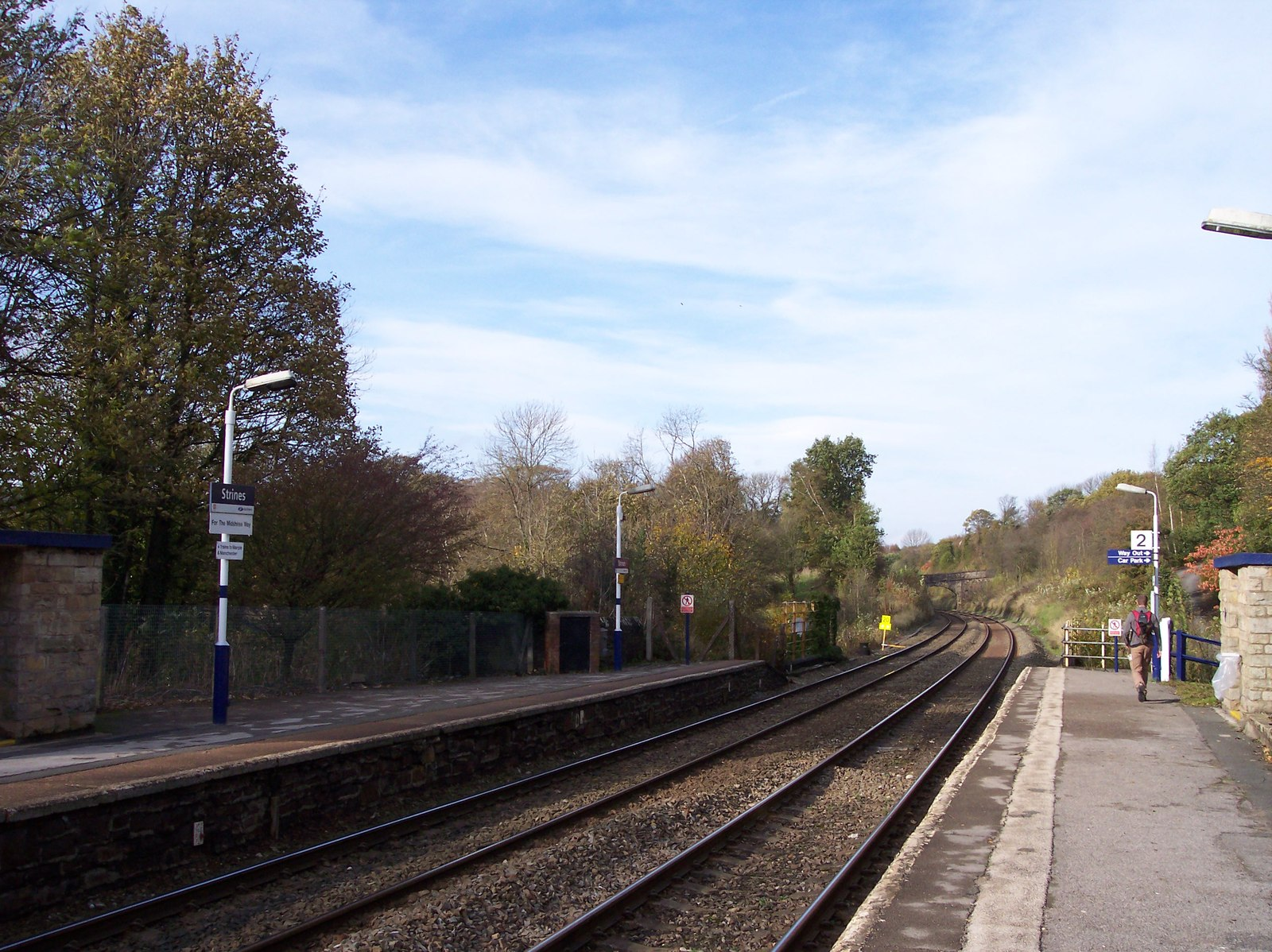
- Strines station in 2011

General information
- Location: Strines, Metropolitan Borough of Stockport; England
- Coordinates: 53.375°N 2.033°W
- Grid reference: SJ978864
- Manager: Northern Trains
- Transit authority: Greater Manchester
- Platforms: 2

Other information
- Station code: SRN
- Classification: DfT category F2

History
- Original company: Marple, New Mills and Hayfield Junction Railway
- Pre-grouping: Great Central and Midland Joint Railway
- Post-grouping: Great Central and Midland Joint Railway

Key dates
- August 1866: Station opened

Passengers
- 2021/22: ▲14,972
- 2022/23: ▼14,822
- 2023/24: ▲16,864
- 2024/25: ▼13,686
- 2025/26: ▲24,412
Location
Notes
- Passenger statistics from the Office of Rail and Road

Strines railway station serves the village of Strines and the hamlet of Turf Lea in the Metropolitan Borough of Stockport, in Greater Manchester, England. Until boundary changes in 1994, the station itself lay over the border in Derbyshire.

== History ==
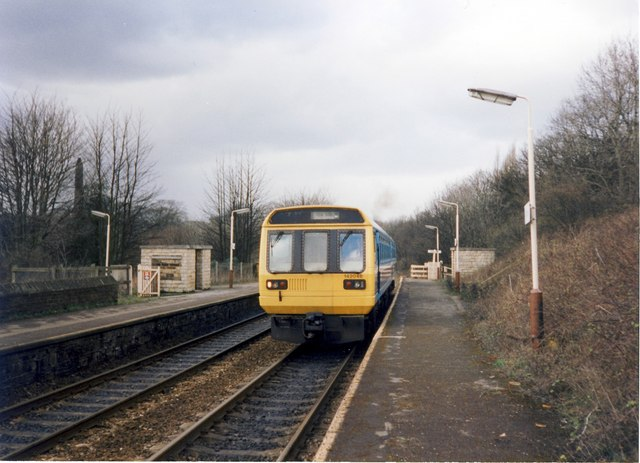
Strines railway station in 1989

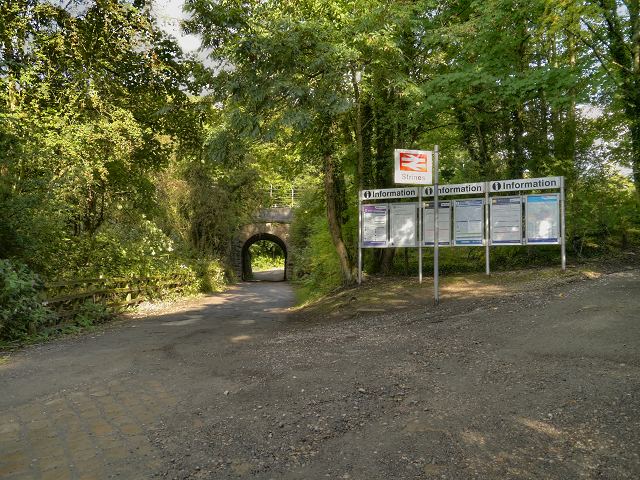
The approach to the station

The Marple, New Mills and Hayfield Junction Railway (MNM&HJ) was formed in 1860; its line between New Mills and Marple was opened on 1 July 1865. Originally, there were no intermediate stations but one was opened at Strines in August 1866. The MNM&HJ was leased to and worked by the Manchester, Sheffield and Lincolnshire Railway (MS&L) from opening, but was absorbed jointly by the MS&L and the Midland Railway following an Act of 24 June 1869. It then became part of the Sheffield and Midland Railway Companies' Committee, an undertaking formed on 6 August 1872. The latter was renamed the Great Central and Midland Joint Railway in the early twentieth century.

Originally, there were no goods or coal facilities but the MS&L agreed to these late in 1870. The station had a substantial stone-built booking office and waiting room, with a stationmaster's house. These were considered sufficiently impressive to be used as location shoots for films in the early 1970s. They disappeared when the station became an unstaffed halt in 1973.

== Services ==
The station hosts an hourly daytime service in each direction between New Mills Central and Manchester Piccadilly on Mondays to Saturdays, with additional calls during weekday peak periods. On Sundays, hourly services operate between Sheffield and Manchester Piccadilly.

Preceding station	National Rail	Following station
Marple	Northern Trains Hope Valley Line	New Mills Central

== In literature ==
It is believed that the inspiration for Edith Nesbit's 1906 novel The Railway Children came from Strines.
