= Strines =

Village in Greater Manchester, England

Coordinates: 53.373°N 2.039°W

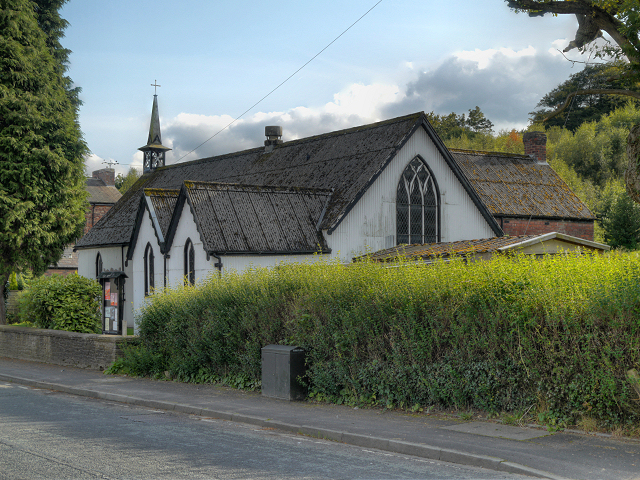
- St Paul's Church

- Location within Greater Manchester
- OS grid reference: SJ973863
- Metropolitan borough: Stockport
- Metropolitan county: Greater Manchester
- Region: North West
- Country: England
- Sovereign state: United Kingdom
- Post town: STOCKPORT
- Postcode district: SK6
- Dialling code: 0161
- Police: Greater Manchester
- Fire: Greater Manchester
- Ambulance: North West
- UK Parliament: Hazel Grove

Strines is a village in Greater Manchester, England; it lies in the valley of the river Goyt. It is midway between Marple and New Mills, about 6 miles (10 km) south-east of Stockport. The village lies within the Marple parish and the Metropolitan Borough of Stockport. Immediately surrounding Strines are the villages of Woodend, Hague Bar and Brookbottom, where there is a conservation area; close by are the villages of Mellor and Rowarth, and the hamlet of Turf Lea.

== History ==
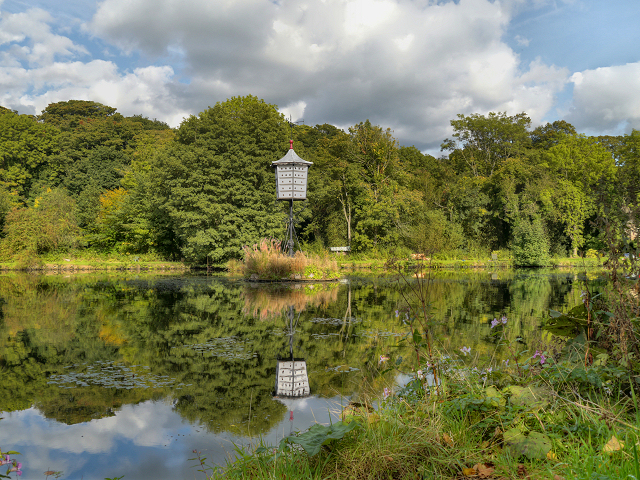
The Chinese dovecote

In medieval times, the area was part of a large hunting forest, the Forest of the Peak; it covered much of the Peak District and surrounding area. Eventually the more useful areas were taken over (assarted) by local families, which are the origins of the Strines Hall Estate.

Strines had a print works from 1792 to 2001; from 1899, it was one of the Calico Printers' Association mills. The works' reservoir remains, with a Grade II listed Chinese dovecote in its centre, dating from at least 1853.

== Geography ==
The River Goyt, which winds through the Strines valley, is bounded by flat pastures giving way to a patchwork of fields and old dense woodland on the hills on either side. The area is criss-crossed with footpaths, ancient roads and packhorse routes.

The Peak Forest Canal passes north–south to the west of the village.

== Transport ==
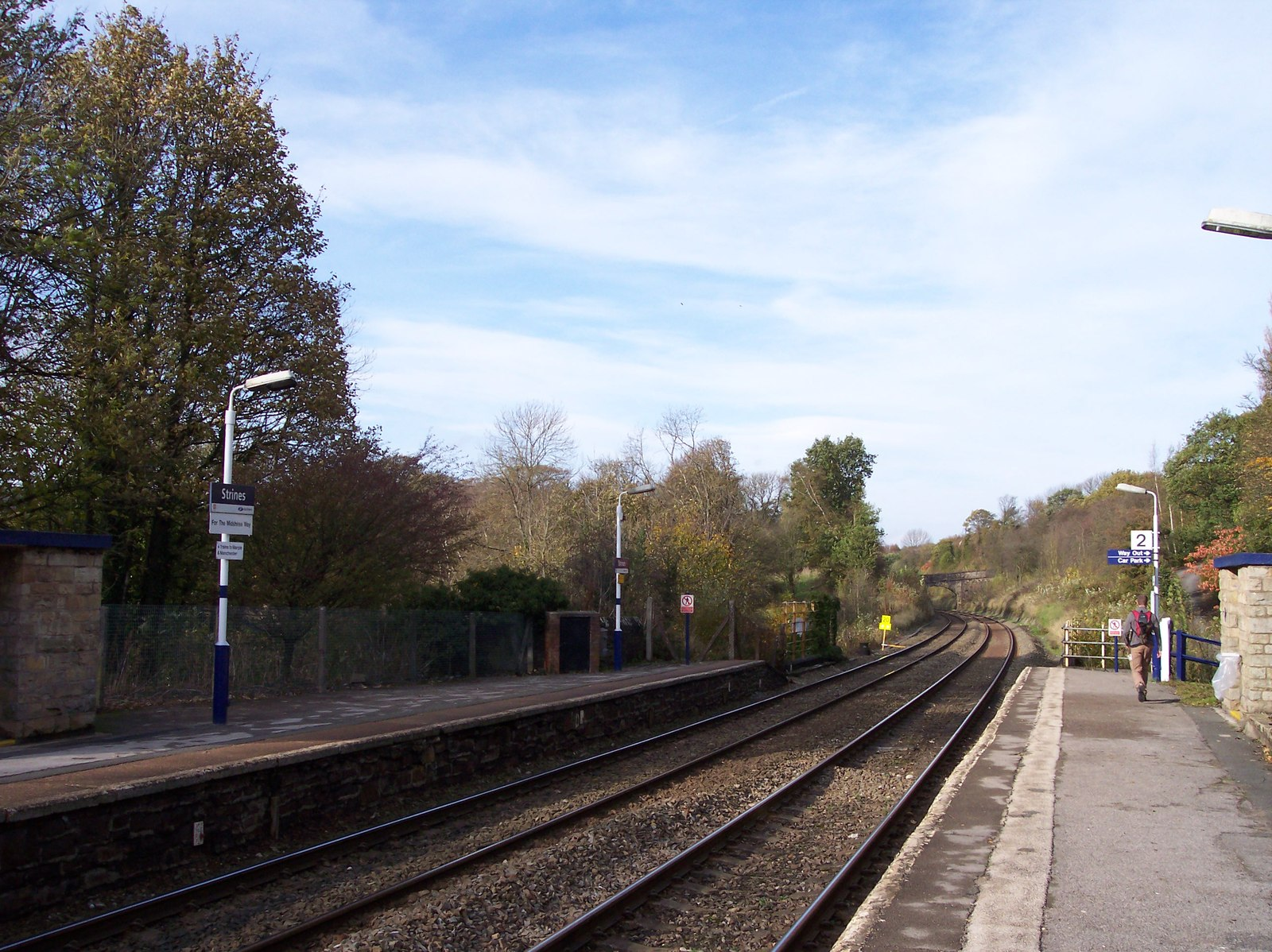
Strines railway station, 2011

The village is served by Strines railway station on the Hope Valley Line. The station, and all stopping services, are operated by Northern Trains. There is generally an hourly service each way between New Mills Central and Manchester Piccadilly, with some additional calls during weekday peak periods. On Sundays, there are approximately hourly services between Sheffield and Manchester Piccadilly.

The 358 bus route, which runs between Stockport and Hayfield, passes through Strines; buses are operated by Stagecoach Manchester.

The B1101 (Strines Road) bisects the village north-west to south-east, connecting it with Marple and New Mills.

== Amenities ==
- Strines Pavilion
- Strines Recreation Ground
- The Strines Nightingale public house.

== In popular culture ==
There is evidence that the inspiration for Edith Nesbit's novel The Railway Children came from Strines.

== See also ==
- Listed buildings in Marple, Greater Manchester.
