= Marple Aqueduct =

Aqueduct in Greater Manchester, England

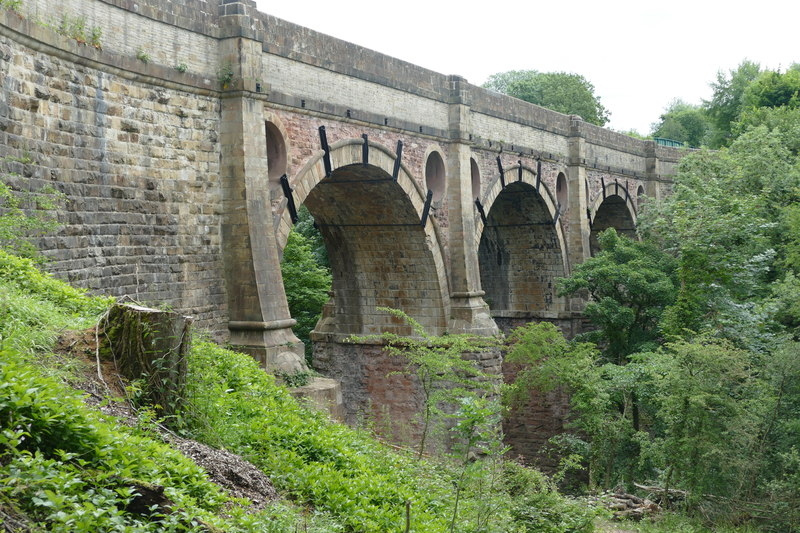
- Marple Aqueduct in 2015
- Coordinates: 53.4073°N 2.0691°W
- OS grid reference: SJ955900
- Carries: Peak Forest Canal
- Crosses: River Goyt
- Locale: Marple, Greater Manchester
- Maintained by: Canal & River Trust
- Heritage status: Grade I listed, Scheduled Monument

Characteristics
- Total length: 105 yards (96 m)
- Width: 8 feet (2.4 m)
- Height: 30 metres (98 ft)
- Traversable?: yes
- Towpaths: Western side only
- No. of spans: Three

History
- Designer: Benjamin Outram
- Construction start: 1795
- Construction end: 1799
- Opened: 1800

Location
- Interactive map of Marple Aqueduct

Marple Aqueduct (also known as Goyt Aqueduct) at Marple, Greater Manchester, England, was built to carry the lower level of the Peak Forest Canal across the River Goyt (treated as part of the River Mersey until 1896). It is the highest aqueduct in England. Construction started in 1795, and it was in use by 1800. A contractor employed to build the main canal suggested that the stone arches be replaced by iron troughs, and this idea was almost adopted, but when he left, the original idea of stone arches was adopted.

Some repairs were made to the aqueduct in 1860 and 1912, following damage caused by water leaking through the clay puddling used to seal the channel and then freezing. In early 1962, part of the side wall collapsed, again caused by leaks freezing. British Waterways wanted to demolish the structure as a cheaper solution than repairing it, but Cheshire County Council contributed towards the cost of repairs in a move that paved the way for the restoration of the Peak Forest Canal. As part of the process, it became a scheduled monument, and subsequently a grade I listed structure.

During the 21st century, grants enabled several projects to be undertaken to enhance the aqueduct and its surroundings. It had become obscured by tree growth in the valley of the River Goyt, and some of the trees were cut back so the structure could be seen again. Vegetation growing out of the structure was removed, and the stonework repointed. A metal parapet was designed and fitted to the north side of the aqueduct, where previously a low wall had offered very little protection against falling from the structure.

== History ==
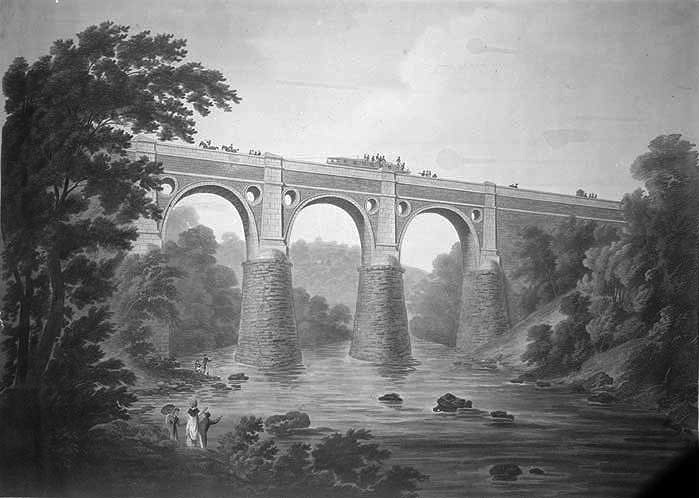
An aquatint of the aqueduct engraved by Francis Jukes from a drawing by Joseph Parry, 1803

Marple aqueduct forms part of the Peak Forest Canal. Work began on the canal in 1794, and it opened in 1800, although that included a tramway to connect the two halves, as there was insufficient money to complete the Marple Lock Flight, and the locks were finally completed in 1804. The company's engineer, Benjamin Outram, was responsible for the design of the aqueduct, which was located just to the north of the locks, and Thomas Brown, the resident engineer, for its construction. The construction contract was placed with William Broadhead, Bethel Furness and William Anderson on 5 February 1795, but Furness died in December 1795, so the structure was completed by Broadhead and Anderson.

Some five months earlier, in October 1794, a contract for excavating part of the canal had been given to an American called Robert Fulton and his partner Charles McNiven. They failed to get on with the work, which Outram reported to the committee in March 1795. Fulton then began offering engineering advice to the committee, including the use of tub-boats and inclined planes rather than conventional narrow boats and locks. Outram and two others were sent to visit Coalbrookdale on the Shropshire Canal, to see such a system, and returned to report favourably on the idea. Although work had already started on the aqueduct, he suggested that it should be constructed with iron troughs, instead of the stone arches in Outram's design. The committee approved the use of iron, and encouraged Fulton to commit his ideas to print. An article on Small Canals was published in the London Star on 30 July 1795, and a book entitled A Treatise on the Improvement of Canal Navigation followed in 1796, probably financed by the canal company. He was still working for the company in September 1795, but then disappears from their records.

Once Fulton had departed, the ideas of tub boats and inclined planes were dropped, and the aqueduct reverted to using stone arches. The keystones for the three arches were fitted in 1799 and the work was sufficiently complete that it was filled with water in May 1800. However, work continued on it until late 1801. Repair work to the wing wall of one of the piers was required in 1817, when it was found to be collapsing. Seven men lost their lives during its construction.

The structure is 309 feet (94 m) long and contains some 8,000 cubic yards (6,000 m^{3}) of masonry. The lower parts are of red sandstone from the nearby Hyde Bank quarry, while the upper parts are of white stone from a quarry at Chapel Milton. The channel was made waterproof by a layer of puddle clay with a facing of bricks. Three semi-circular arches support the canal, which is about 100 feet (30 m) above the level of the river. The piers supporting the arches are at 72 feet (22 m) centres. It is the highest canal aqueduct in England and the highest masonry-arch aqueduct in Britain. Its height is only exceeded by the Pontcysyllte aqueduct in Wales, an iron trough carried on stone columns, where the height above the river is 126 feet (38 m).

In 1860, repeated frost heave after water leaked through the puddling of the trough resulted in an 11-inch (28 cm) deflection of the parapet. Part of the side wall was rebuilt, and 2-inch (51 mm) bolts with tie bars were used to hold the two faces of the central arch together. Metal tie bars were added to the other arches in 1912, but otherwise maintenance was sparse. By the time the waterways were nationalised in 1948, the canal was semi-derelict, and mainly acted as a water supply for canal-side industries in Manchester. A British Transport Commission report published in 1955 recommended closure or disposal of 771 miles (1,241 km) of waterways, including the Peak Forest Canal. The lack of maintenance led to water seeping into the puddling and stonework of the aqueduct, and during the very cold winter of 1961/62, freezing and thawing of the water resulted in the outer face of the north-east arch collapsing into the river below, on 9 January 1962. Some 30 feet (9.1 m) of the wall was affected at the time, but further damage occurred during the winter of 1962/63, which was colder still. The Marple Residents Association were one of several groups that campaigned for the aqueduct to be repaired. Bredbury and Romiley Urban District Council held a conference on its future, and started the process of getting the structure scheduled as an Ancient Monument.

The secretary of the British Waterways Division of the British Transport Commission wrote to the Ministry of Transport in August 1962. He explained that demolition of the aqueduct would cost £25,000, whereas repairs would cost £32,000. (Note: Figures for demolition and repair costs vary significantly between sources) He suggested that it would be "a complete waste of money" to make the repairs, and the Lower Peak Forest Canal could be closed during the next session of Parliament. The Ashton Canal and part of the Macclesfield Canal could also be closed at the same time. J.E. Sandersen, on behalf of the Ministry of Transport, recommended demolition and closure of the Lower Peak Forest Canal. A senior civil servant called G R Gingell stated that Sandersen was not able to make such a decision, and suggested that Cheshire County Council might like to contribute the difference of £7,000 to enable the structure to be repaired, and might take over the aqueduct in the future if the canal was closed. The Council declined the offer to take over the structure, but agreed to pay the £7,000. By the time tenders were received, the cost had risen by another £16,000, and Cheshire Council agreed to double their contribution to £14,000. The decision was so innovative that it paved the way for the eventual restoration of the Peak Forest and Ashton Canals. The internal machinations of British Waterways and the Ministry of Transport were not made public until 1995 and so were unknown at the time.

Publicly, Geoffrey Rippon, the Minister of Public Buildings and Works, facilitated the agreement with Cheshire County Council, who provided the funding under the terms of the Local Authorities (Historic Buildings) Act 1962 (10 & 11 Eliz. 2. c. 36), which Rippon himself had steered through Parliament. The main contractor for the restoration was Harry Fairclough Ltd of Warrington, with Rendel, Palmer & Tritton as the consulting engineers. Rebuilding of the aqueduct began in September 1963 and was finished in May 1964. As part of the work, the puddle clay waterproofing was replaced with concrete.

The aqueduct was scheduled as an ancient monument soon afterwards and was Grade I listed in 1966. In 2000, it was nominated as one of the 12 features or people who had made a significant impact on the borough of Stockport by residents of the town. A blue Millennium plaque was due to be erected on the structure as a result, but installation was delayed. After campaigning by the Marple Locks Heritage Society the plaque was attached in 2010. Trees growing in the valley below had obscured the picturesque setting of the aqueduct in the Goyt valley by 2000. In 2013, the Canal and River Trust who manage the waterway and the Mellor Archaeological Trust jointly applied for lottery funding. The project was called "Revealing Oldknow's Legacy", and a grant was made in September 2013, part of which was used to cut back the trees to restore the view. The grant was for £2.3 million, and was to bring to public knowledge the work of Samuel Oldknow, an 18th-century industrialist who pioneered the production of muslin. Mellor Mill and Marple Lime Kilns also benefitted from the grant, while vegetation was removed from the aqueduct, some of the stonework was repointed, and the ironwork was repainted.

Like many canal aqueducts, there was a parapet on the towpath side of the structure, but very little protection on the other side. In 2017 the Canal and River Trust decided that this should be remedied for the safety of boaters, and Knight Architects designed a metal parapet which would not detract from the historic nature of the structure. Vertical posts with one vertical leg and another raked leg supported a horizontal rail at the top. The parapet was assembled in sections, which were delivered to site by boat, and fixed to the top of the existing low wall. Inspiration for the design came from weaving, with the vertical posts representing the warp and the horizontal rail representing the weft. Historically, the aqueduct was close to Mellor Cotton Mill. The work was completed in 2018, and was runner-up in the 2019 Living Waterways Awards for heritage and conservation. The railings were funded from part of a £1.7 million donation from the People's Postcode Lottery, which also helped with emergency rebuilding of lock 15 of the Marple flight, and repairs to two other locks in the 16-lock flight.

== See also ==
- Grade I listed buildings in Greater Manchester
- Listed buildings in Marple, Greater Manchester
- List of canal aqueducts in Great Britain
- Scheduled Monuments in Greater Manchester

== Gallery ==
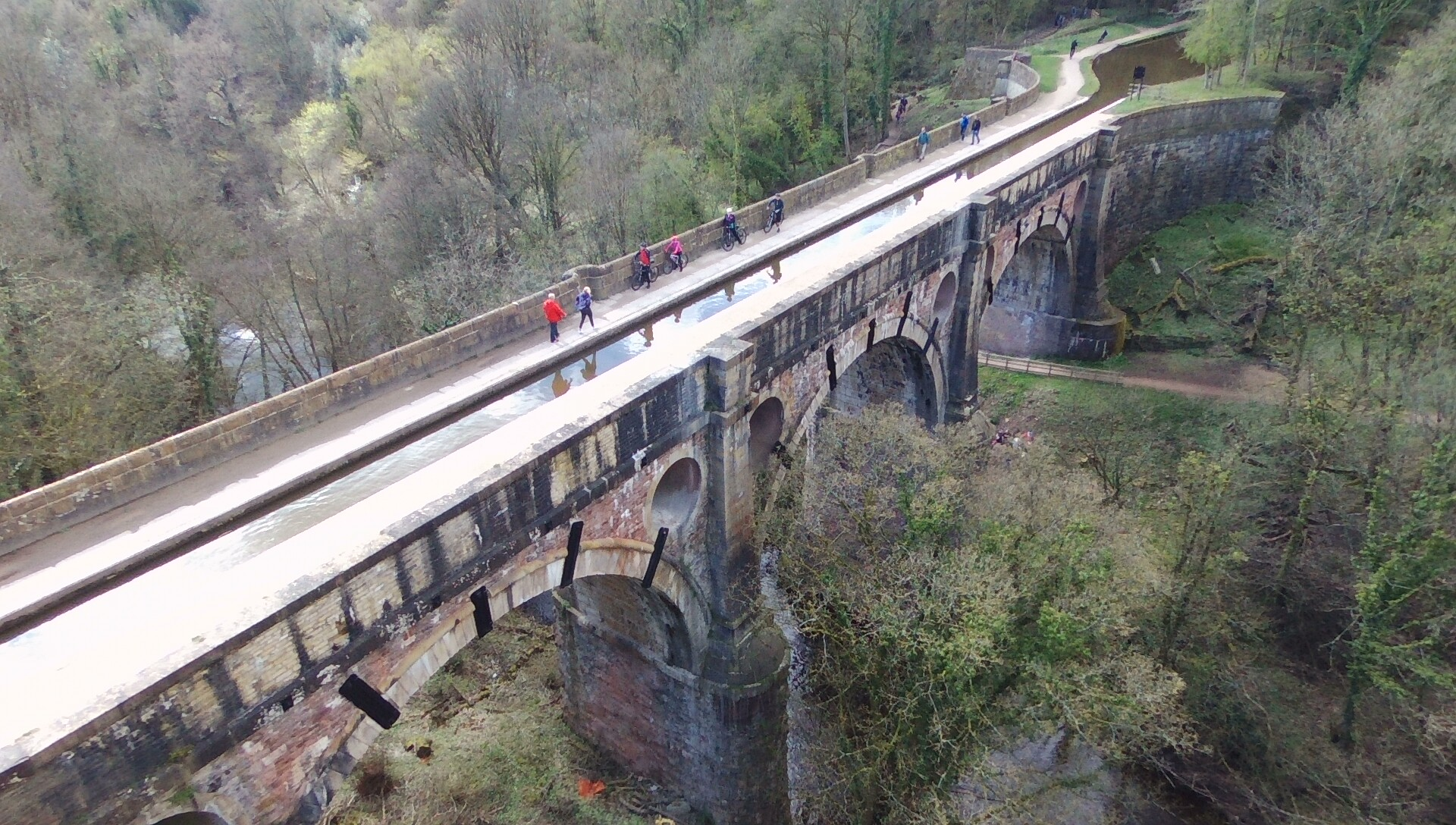
Marple Aqueduct, viewed from a drone

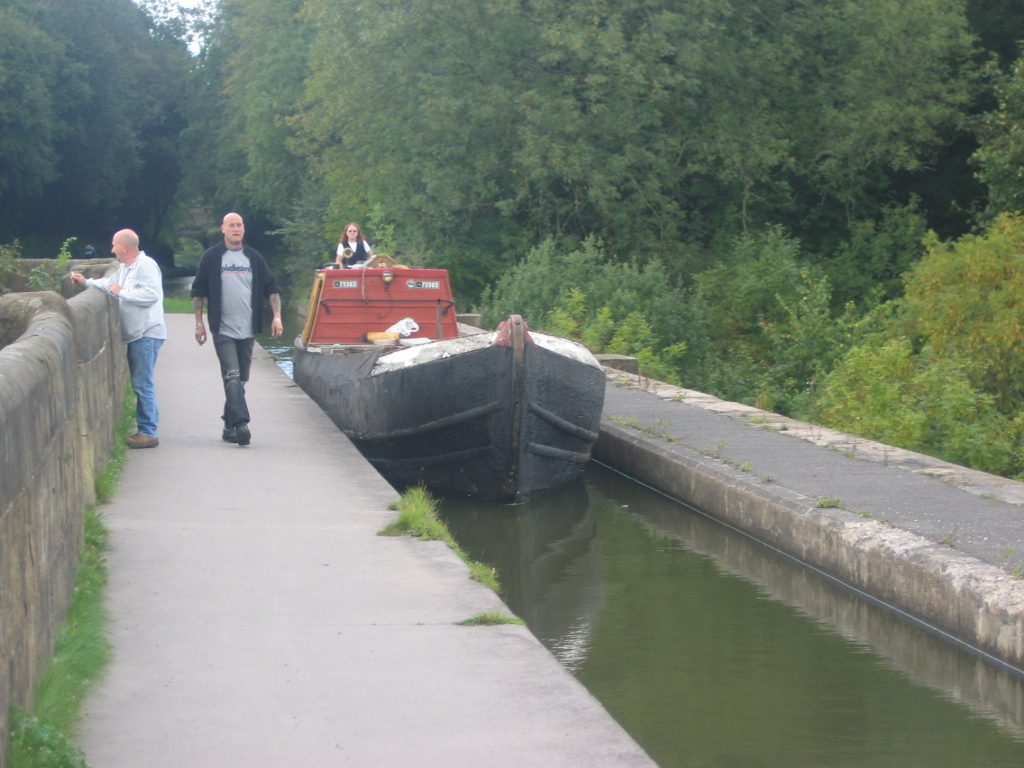
Working boat traversing the aqueduct

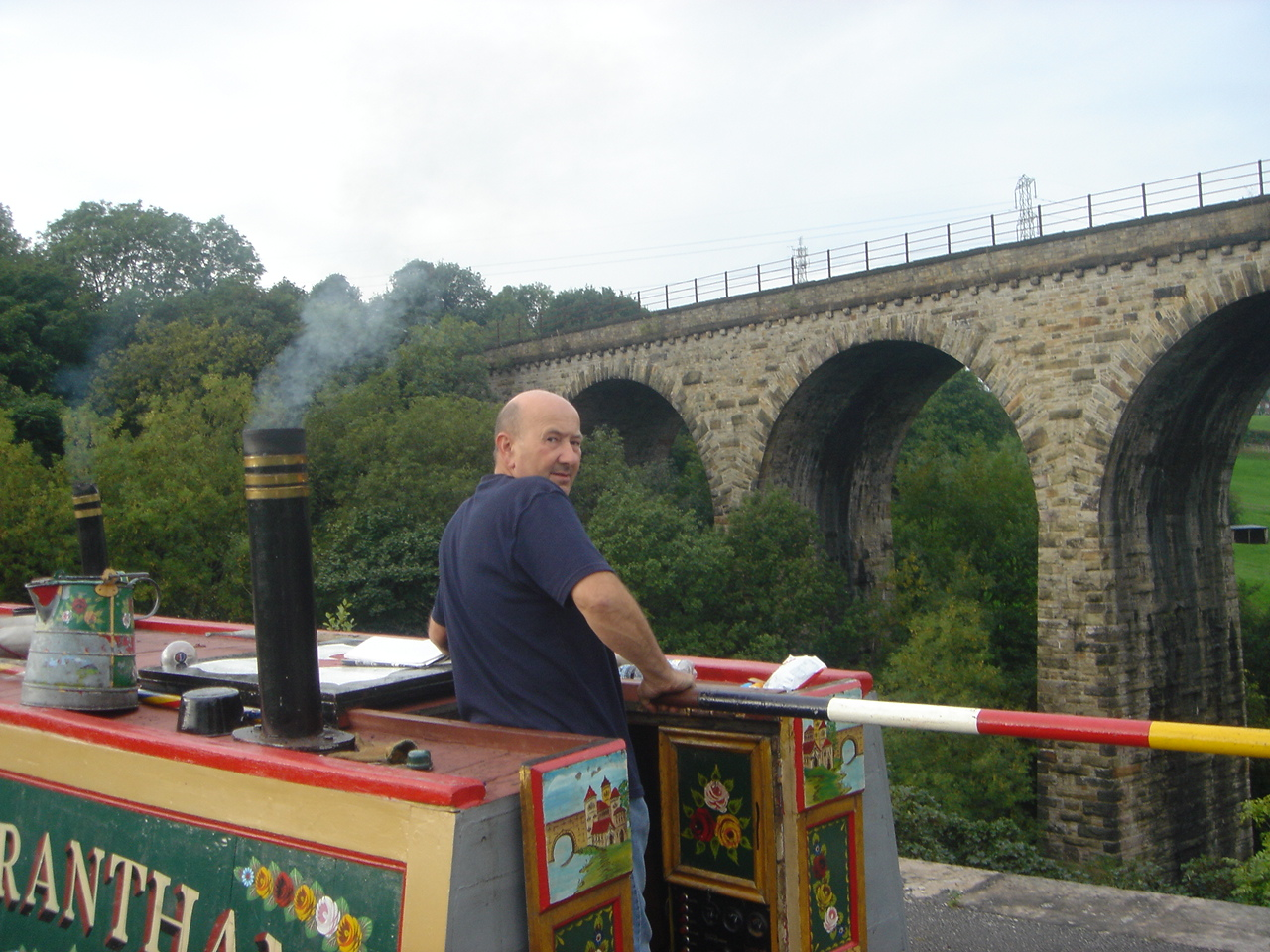
Working narrowboat, with the viaduct to the north

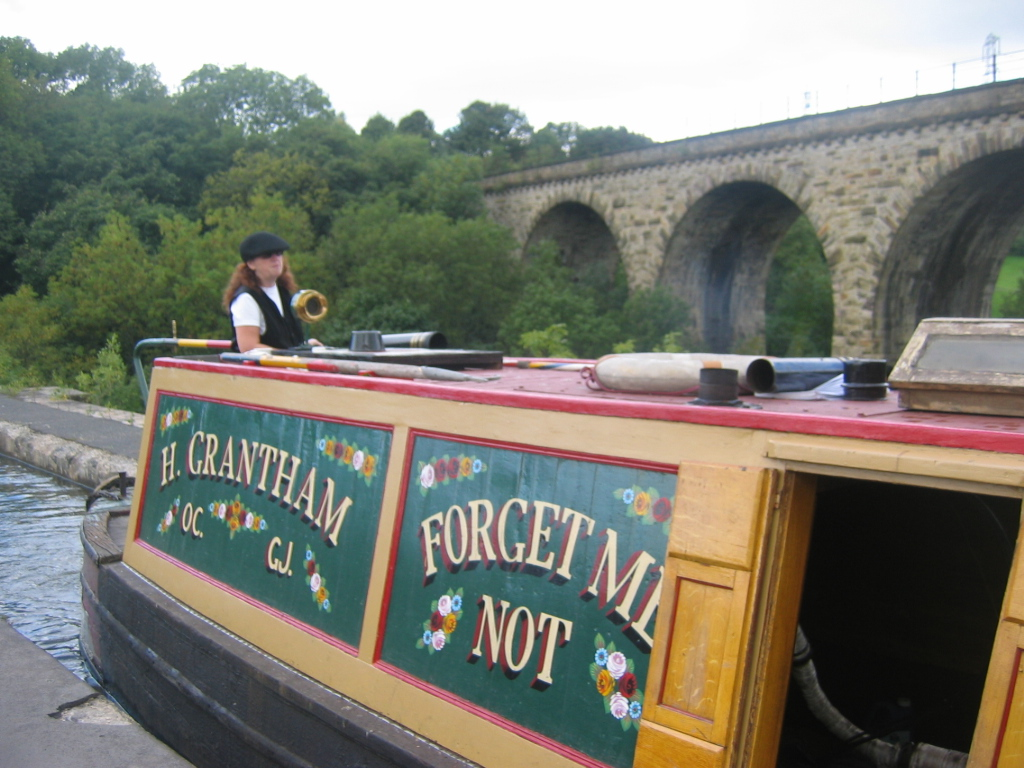
Working freight boat

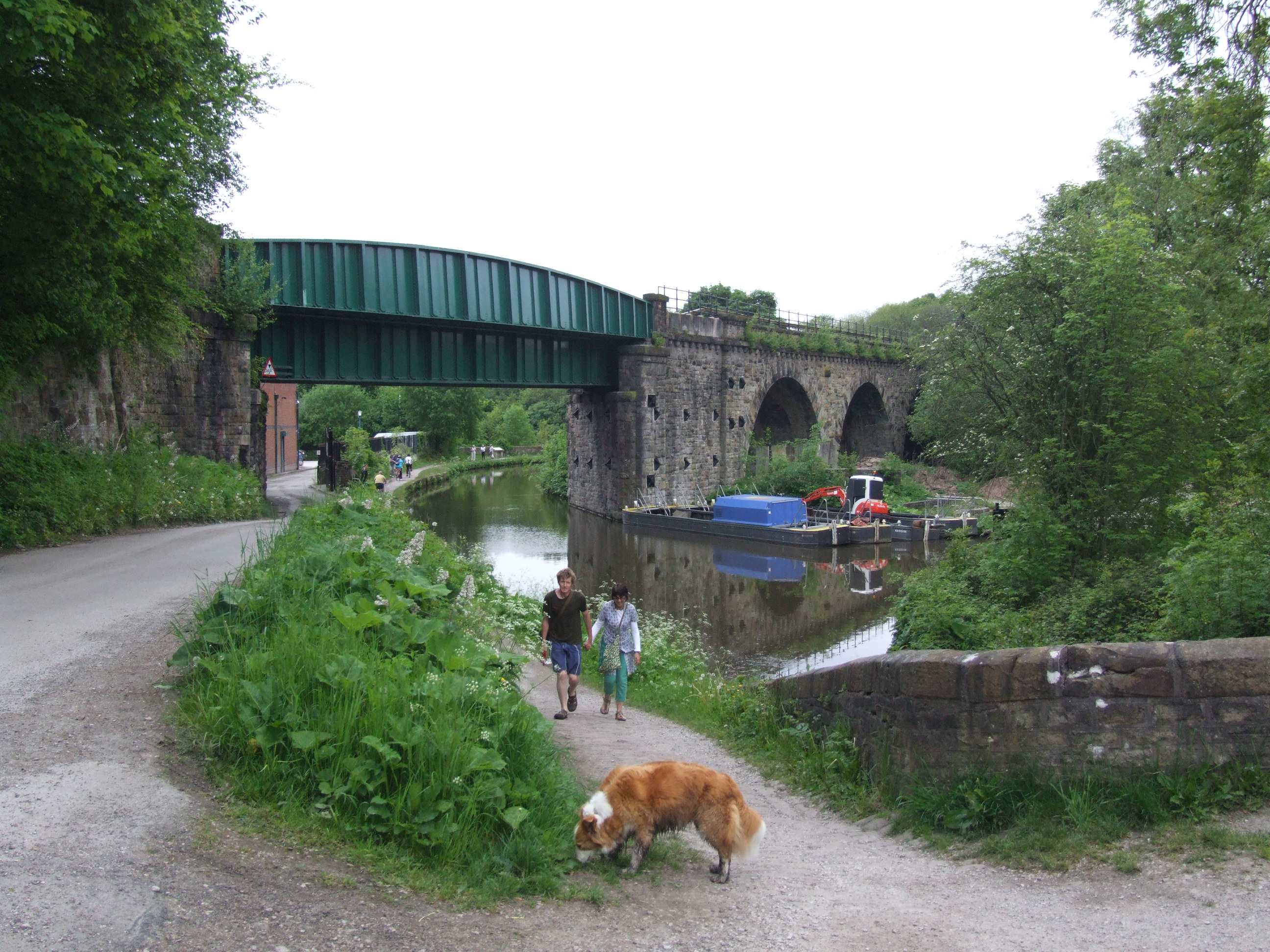
The canal swings away and passes under the railway viaduct

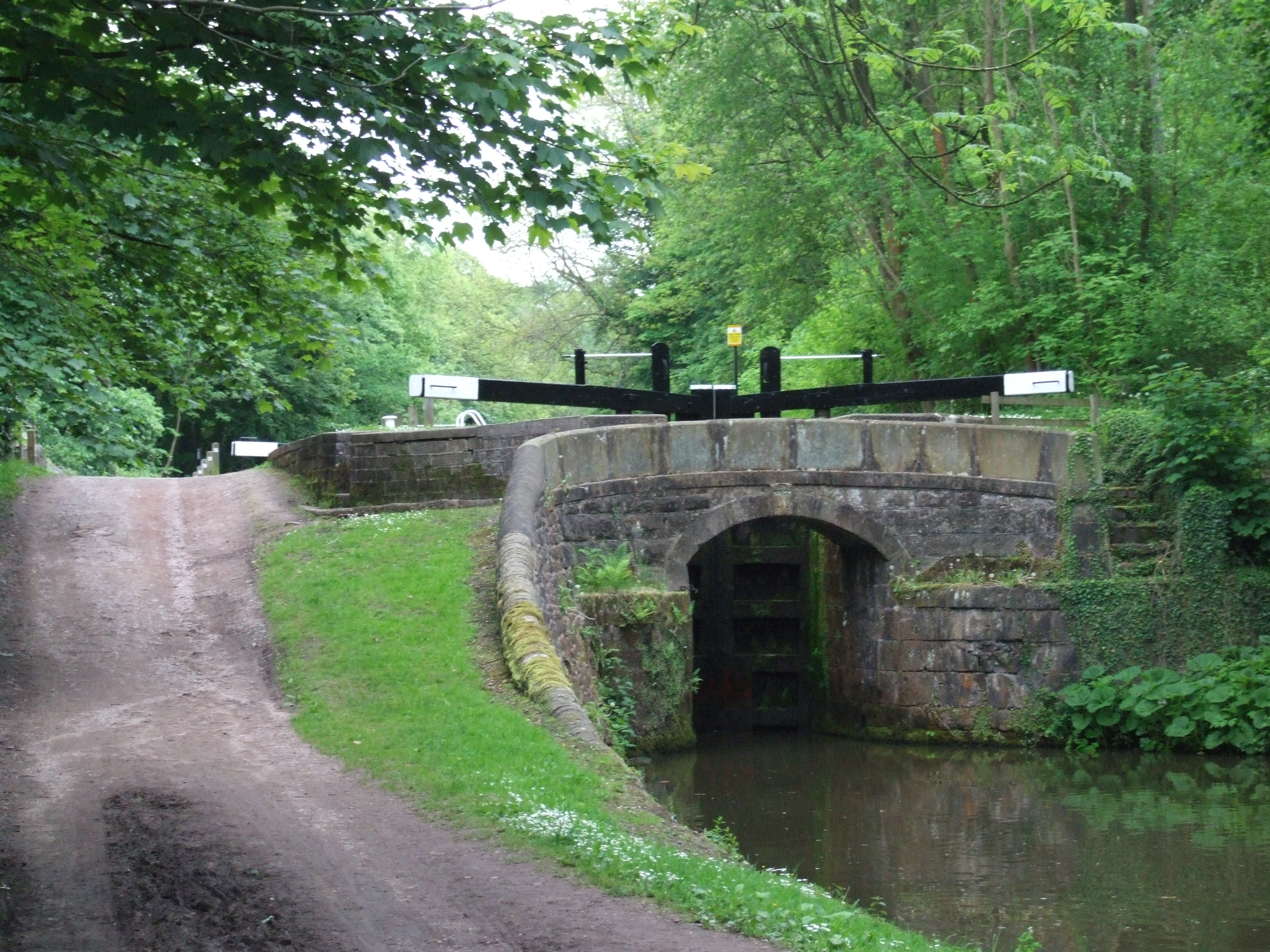
The canal then enters the Marple flight of locks.
