= Thomas Brown (engineer) =

Thomas Brown (1772 – 30 January 1850) was an English surveyor, civil engineer, businessman and landowner.

Thomas Brown was born in 1772 in Mowhole, Disley in Cheshire, where his father owned 11 acres of land. He is believed to have apprenticed to engineer and industrialist Benjamin Outram. Brown had interests in coal-mining, particularly in the Haughton and Hyde areas of Greater Manchester, as well as lime burning and mineral extraction interests. He owned land at Disley, Manchester and Heaton Norris and he lived at Ardwick Green, Manchester.

He is known as the resident engineer for the construction of the Peak Forest Canal and the Peak Forest Tramway and in 1793 he made the initial survey of their routes. Following the resignation of Benjamin Outram in 1801 he was appointed as consulting engineer for the completion of the Marple canal locks. He was also the surveyor for the Ashton Canal and the resident engineer for the construction of the Macclesfield Canal.

Brown married Elizabeth Hancock, the daughter of his partner in his coal and lime business. Together they had 3 children.

By 1841, he was living in Allerton Place at 16 Ardwick Green. He died there on 30 January 1850, aged 78 years. He was buried at St Mary's Church, Disley.
