= Marple Hall School =

Comprehensive school in Greater Manchester, England

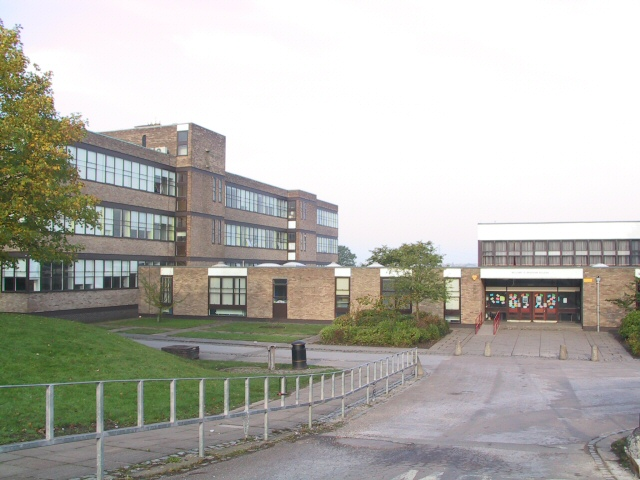

Location
- Hill Top Drive; Marple, Stockport, Greater Manchester, SK6 6LB; England; 53.3980°N 2.0886°W

Information
- Type: Community comprehensive
- Established: 1960
- Local authority: Stockport Metropolitan Borough Council
- Department for Education URN: 106138 Tables
- Ofsted: Reports
- Headteacher: Joe Barker
- Gender: Mixed
- Age: 11 to 16
- Enrolment: 1337
- Houses: Linnet , Fernilee , Errwood and Derwent
- Website: http://www.marplehall.stockport.sch.uk/

Marple Hall School is a secondary school located in Marple, Greater Manchester, England. The school is situated just off Stockport Road (A626), on the eastern outskirts of Greater Manchester, near to the River Goyt.

The school logo

== History ==
=== Grammar school ===
The co-educational comprehensive school was originally Marple Hall County Grammar School, a grammar school, which was built in 1960 by Cheshire Education Committee. It lies alongside the demolished remains of Marple Hall, a manor house once owned by John Bradshaw who signed the death warrant of Charles I of England; Charles Isherwood's family also owned the house. The ruins of the house are still visible just outside the grounds of the school. These two figures give their names to the two main buildings of the modern school. The grammar school's first headmaster was Reginald Hill.

The grammar school later had separate schools for boys and girls:

- Marple Hall County Grammar School for Girls opened in 1965. It had 750 girls in 1967 and 1,000 by 1971. The headteacher of the girls' school up to 1974 was Miss Una Drake.
- Marple Hall Grammar School for Boys had 1,000 boys in 1972.

=== Comprehensive ===
The school was converted into the mixed-sex Marple Hall County High School in September 1974, with a nine form entry. The joint headmaster, Derek J Saville, was appointed in September 1973. It was originally to be called Marple Hall County Comprehensive. From April 1974, the school was administered by Stockport MBC.

The new school taught Russian in the sixth form; it had 1900 boys and girls, with 450 in the sixth form. From 1974 until 1980, the school had comprehensive year groups and grammar (selective intake) year groups. The last selective intake, from entry in 1973, left in 1980; the first year group of comprehensive intake left in 1979 (after GCE O levels) and 1981 (after GCE A levels).

Following Mr Saville's retirement, the sixth form was closed in 1990 after the arrival of the new head, Margaret Cuckson. She remained as headteacher until 2004, when she was replaced by Mrs Lesley Calderbank; under her tenure, the school was in the news for having a year nine Maths class being taught by ten different teachers in two terms.

The previous head, Dr Rose Hegan, took over in September 2010. Dr Hegan resigned in 2013 to be replaced by Mr Joseph Barker, who had been working at the school as a history teacher and was deputy head prior to Dr Hegan's resignation. The school was again in the news in September 2015, after sending home up to 100 students for having incorrect uniforms.

== Notable alumni ==
- Fran Abrams, Radio 4 investigative journalist
- Kyle Bartley, football player
- Karl Davies, actor
- Rachel Haugh, architect
- Peter Holland, Linacre Professor of Zoology at the University of Oxford
- Wyl Menmuir, Man Booker Prize nominated author, 2016
- Sally Rogers, actress

=== Marple Hall Grammar School for Boys ===
- Peter Bowker, screenwriter
- Stephen Bradbury, artist and illustrator

=== Marple Hall Grammar School for Girls ===
- Ann Limb, Baroness Limb, the first woman Chair of The Scout Association
- Thelma Walker, Labour MP since 2017 for Colne Valley
