= William Washington (painter) =

British painter (1885–1956)

- Born: 1 January 1885; Marple, England
- Died: 18 July 1956 (aged 71); Upper Norwood, England
- Occupation: Painter

William Washington RBA ARCA ARE (1 January 1885 – 18 July 1956) was a British engraver and painter and Principal of the Hammersmith School of Art for 20 years.

== Life and career ==
Washington was born in Marple, Cheshire, a son of a railway signalman, and started his studies at Ashton-under-Lyne’s Hegginbottom Art School whilst working for a printing company. He would finish his studies at the Royal College of Art between 1906 and 1910. He obtained his first teaching job at the Southend College of Art, moving onto Clapham School of Art before he was appointed at Hammersmith in 1929.

He exhibited at the Royal Academy of Art, the Royal Society of British Artists, the Paris Salon while the Victoria and Albert Museum and the British Museum hold permanent collections of his work. The Studio magazine described his work as:

whose linear conceptions of places and portraiture are irradiated by a vital expressiveness

His work was part of the painting event in the art competition at the 1948 Summer Olympics. In 1954 he was elected Master of the Art Workers' Guild.

== Legacy ==
In 2014 the Washington Foundation was set up in memory of both William Washington, and his son, ceramicist R J Washington, with the aim of supporting emerging artists to develop their skills.
