= Mabel Hardie =

British doctor

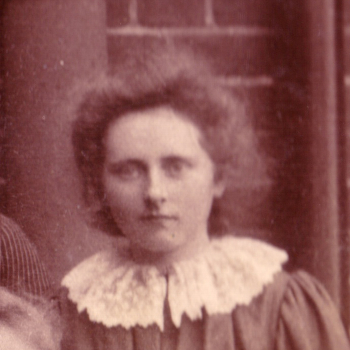
- Mabel Hardie in her first year at Girton College
- Born: 1866; Marple, Cheshire, England
- Died: 1916 (aged 49–50)
- Education: MA, MB ChB; Girton College, Cambridge; Trinity College Dublin; University of Glasgow
- Occupations: Physician, Surgeon

Mabel Hardie (1866–1916) was a British physician and surgeon. She was a war surgeon at the Scottish Women's Hospital and is named in the First World War roll of honour.

== Biography ==
Hardie was born in 1866 at Marple, then in Cheshire, England.

Hardie studied Natural Sciences at Girton College, University of Cambridge, between 1887 and 1890. Because of her work in Cambridge she was awarded an MA by Trinity College Dublin and then went on to train as a doctor at the University of Glasgow, graduating with an MB ChB.

After graduation she was house surgeon at Belgrave Hospital for Children, outdoor doctor and house physician at Leith Hospital, and house surgeon at Glasgow Samaritan Hospital for Women. In November 1907, after a period spent traveling, she settled to a practice at Hampstead.

She was a member of the West London Ethical Society, a forerunner to Humanists UK. She refused to pay taxes and had her gold chain and pictures auctioned instead.

She was arrested for demonstrating in favour of women's suffrage.

When the First World War broke out she joined the Girton and Newnham unit of the Scottish Women's Hospitals, which treated soldiers on active service in France. She served at Troyes in Northern France however she returned to London because of poor health. She died of breast cancer in 1916.
