= Turf Lea =

Coordinates: 53.372°N 2.050°W

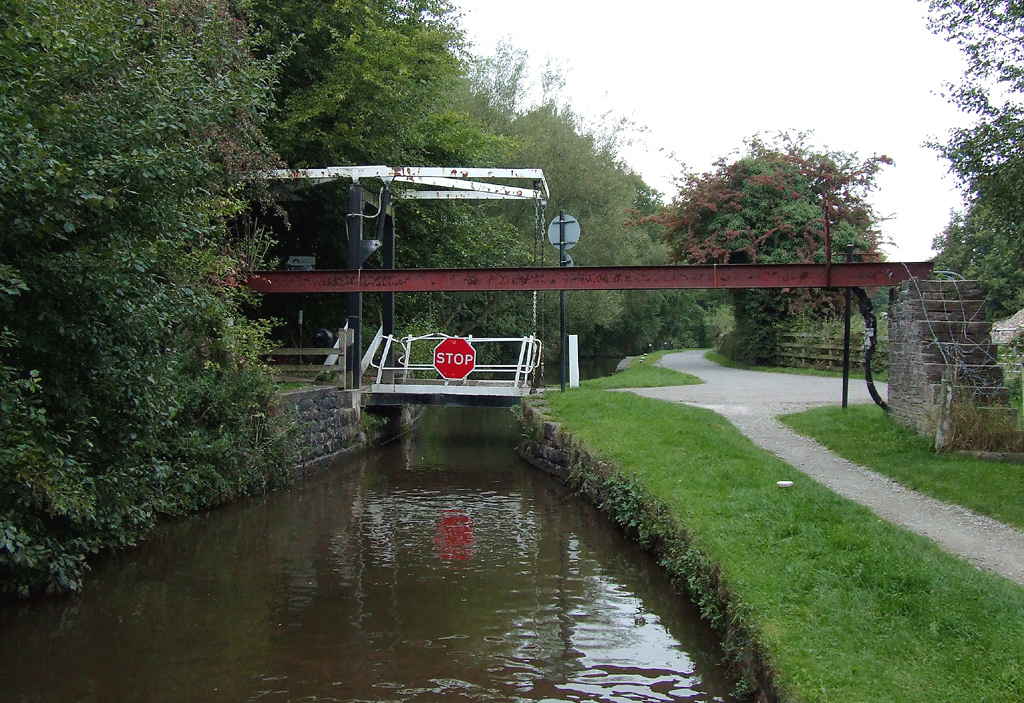
- Turf Lea Liftbridge

- Location within Greater Manchester
- OS grid reference: SJ967860
- Metropolitan borough: Stockport
- Metropolitan county: Greater Manchester
- Region: North West
- Country: England
- Sovereign state: United Kingdom
- Post town: Stockport
- Postcode district: SK6
- Dialling code: 0161
- Police: Greater Manchester
- Fire: Greater Manchester
- Ambulance: North West
- UK Parliament: Hazel Grove

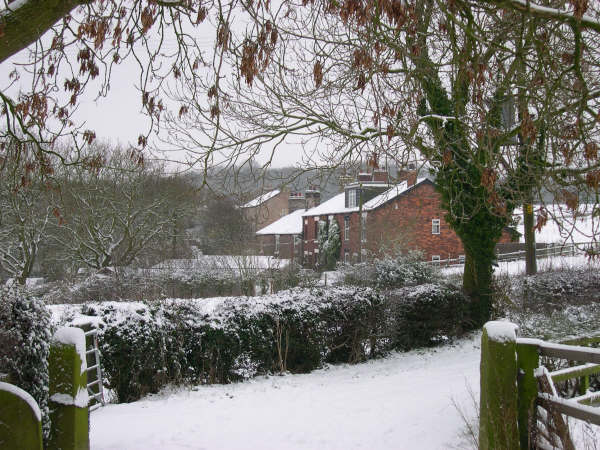
Turf Lea in winter

Turf Lea is a hamlet located at the end of The Ridge, above Marple, in the Metropolitan Borough of Stockport, Greater Manchester, UK.

Nearby is Wybersley Hall, where the author Christopher Isherwood was born.
