= Marple Lock Flight =

Coordinates: 53.406°N 2.064°W

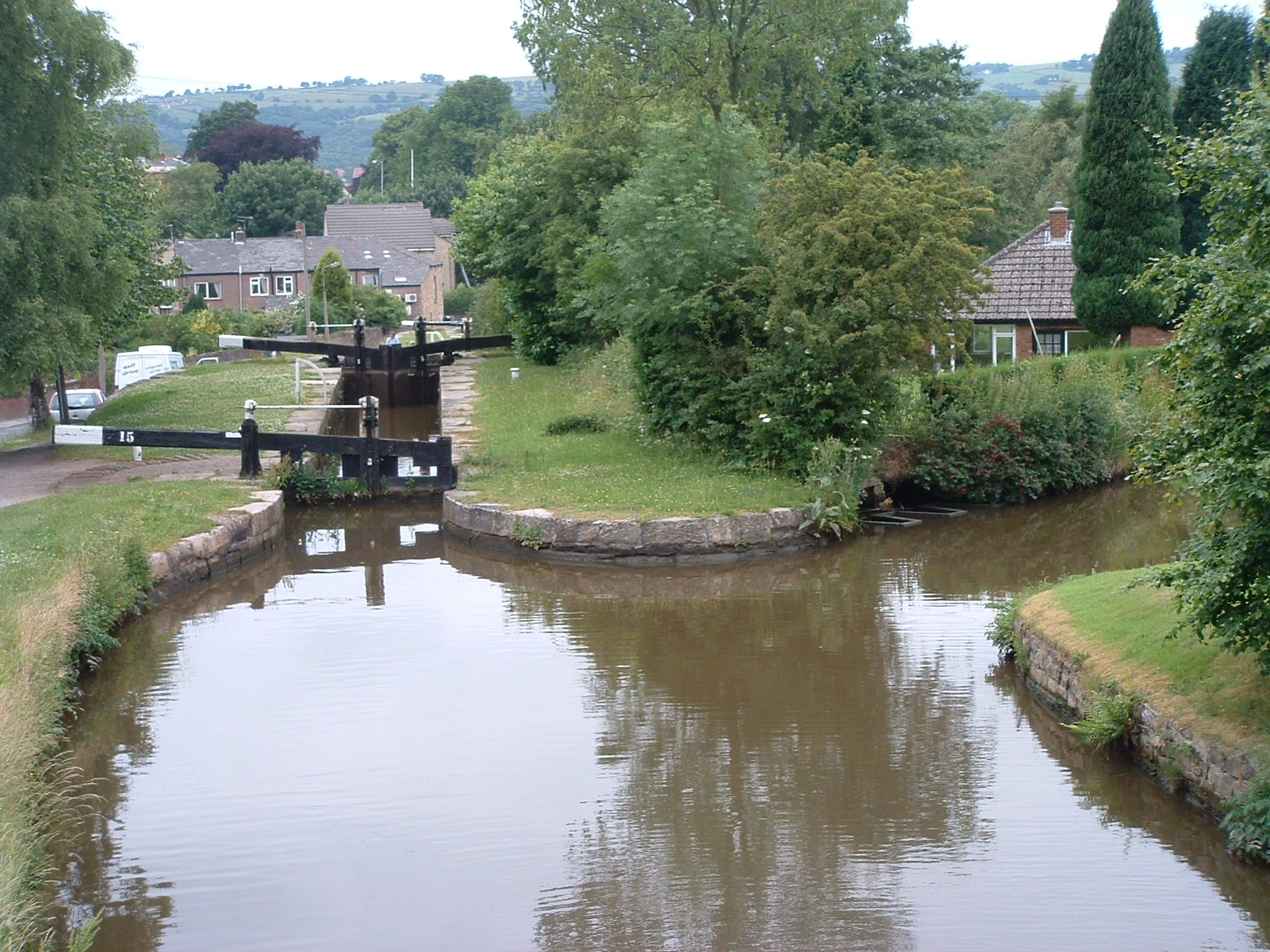
View down from Marple top lock.

Marple Lock Flight is a flight of sixteen canal locks, situated on the Peak Forest Canal in Marple, a suburb of Stockport.

== History ==
Whilst the rest of the canal was opened to navigation by 1796, insufficient money was available to complete the necessary flight of locks to connect the two halves; a temporary tramway was therefore installed until such time as the locks could be completed, which finally happened in 1804.

With the end of commercial carrying, the locks became dilapidated and, by the early 1960s, the flight had become impassible. Pressure in the late 1960s from the Peak Forest Canal Society and the Inland Waterways Association, who wanted to save the Cheshire Ring, resulted in the restoration and re-opening of the flight in 1974.

Today, the location of the flight, with easy access to public transport and its scenic merits so close to a town centre, make it a popular destination with walkers; during the summer, small crowds can often be seen around the locks as boats pass through.

== Features ==
The sixteen locks raise the canal by 209 feet (64 m), over the course of about a mile (1.6 km).

Whilst this is a single flight, it can be divided into three different sections, each with a distinctive environment:

- The lower section (locks 1-8) climbs through 8 locks in a heavily wooded section, with little nearby habitation;
- The middle section (locks 9-12) lies alongside a municipal park, with housing close at hand on the off-side bank;
- The final top section (locks 13-16) rises steeply through four closely spaced locks, with housing on both sides and a road accompanying the canal, to arrive at Marple Junction.
