= Peak Forest Canal =

Canal in Derbyshire/Cheshire/Greater Manchester, England

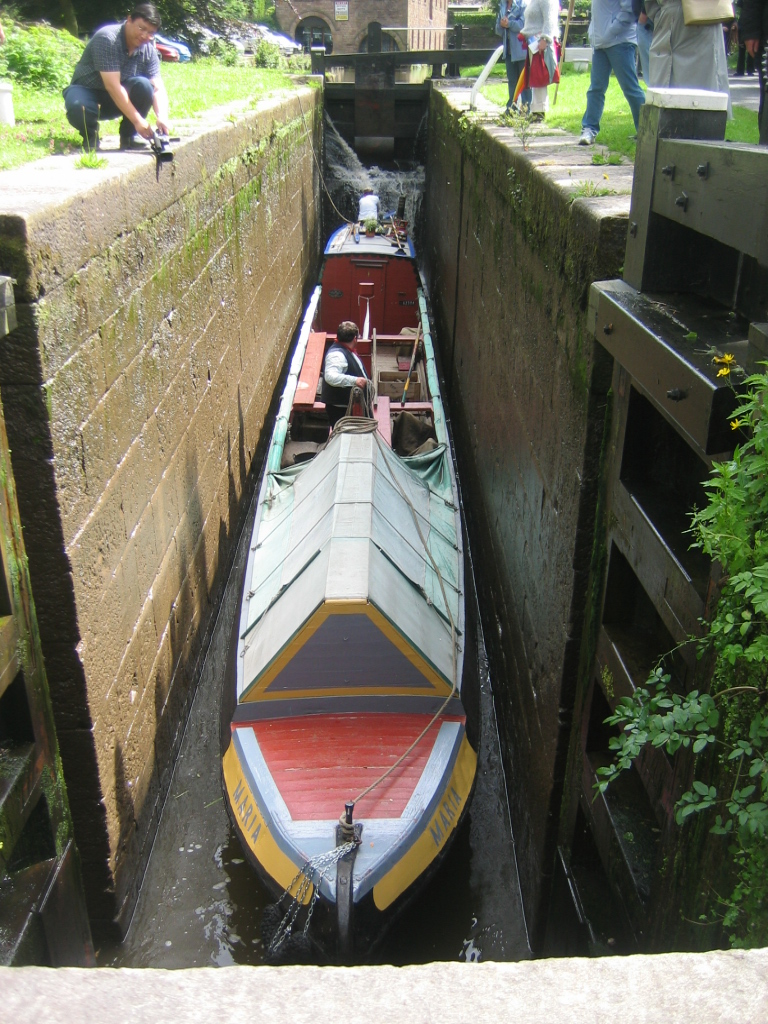
- Horseboat Maria Descending Lock 9 on the Peak Forest Canal
- Interactive map of Peak Forest Canal

Specifications
- Length: 14.8 miles (23.8 km)
- Maximum boat length: 72 ft 0 in (21.95 m)
- Maximum boat beam: 7 ft 0 in (2.13 m)
- Locks: 16
- Status: Navigable
- Navigation authority: Canal & River Trust

History
- Original owner: Peak Forest Canal Company
- Principal engineer: Benjamin Outram
- Other engineer: Thomas Brown
- Date of act: 1794
- Construction began: 1794
- Date of first use: August 1796
- Date completed: 1805
- Date closed: Impassable by early 1960s
- Date restored: 1974

Geography
- Start point: Dukinfield Junction, Ashton-under-Lyne
- End point: Bugsworth Basin, Buxworth
- Branch: Whaley Bridge Branch
- Connects to: Ashton Canal; Macclesfield Canal

The Peak Forest Canal is a narrow (7-foot (2.13 m) gauge) locked artificial waterway in northern England. It is 14.8 miles (23.8 km) long and forms part of the connected English/Welsh inland waterway network.

== Route and features ==
=== General description ===
The canal consists of two level pounds, separated by a flight of 16 locks that raise the canal by 209 feet (64 m) over the course of 1 mile (1.6 km).

The two pounds of the canal are generally known as the Upper Peak Forest Canal and Lower Peak Forest Canal. Whilst there is no evidence that these names were used historically, the designation Lower Peak Forest Canal was used in the British Waterways Act 1983, which redesignated the lower part of the canal as a cruising waterway.

=== Route ===
The Lower Peak Forest Canal heads south from Dukinfield Junction at Dukinfield in Greater Manchester, where it makes a junction with the Ashton Canal at the southern end of the Tame Aqueduct (grid reference SJ934984) through Newton, Hyde, Woodley, Bredbury and Romiley, before crossing the River Goyt on Marple Aqueduct, alongside the railway's Marple Viaduct, to the foot of Marple Locks, a distance of 6.9 miles (11.1 km). The environs are largely rural, passing woods and fields, with some industrial premises encroaching towards the Dukinfield end of the pound.

Whilst the 1 mile (1.6 km) section through Marple Locks is legally a part of the Lower Peak Forest Canal it is often considered as a separate section, raising the canal through 209 feet (64 m) in a partly woodland, partly municipal park and partly urban setting through the centre of Marple, to connect with the Macclesfield Canal at Marple junction.

The Upper Peak Forest Canal is on the same level as that of the upper Macclesfield Canal, allowing boats to cruise from Whaley Bridge or Bugsworth all the way to the top lock at Bosley without having to use a lock. The canal is perched halfway up the valley-side with extensive views of Furness Vale, and the Peak District beyond from Marple through Strines, Disley, New Mills, Furness Vale and Bridgemont. It terminates at Bugsworth Basin, Derbyshire (grid reference SK021820), a distance of 6.9 miles (11.1 km). The village was renamed Buxworth in Victorian times. Recently, the extensive basin has been reopened, and is now a popular venue for visiting boats. There is also a short branch from Bridgemont to the centre of Whaley Bridge, once the site of a connection to the Cromford and High Peak Railway, which ran across the Peak District and joined up with the Cromford Canal.

=== Cruising rings ===
The section from Dukinfield Junction to Marple Junction is part of the Cheshire Ring route.

== History ==
=== Authorisation ===
Peak Forest Canal Act 1794
- Act of Parliament
- Parliament of Great Britain
- Long title: An Act for making and maintaining a navigable canal from and out of the canal navigation from Manchester to or near Ashton-under-Lyne and Oldham, in the county palatine of Lancaster, at the intended aqueduct bridge in Dukinfield, in the county of Chester, to or near to Chapel Milton, in the county of Derby; and a communication by railways or stone roads from thence to Load's Knowl, within Peak Forest, in the said county of Derby; and a branch from and out of the said intended canal to Whaley Bridge, in the said county of Chester.
- Citation: 34 Geo. 3. c. 26
- Territorial extent: Great Britain

Dates
- Royal assent: 28 March 1794
- Commencement: 28 March 1794 (Note: The Acts of Parliament (Commencement) Act 1793.)
Other legislation
Amended by	Sheffield, Ashton-under-Lyne and Manchester Railway Act 1846; Manchester, Sheffield and Lincolnshire Railway Act 1849

Status: Amended

Text of statute as originally enacted

The canal was authorised by the Peak Forest Canal Act 1794 (34 Geo. 3. c. 26) and its purpose was to provide an outlet for the vast limestone deposits around Dove Holes. As Dove Holes is over 1,000 feet (300 m) above sea level, the canal was terminated in a basin at Bugsworth in Derbyshire and the line was continued up to the quarries by means of a gravity-operated feeder tramway, known as the Peak Forest Tramway, which was 6 miles (9.7 km) long.

=== Construction ===
The construction of the canal and tramway was promoted by Samuel Oldknow (the largest shareholder) with much of the finance being provided by Richard Arkwright Junior of Cromford, Derbyshire. The line was surveyed by Thomas Brown and the consulting engineer and resident engineer were Benjamin Outram and Thomas Brown, respectively.

Work was begun first on the section between Ashton and Hyde Hall, where new coal-pits were being opened, so as to derive some income as soon as possible. Outram was somewhat delayed by a request from the committee to report on ideas by Robert Fulton who had been awarded the contract for the cuttings at Werneth. These would have replaced the stone construction of Marple Aqueduct by a somewhat flimsy cast iron trough. Outram, who was experiencing problems with the Holmes Aqueduct on the Derby Canal, was well aware of potential weaknesses. Fulton had also suggested the use of small tub boats rather than conventional narrow boats, and an inclined plane at Marple instead of locks. Outram having privately voiced his disquiet, Fulton's plans were quietly dropped.

At the same time as Outram was working on the lower end, he came under pressure to make progress on the section Bugsworth to Marple, and Samuel Oldknow's coal-pits and lime kilns. Splitting the work in this way possibly contributed to the £1,100 overspend recorded in 1795, though there were problems getting the shareholders to meet their commitments. By 1796 this had risen to £4,000, but in August the tramway and the canal opened to Marple.

Nevertheless, at the end of 1796, funds from investors were still insufficient to finish the locks and the aqueduct at Marple and Outram was asked to suggest a temporary alternative. He produced two solutions, one to cross the arches of the aqueduct, the other assuming that the arches were unfinished. It was decided not to interfere with the ongoing construction of the aqueduct, so the railway ran from its Marple end to the proposed top lock. The arches of the aqueduct were completed in November 1798—and the workers were given a "handsome treat" in celebration—being finally completed towards the end of 1799.

However, there was still a great of work to be done at the lower end—the driving of Hyde Bank Tunnel proving a particular problem—and the railway and aqueduct saw little use until the canal finally opened along its full length in 1800.

=== Operation ===
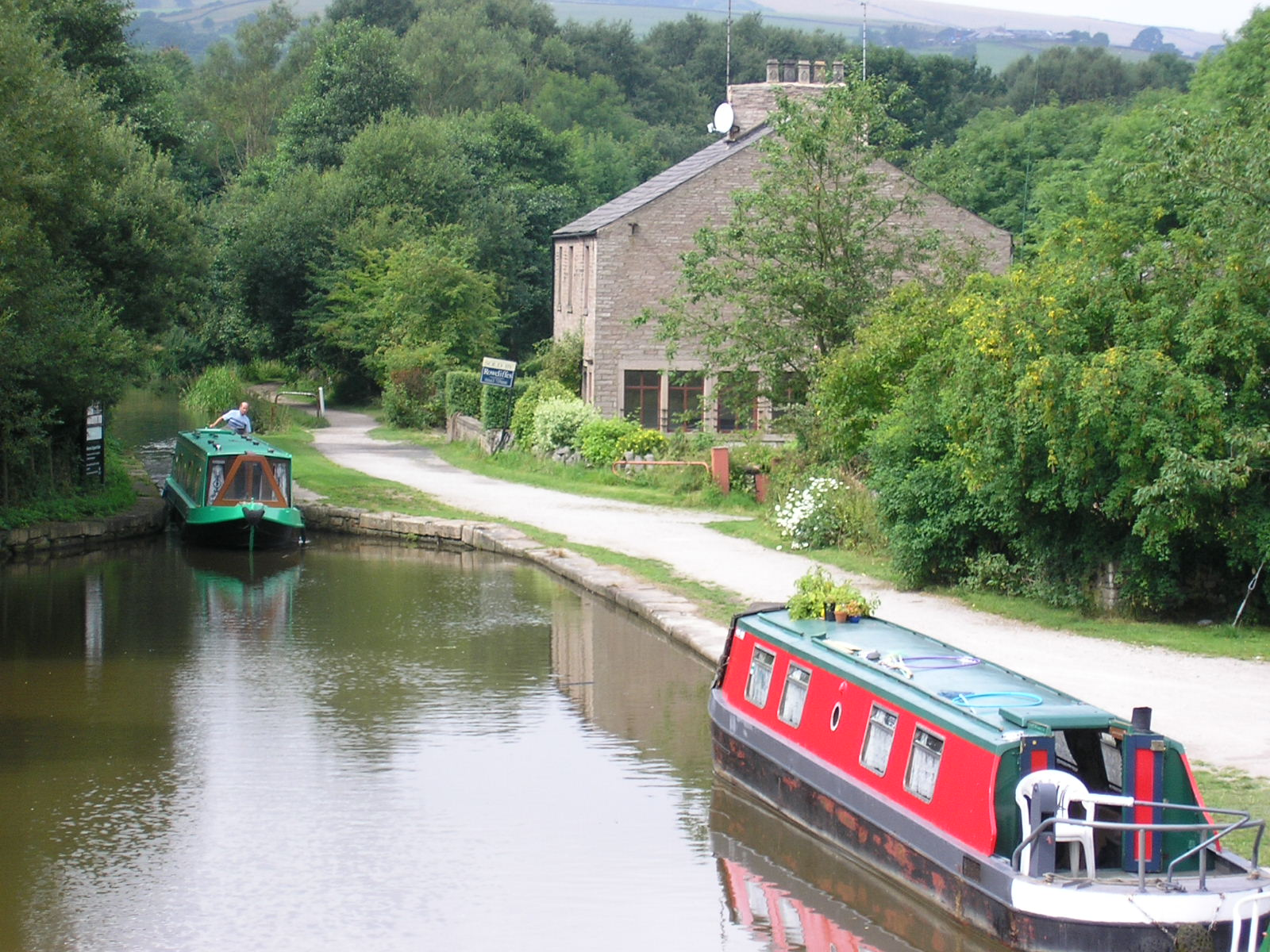
The Gauging Stop Place and Wharfinger's house at Bugsworth Basin

The upper level of the canal and tramway opened for trade on 31 August 1796 and Bugsworth Basin soon became a bustling interchange between the tramway and canal.

Brown and Outram's efforts were much assisted by the appointment of Gernan Wheatcroft to manage the canal at Bugsworth and Whaley Bridge. He proved so efficient that he was able to use the threat of resignation to gain the addition of £30 to his £75 a year salary to keep and maintain a horse to assist him in his duties. In a move that would not disgrace a modern marketing organisation, the quarry owners retained Outram's future father-in-law, Dr. James Anderson, the Scottish agricultural expert, to write a treatise on the benefits of lime in farming, which they published.

Trade increased rapidly and it was becoming necessary to double the railways. Attracting suitable labour was also a problem. Cottages were rented to convert into dormitories, and Wheatcroft opened a shop where goods could be purchased cheaply. At one point, the employers offered "a good flannel waistcoat and trousers" for each worker, plus a jug of ale each day.

The Marple railway was still a serious bottleneck. The canal company still lacked funds to complete the Marple locks and the Combs Reservoir that would be necessary. A petition to Parliament was considered but, finally, £24,000 was borrowed from Samuel Oldknow and Arkwright and the work was completed in 1805.

At Bugsworth, limestone brought down the tramway was either put into boats to be taken to Manchester and beyond or it was put into lime kilns to be burnt to produce quick lime. The trade in limestone and quick lime (also known as burnt lime), as well as the transport of coal into the basin for firing the kilns, accounted for the greatest proportion of the Canal Company's income.

=== Decline ===
With the coming of the railways, the canal began to lose its business and in the 1920s the Peak Forest Tramway and Bugsworth Basin closed. Later, the lower level of the canal and Marple locks fell into disuse, to the extent that by the early 1960s the lower part of the canal was impassable.

=== Restoration ===
In the late 1960s and early 1970s, the Peak Forest Canal Society and the Inland Waterways Association campaigned for the restoration of the Peak Forest and Ashton Canals, and they reopened on 1 April 1974. The Lower Peak Forest Canal, from Dukinfield Junction to Marple, was one of seven stretches of canal formally designated as remainder waterways that were re-classified by the British Waterways Act 1983 of 8 February 1983. Under the act, a total of 82 route miles (132 km) were upgraded to Cruising Waterway Standard.

Bugsworth Basin remained derelict for much longer, but was the subject of long-term restoration attempts by the Inland Waterways Protection Society. It was finally re-opened to navigation in 2003 after professional restoration work was undertaken by British Waterways.

In October 2021, lock numbers 5, 7, 9 and 16 were among 142 sites across England to receive part of a £35-million grant from the government's Culture Recovery Fund.

== See also ==
- Narrowboat

== Bibliography ==
- Schofield, R.B., (2000) Benjamin Outram, Cardiff: Merton Priory Press
- Ripley, D., (1989) "The Peak Forest Tramway including the Peak Forest Canal" Oakwood Press
