= Cheshire Ring =

Canal ring in North West England

Coordinates: 53°28′47″N 2°13′44″W

- Schematic of the Cheshire Ring
- Interactive map of Cheshire Ring

Specifications
- Length: 97 miles (156 km)
- Locks: 92
- Status: Canal ring
- Navigation authority: Canal & River Trust & Peel Holdings

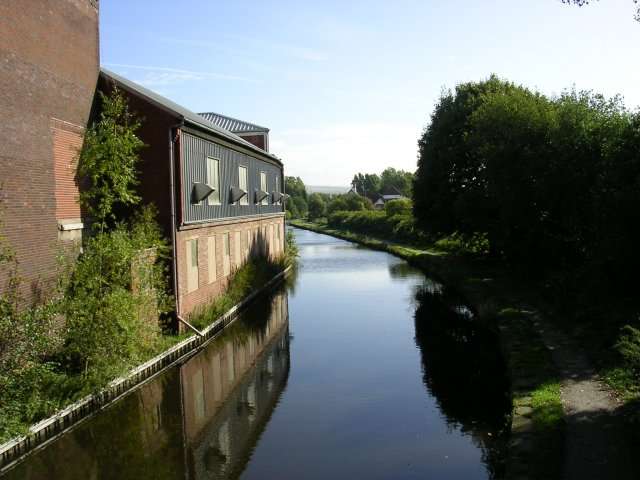
Ashton Canal at Droylsden

The Cheshire Ring is a canal cruising circuit or canal ring, which includes sections of six canals in and around Cheshire and Greater Manchester in North West England: the Ashton Canal, Peak Forest Canal, Macclesfield Canal, Trent and Mersey Canal, Bridgewater Canal, and Rochdale Canal.

Because it takes boats approximately one week to complete the circuit, it is suited to narrowboat holidays that start at and return to the same location. The route has 92 locks and is 97 miles (156 km) long. It passes through contrasting landscapes between Manchester city centre and rural Cheshire with views of the Peak District and the Cheshire Plain.

== History ==
The term "Cheshire Ring" first appeared in the Inland Waterways Association (IWA) Bulletin in 1965, where it was coined as part of a campaign to prevent the abandonment of, and restore navigation to, part of what had been known as the Peak Forest Circular Route between Manchester and Marple. When commercial carrying declined after the Second World War, sections of the Rochdale, Ashton, and Peak Forest canals that make up the urban part of the ring had gradually fallen into disuse, and by the early 1960s were impassable, with little depth of water and many locks in an unusable condition. There was a risk that the canals would be abandoned, and infilled, as they were becoming stinking eyesores. Perseverance by the IWA and the Peak Forest Canal Society paid off, and on 1 April 1974, following restoration, the ring was re-opened to navigation.

The Rochdale Canal (unlike most other canals in England) was not nationalised in 1947, and remained in the ownership of the Rochdale Canal Company. Both the Rochdale Canal and Bridgewater Canal escaped nationalisation as a result of being owned subsidiaries of the Manchester Ship Canal company.

In 2002, as part of the restoration of the Rochdale, ownership of the Rochdale Canal Company passed to the Waterways Trust, and British Waterways became the navigation authority, bringing to an end the £35 toll that had been charged to use the one-mile section through Manchester which had deterred some boats from attempting the ring.

== Cheshire Ring Race ==
Since 1977, a marathon-style 96-mile (154 km) canoeing race has been organized called the Cheshire Ring Race. Traversing five canals, it starts and finishes at Higher Poynton on the Macclesfield Canal. Participation is open to individual paddlers, crew boats and relay teams. The race is held under the aegis of Macclesfield And District Canoe Club (MADCC).

== Component canals and places ==
Canals and places on each (clockwise from Ducie St Junction, just north of Manchester Piccadilly station):

- Ashton Canal: Ancoats, Clayton, Droylsden, Audenshaw, Ashton-under-Lyne
- Peak Forest Canal: Dukinfield, Hyde, Woodley, Bredbury, Romiley, Marple
- Macclesfield Canal: High Lane, Higher Poynton, Bollington, Macclesfield, Bosley, Congleton
- Trent and Mersey Canal: Kidsgrove, Church Lawton, Rode Heath, Wheelock, Middlewich, Northwich, Anderton
- Bridgewater Canal: Preston Brook, Lymm, Sale
- Rochdale Canal: Manchester
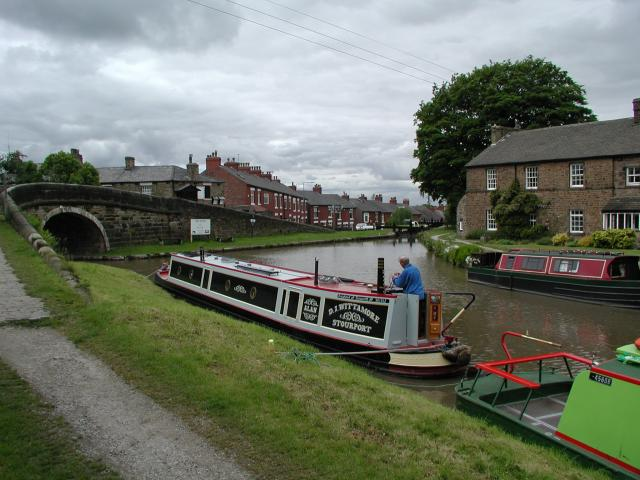
Marple Junction

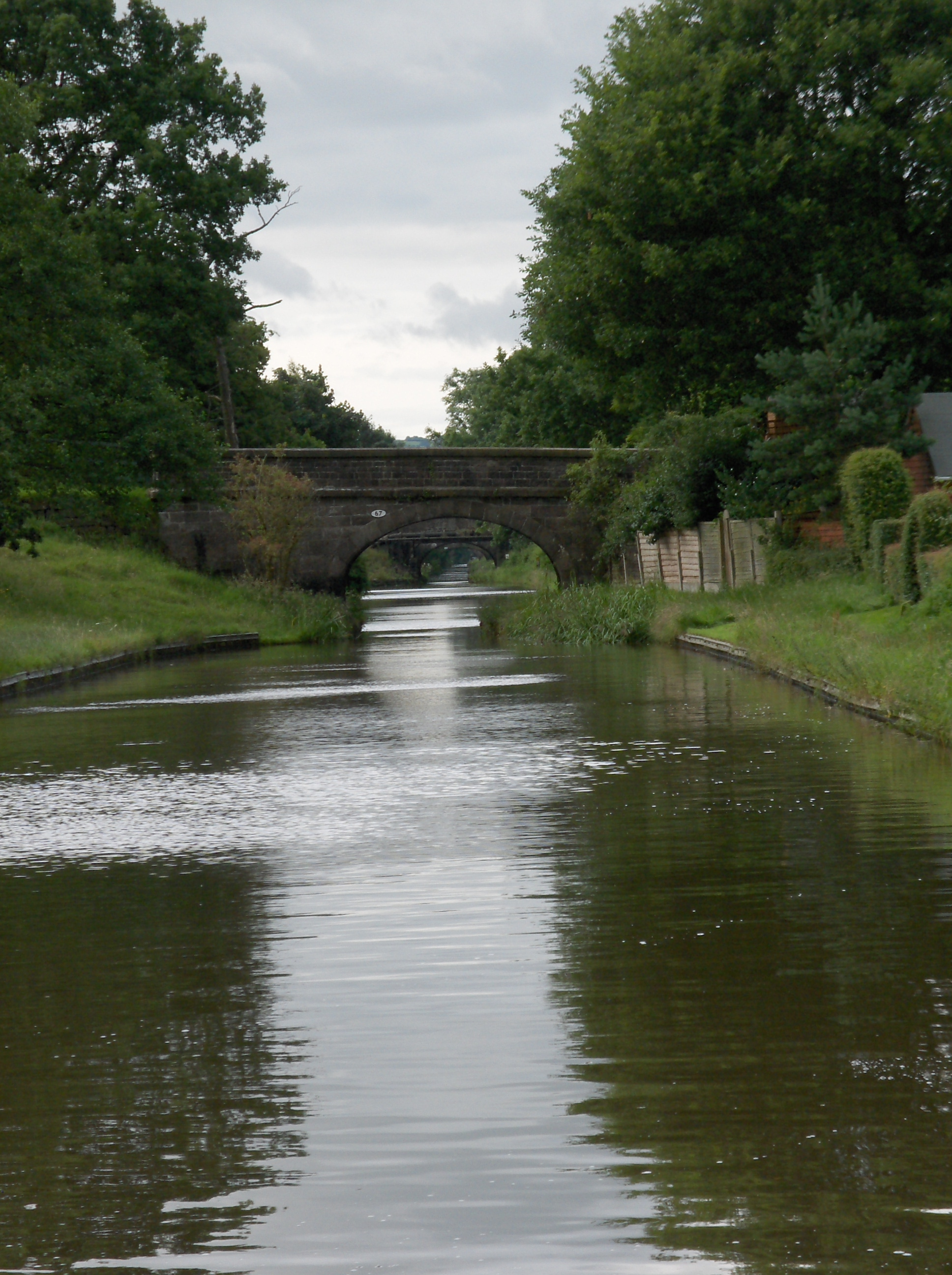
Near Congleton

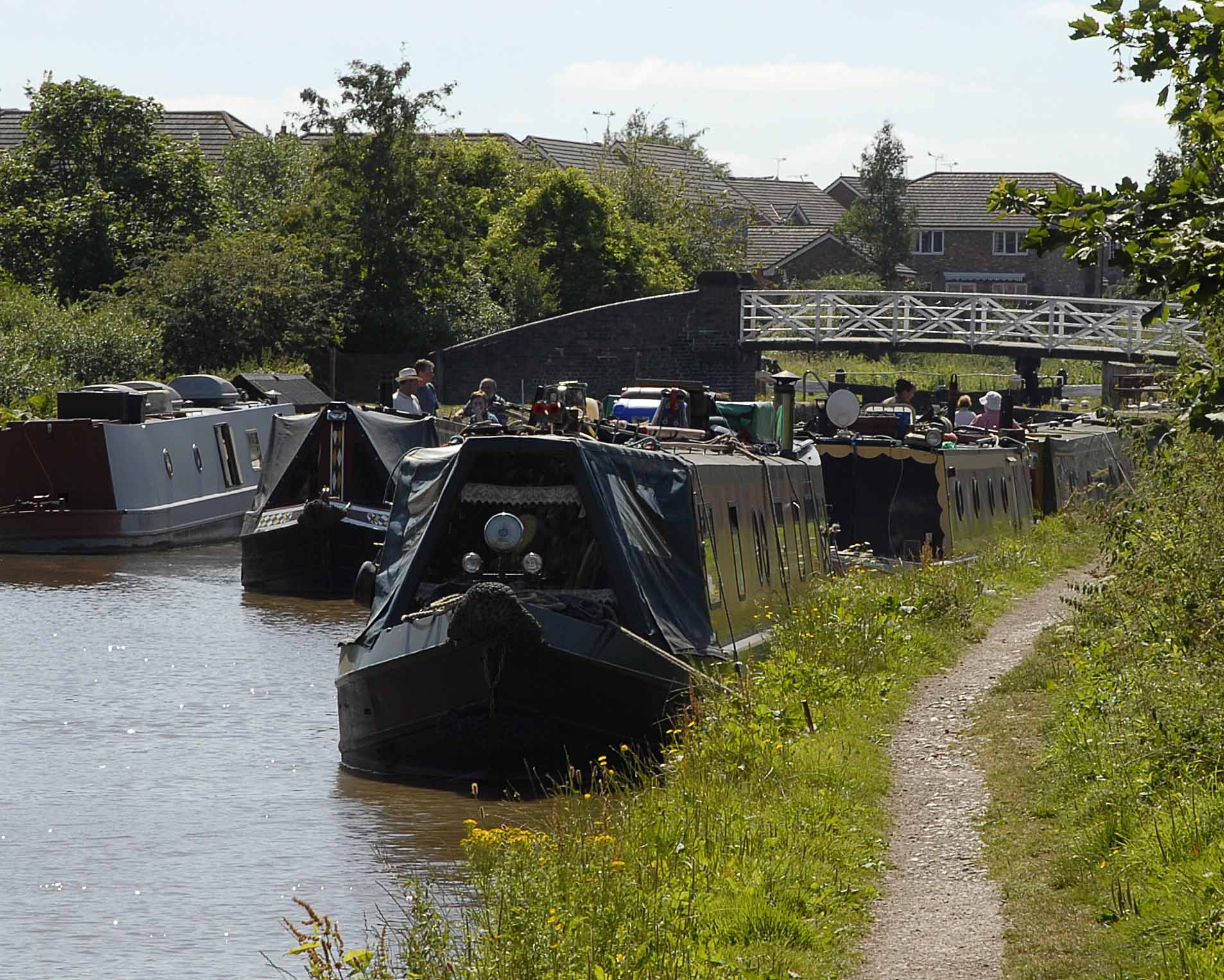
Just to the Northwich side of the Big Lock, Middlewich

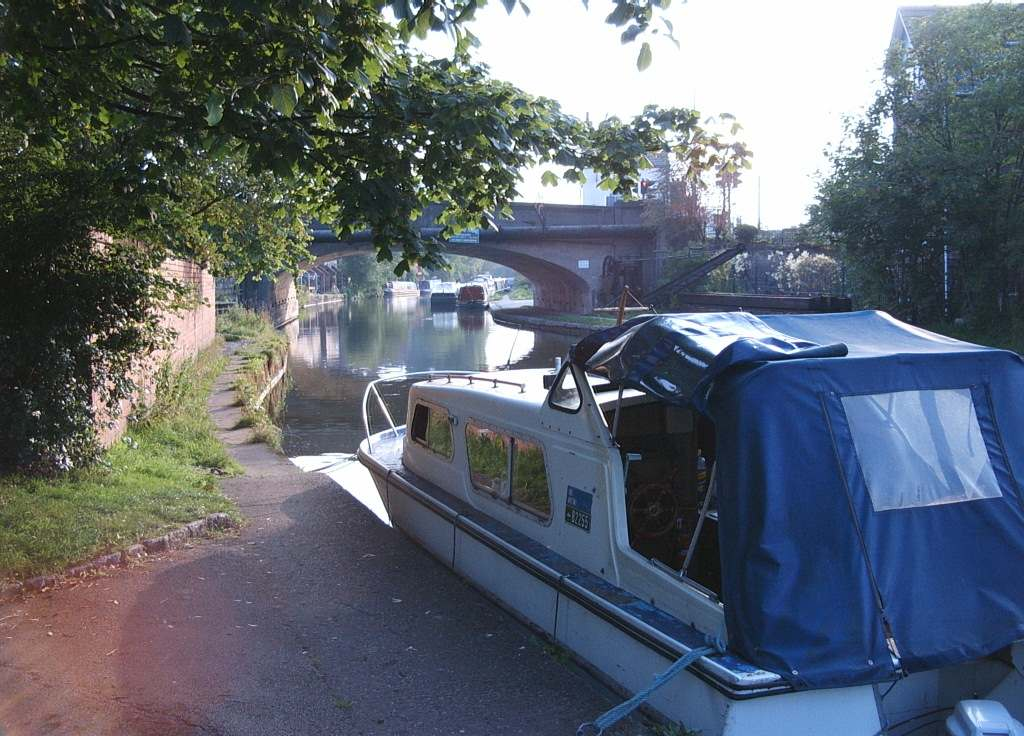
Bridgewater Canal at Stockton Heath

== See also ==
- Canals of the United Kingdom
- History of the British canal system
