= Marple, Greater Manchester =

Town in Greater Manchester, England

Coordinates: 53.397°N 2.061°W

Marple
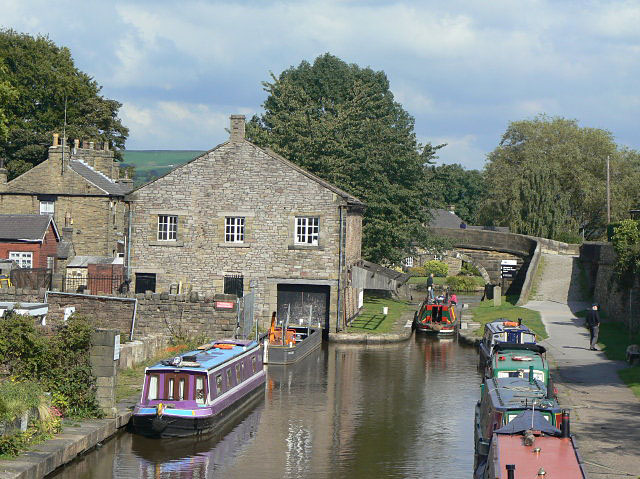
- Marple Wharf

- Location within Greater Manchester
- Area: 34.67 km^{2} (13.39 sq mi)
- Population: 12,970 (Built up area, 2021)
  - Density: 374/km^{2} (970/sq mi)
- OS grid reference: SJ971893
  - London: 154.5 mi (248.6 km)
- Metropolitan borough: Stockport
- Metropolitan county: Greater Manchester
- Region: North West
- Country: England
- Sovereign state: United Kingdom
- Post town: STOCKPORT
- Postcode district: SK6
- Dialling code: 0161
- Police: Greater Manchester
- Fire: Greater Manchester
- Ambulance: North West
- UK Parliament: Hazel Grove

Marple is a town in the Metropolitan Borough of Stockport, Greater Manchester, England. It is on the River Goyt, 9 miles (14 km) south-east of Manchester, 9 miles (14 km) north of Macclesfield and 4 miles (6 km) south-east of Stockport. At the 2021 census, the built up area had a population of 12,970.

It lies within the historic county boundaries of Cheshire (although its district Marple Bridge was historically partially in Derbyshire), and became part of Greater Manchester in 1974. The town lies along the Peak Forest Canal, which contains the Marple Lock Flight and Marple Aqueduct. The Roman Lakes, to the south-east of the town centre, attracts anglers and walkers. The town is served by two railway stations: Marple and Rose Hill Marple, providing access to the rail network in Greater Manchester, a direct line to Sheffield and beyond. It is also close to the Middlewood Way, a shared use path following the former Macclesfield, Bollington and Marple Railway line south from Rose Hill to Macclesfield.

== History ==
=== Toponymy ===
The first reference to Marple in written history was to Merpel, believed to be derived from the Old English maere pill, meaning 'the stream at the boundary'.

=== Early history ===
Scientists estimate that the earliest residents of the area settled several millennia ago. There are clues to their existence around the Ludworth area where there are standing stones and tumuli. This was confirmed around 1998 when an archaeological dig in Mellor revealed many clues about the existence of Marple's earliest residents.

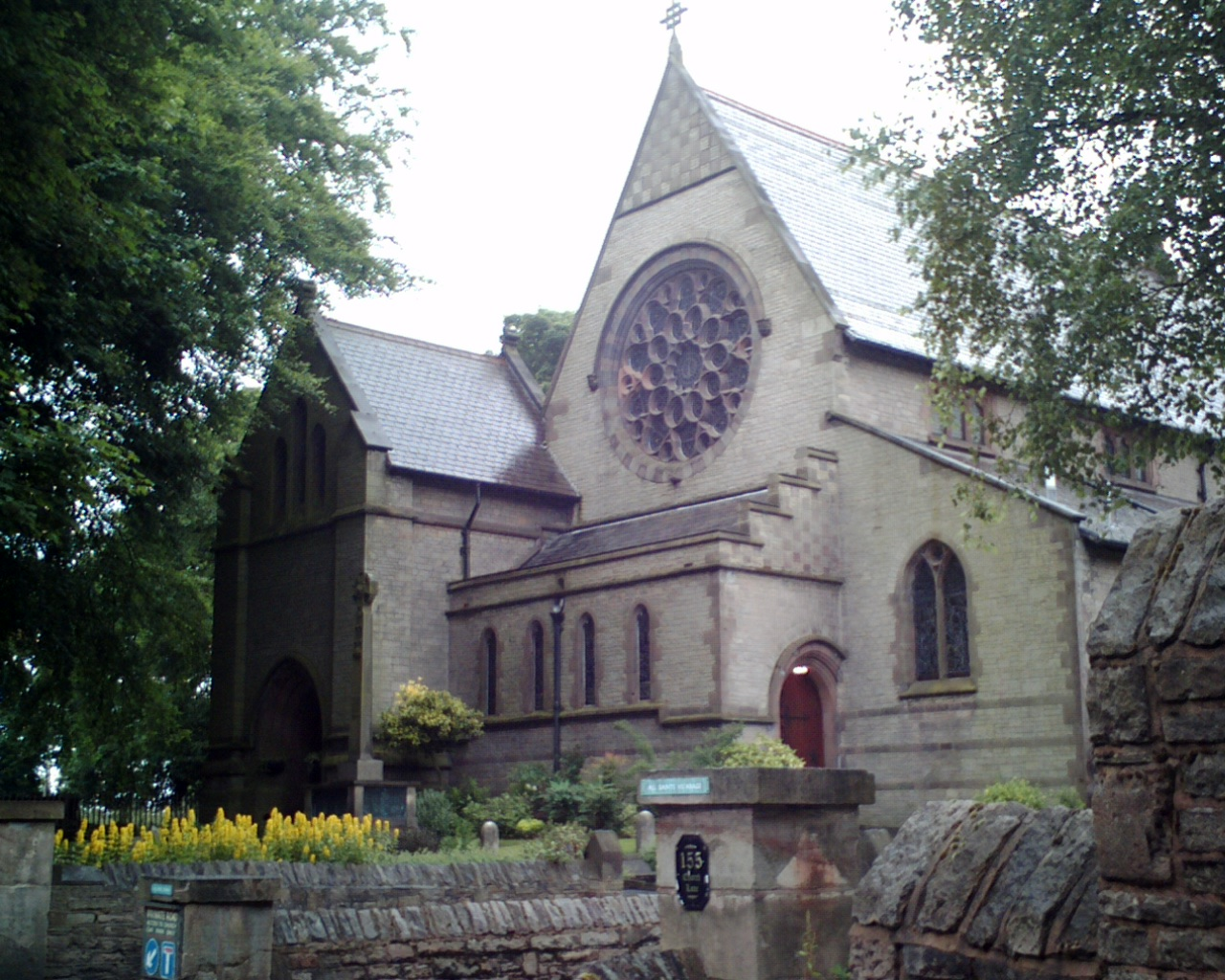
All Saints' Church, a grade II listed building from 1880

The area was predominantly within the Macclesfield Forest, and was omitted from the Domesday Book survey. The first mention of the area was in 1122 in a deed for the sale of land. In 1220 the land passed to the Vernon family where it remained for several generations. The pre–Industrial Revolution inhabitants of the village mostly worked on small farms and others specialised in linen weaving and hatting. After 1790, Samuel Oldknow transformed much of this lifestyle, with the construction of lime kilns and mills as part of the Industrial Revolution. The population of the village began to rise, with the construction of terraces to house mill workers and the formation of a village centre filled with private businesses.

Samuel Oldknow also played a large role in the development of the town in addition to his mills; there is still a street named Oldknow Road in Marple today. He built workers' cottages and churches, introduced aspen trees to the area, and assisted in the constructions of the Macclesfield and Peak Forest Canals. Marple Aqueduct, which opened in 1800, carries the Peak Forest Canals over the River Goyt, was designed by Benjamin Outram, a pioneer in the building of canals and tramways. Seven men lost their lives during its construction. Samuel Oldknow died in 1828; his mill was destroyed by fire in 1892. These navigations accelerated Marple's growth, but eventually declined into disrepair when the railway arrived in 1865. They have since been restored for use by leisure narrowboats, now forming part of the Cheshire Ring.

=== Recent history ===
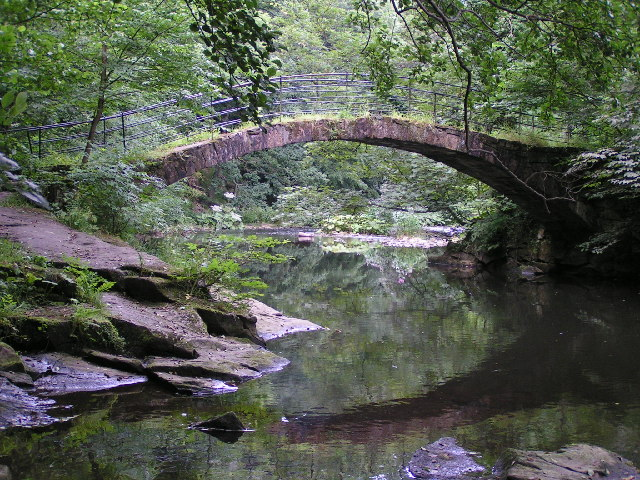
Footbridge over the River Goyt

In the early 1900s the town prospered from the success of cotton in nearby Stockport and Manchester; the canals in the area served as a link with other industrial towns. Marple grew as a residential suburb of Stockport after the arrival of frequent bus and rail services in the 1920s.

== Geography ==
The area, close to Derbyshire, covers just over 11 square miles (28 km^{2}) of countryside, ranging from heavily wooded valleys to hill-top moorland. It rises from around 262 feet (80 m) above sea level at the River Goyt to 1,073 feet (327 m) at Cobden Edge. On a clear day it is possible to view the Beetham Tower in Manchester as well as the city centre, the Winter Hill TV transmitter and the surrounding counties of Cheshire, Derbyshire, Lancashire and West Yorkshire and the mountains of North Wales from the top of these hills.

== Governance ==
There is one main tier of local government covering Marple, at metropolitan borough level: Stockport Metropolitan Borough Council. The council is a member of the Greater Manchester Combined Authority, which is led by the directly-elected Mayor of Greater Manchester. Two wards for council elections are named after Marple: Marple North and Marple South and High Lane. For national elections, Marple forms part of the Hazel Grove constituency.

=== Administrative history ===
Marple was historically a township and chapelry in the ancient parish of Stockport, which formed part of the Macclesfield Hundred of Cheshire. From the 17th century onwards, parishes were gradually given various civil functions under the poor laws, in addition to their original ecclesiastical functions. In some cases, including Stockport, the civil functions were exercised by each township separately rather than the parish as a whole. In 1866, the legal definition of 'parish' was changed to be the areas used for administering the poor laws, and so Marple also became a civil parish.

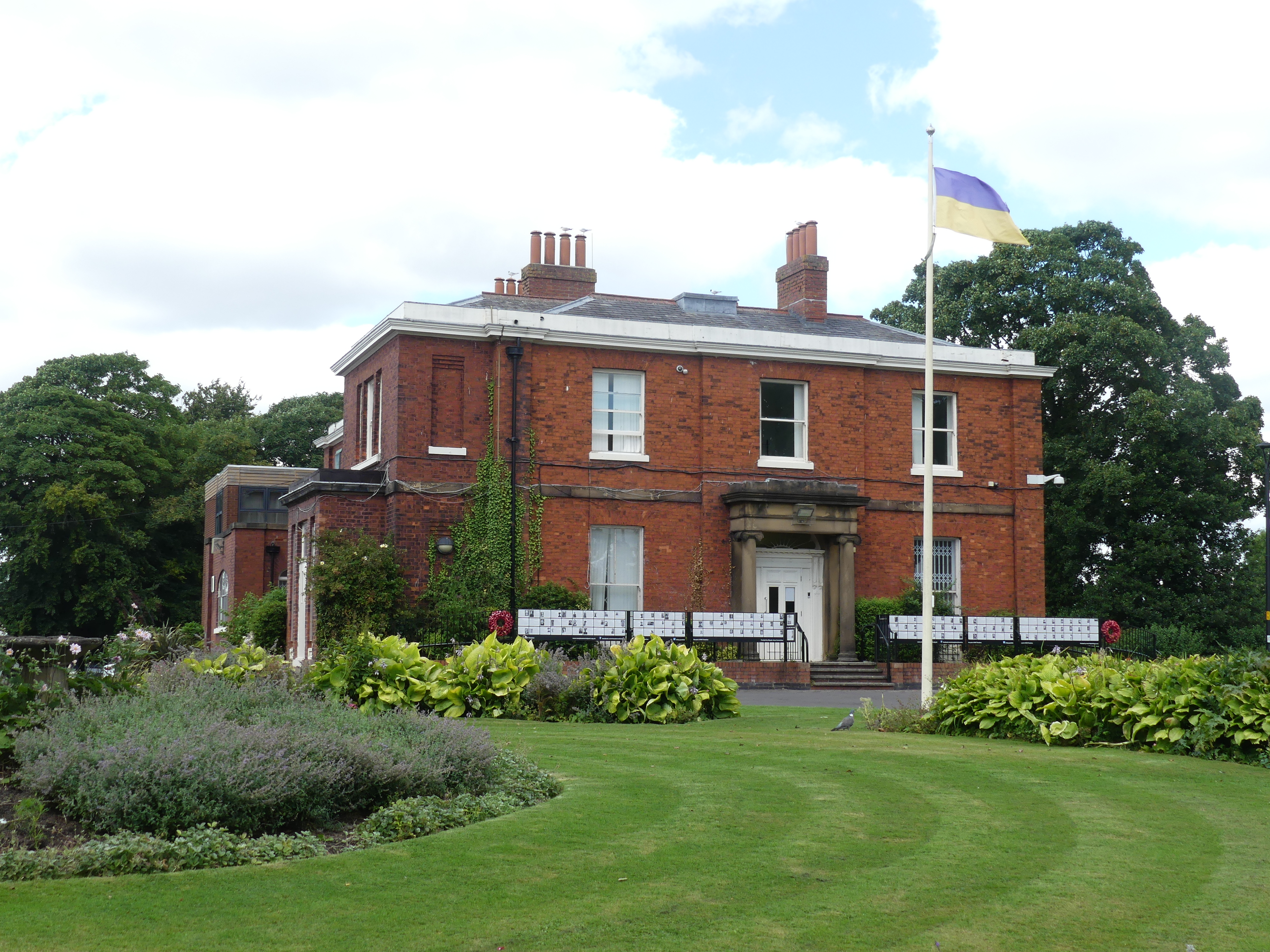
Hollins House: Headquarters of Marple Urban District Council from 1922–1974

In 1875, Marple was made a local government district, administered by an elected local board. Such districts were reconstituted as urban districts under the Local Government Act 1894. In 1922, Marple Urban District Council bought Hollins House to serve as its headquarters; the grounds of the house were gifted to the council at the same time by the Carver family for converting into Marple Memorial Park, being Marple's war memorial.

The urban district was significantly enlarged in 1936 to take in the area of the two neighbouring parishes of Ludworth (which included Marple Bridge) and Mellor. Ludworth and Mellor were on the east bank of the River Goyt, and had been in Derbyshire prior to being transferred into Marple.

Marple Urban District was abolished in 1974 under the Local Government Act 1972. The area became part of the Metropolitan Borough of Stockport in Greater Manchester.

=== Public services ===
Water is supplied to the area by United Utilities. The nearest NHS hospital is Stepping Hill in Stockport, which is run by the Stockport NHS Foundation Trust. Marple has a police station, served by Greater Manchester Police, close to the library and Memorial Park. It also has a fire station, run by Greater Manchester Fire and Rescue Service, located behind the Asda supermarket in the town centre.

== Culture and community ==
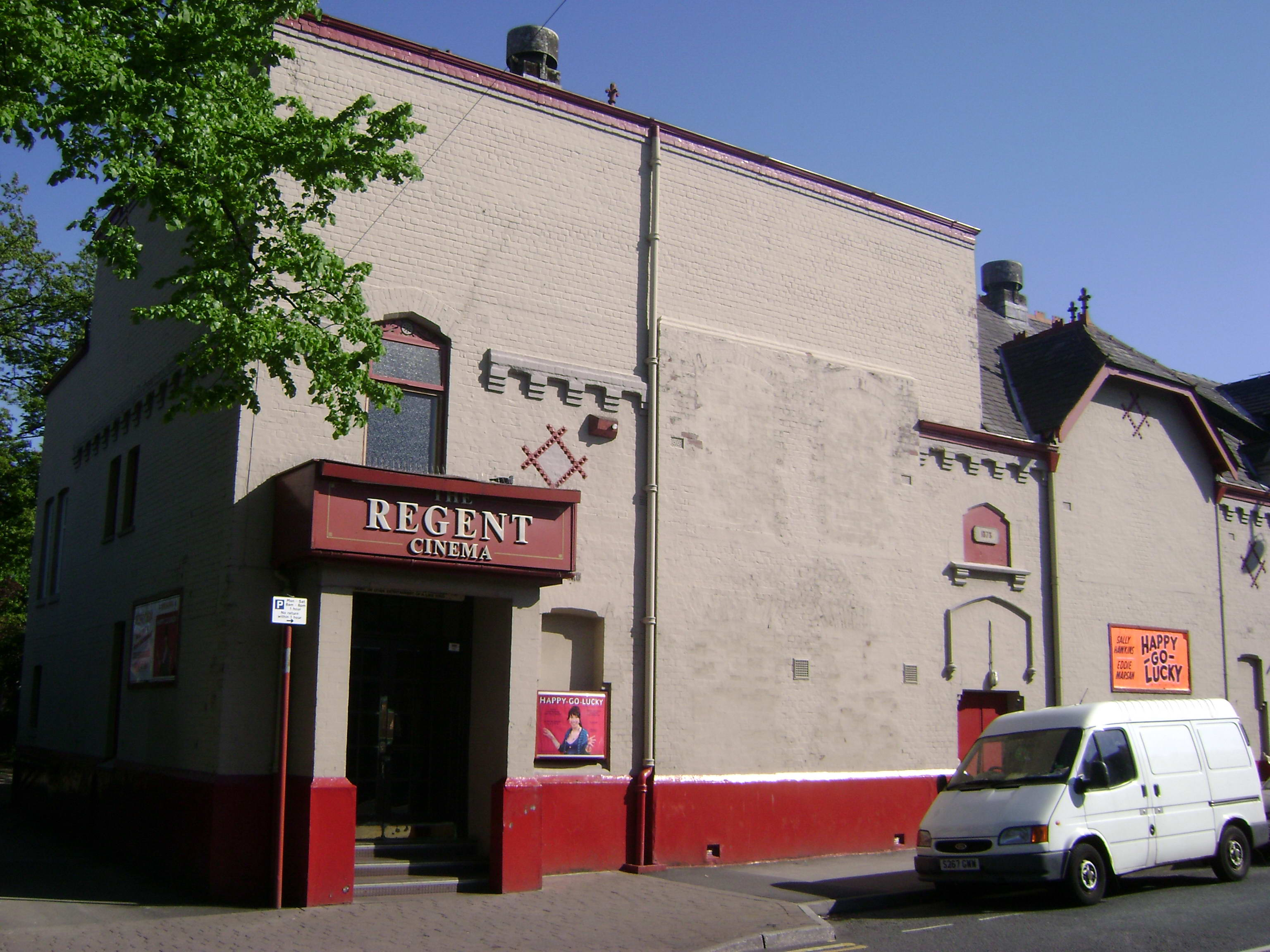
Regent Cinema, Marple

Since 1932, Marple has had a cinema in a building designed in 1878 as a place of worship or refuge. The building was purchased in 1932 by the 'Marple Cinema Company' and became the Regent Cinema. It remains open as one of the few independent cinemas in the UK.

The town has two brass bands: the Marple Band and the Hawk Green (Marple) Band.

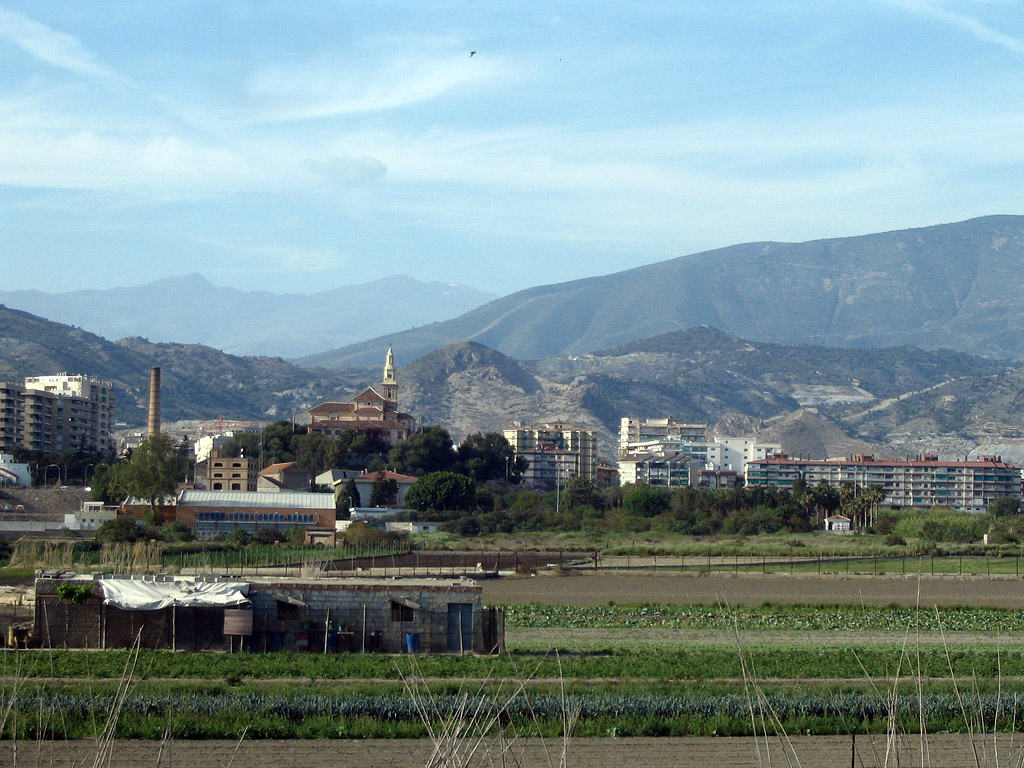
Motril, Spain, twinned with Marple

Marple is twinned with the town Motril in the province of Granada in Spain.

=== Media ===
Local news and television programmes are provided by Salford-based BBC North West and ITV Granada. Television signals are received from the Winter Hill TV transmitter.

Local radio stations are BBC Radio Manchester, Heart North West, Smooth North West, Capital Manchester and Lancashire, Greatest Hits Radio Manchester & The North West and Your FM, a community-based station which broadcast from Stockport.

The town is served by the local newspaper the Manchester Evening News.

=== Film appearances ===
In 2008, Marple was used as the setting for the BBC drama Sunshine.

Marple featured in a 2010 BBC documentary on Dr Beeching which described the long-term effects of axing much of the UK railway network in the 1960s. The programme highlighted the transport issues and how getting a direct train from Marple to Stockport was now impossible and the road traffic made the journey one of the most difficult in the UK.

== Landmarks ==
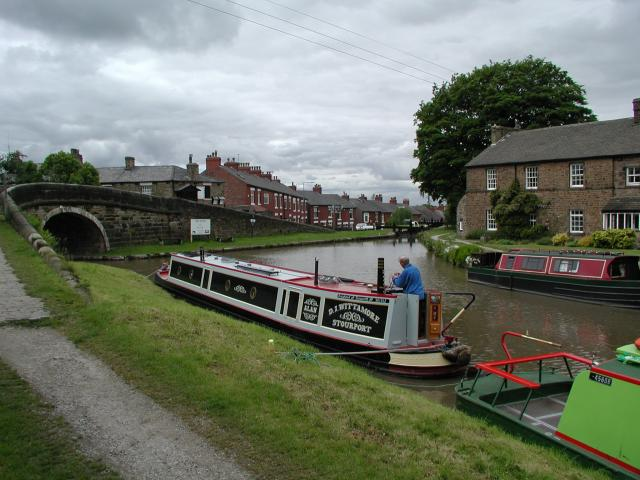
Junction of Peak Forest Canal and the Macclesfield Canal in Marple

Marple is notable for its series of 16 canal locks, known as Marple Lock Flight, close to the village centre. The Peak Forest Canal skirts the village, north running alongside Marple Memorial Park and Brabyns Park until it reaches the Marple Aqueduct and on to Dukinfield Junction, and south towards Bugsworth Basin. Macclesfield Canal meets the Peak Forest Canal at Marple Junction, and heads towards Birmingham. The two canals form part of the Cheshire Ring canal system; the canals served as a vital link during the Industrial Revolution. Nowadays they provide an area of relaxation for walkers, anglers and boaters.

The Roman Lakes leisure complex, in the valley bottom close to Strines, is popular with walkers, anglers, nature lovers and horse riders. The area was named in the Victorian era as an attraction to tourists, not because it had links with the Romans (also true of Roman Bridge, a packhorse bridge over the Goyt). In the area closest to the river there was a mill built by Samuel Oldknow and destroyed by fire in 1892. In 2011, volunteers uncovered the wheelpit and entrance footings to the mill and are currently seeking funds to continue the exploration. The wheelpit, which when built was the largest in the world, is now viewable.

The Middlewood Way is a 10-mile walking and cycling path between Marple and Macclesfield, following the line of the former Macclesfield, Bollington and Marple Railway.

=== Marple Hall ===
Marple Hall was close to where Marple Hall School now stands. The remains of the hall can be explored, though very little remains. The hall was the ancestral home of the Bradshaws and passed to the Isherwoods. It was demolished in 1959 after it was offered to the council in 1954 by the writer Christopher Isherwood, who had inherited it. By this time the hall had been ransacked by vandals and looters. Much of the estate is now residential housing or the school. The old hall foundations can be seen on the corner of Marple Hall Drive. There is a plaque on a piece of stone, the only remaining lintel from the house. The shutters from its windows are restored and on display in Marple Library. The hall overlooked the River Goyt and it is still possible to walk from there to the river following a pathway which once led to the Dooley Lane entrance to the estate. Nearby Brabyn's Hall suffered a similar fate. Wyberslegh Hall, now in private ownership, stood ruined for a time.

In a letter, Agatha Christie wrote to a fan that while she was staying with a sister in Cheshire (her elder sister Margaret "Madge" had married Sir James Watt of Abney Hall) they went to a sale at Marple Hall. There Christie bought two Jacobean oak chairs which she still possessed at the time of writing and, wanting a name for her old-maid character in The Thirteen Problems, she thought of Jane Marple. Two Jacobean armchairs can still be found at Christie's Greenway Estate, but the sale took place in July 1929, over a year after the first Miss Marple stories from The Thirteen Problems were first published in The Royal Magazine.

== Transport ==
The town falls within the Greater Manchester Passenger Transport Executive area, with public transport provided by Transport for Greater Manchester (TfGM).

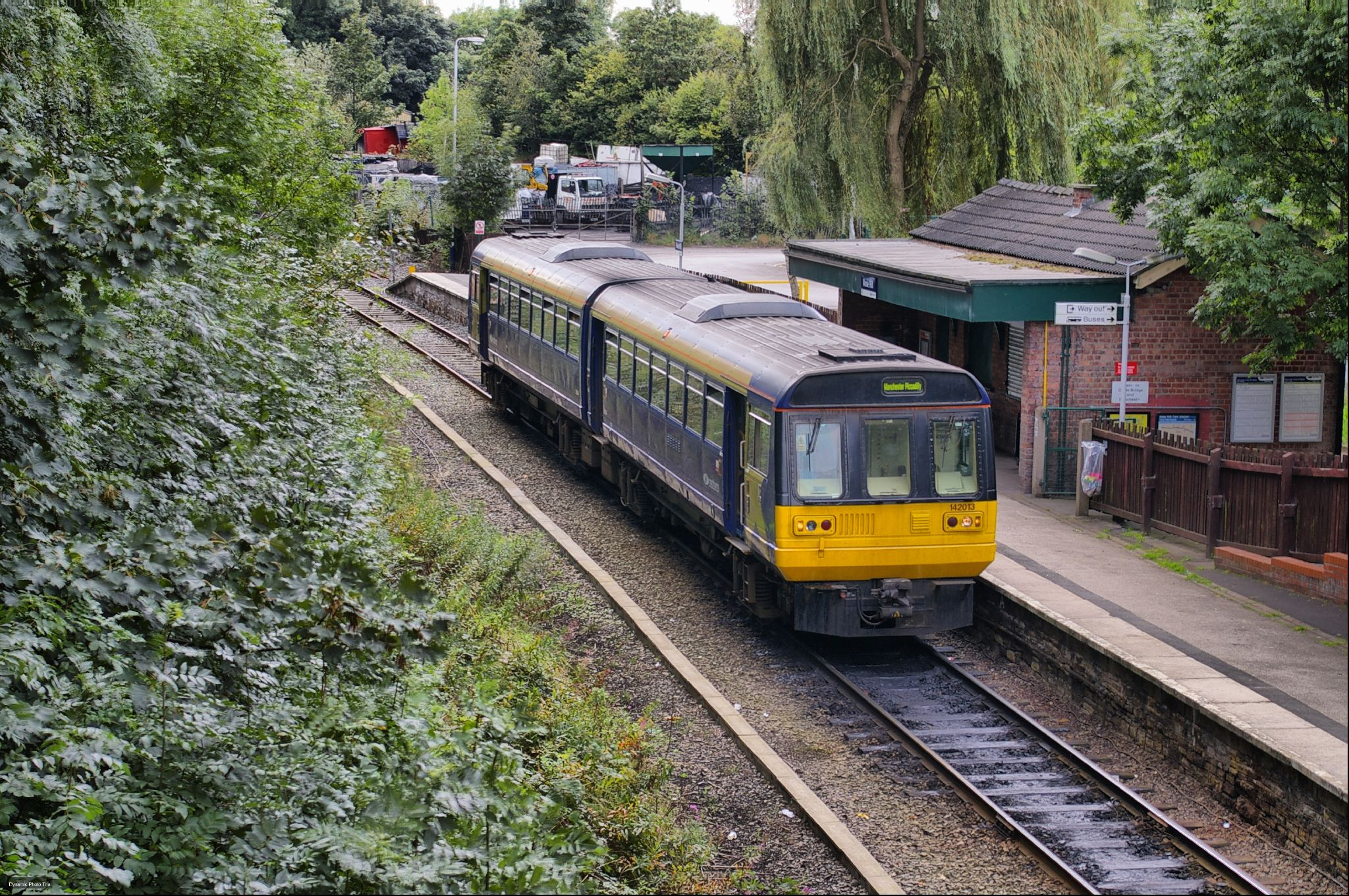
Rose Hill Marple station

The town has two railway stations on the Hope Valley Line, with services operated by Northern Trains:

- Marple hosts regular services between Manchester Piccadilly, New Mills Central and Sheffield.
- Rose Hill Marple was originally on the Macclesfield, Bollington and Marple Railway, which was closed in 1970. It is now at the end of a spur providing services to Manchester Piccadilly, via the Hyde loop.

The Agatha Christie character Miss Marple is often thought to be named after the railway station, which Christie often travelled through on her way to visit her sister, though Christie later wrote that the name was inspired by a visit to Marple Hall (see the Marple Hall section above).

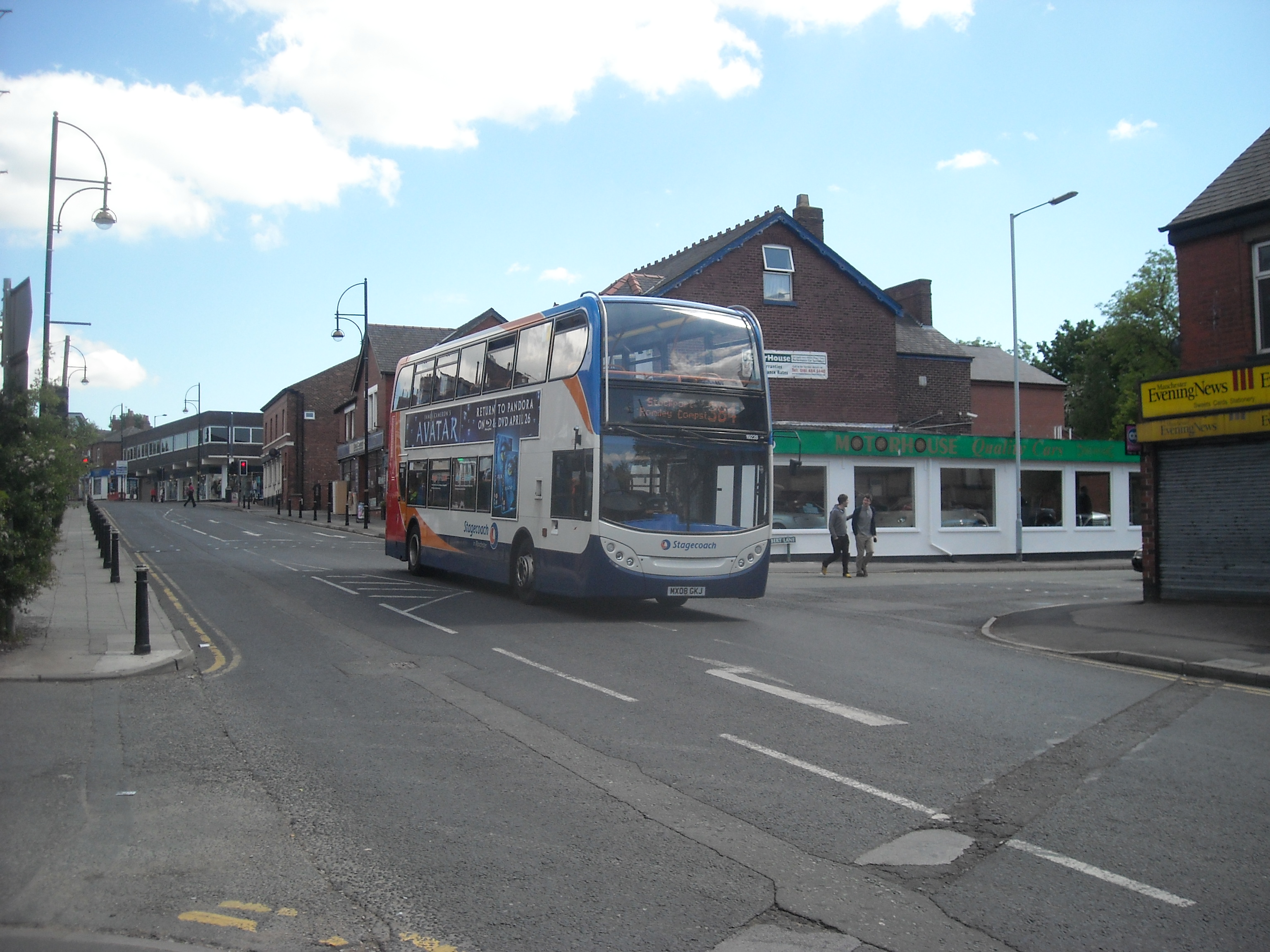
Stagecoach's 384 service towards Stockport

Bus services are operated primarily by Stagecoach Manchester and High Peak.

The town lies along the A626, which runs between Glossop and Heaton Chapel. It has a junction in the centre of Marple with the B6101, which heads south to New Mills.

== Education ==
Education in Marple is run by Stockport Metropolitan Borough Council.

There are two primary schools (Rose Hill Primary and All Saints' Primary) plus the secondary Marple Hall School, which occupies the site of the ancestral home of the Bradshaw-Isherwood family. Marple Sixth Form College (formerly Ridge Danyers College) offers courses to young people and adults. There is also an independent school and nursery, Brabyns Preparatory School.

== Sport ==
Marple Rugby Club has three adult teams, and a "Marple Minis Rugby" outfit with teams from age 7 to 17.

Marple Cricket Club was formed in c.1900 and has been based at Bowden Lane since 1951. The club is a member of the ECB Cheshire County Cricket League. The club runs six senior teams: the first, second, third and fourth teams play on Saturdays and the fifth and sixth teams on Sundays. The club also has a large junior section. The cricket club built a squash section in the 1970s, which has three courts and four teams playing regular club squash.

Brabyns Tennis Club has four clay courts and three floodlit artificial grass courts, enabling year-round play. The club has several men's and ladies' teams in the Slazenger North East Cheshire League and mixed teams in the East Cheshire Winter League. There is a junior section and extensive coaching programme.

Marple Golf Club, founded in 1892, is in Hawk Green, Marple. It is an 18-hole private members' course.

== Notable people ==
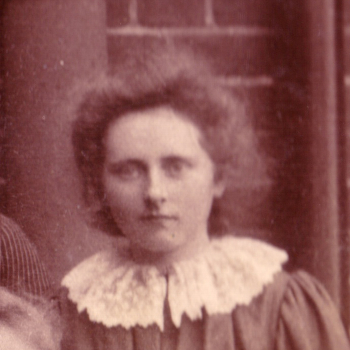
Mabel Hardie 1888/89

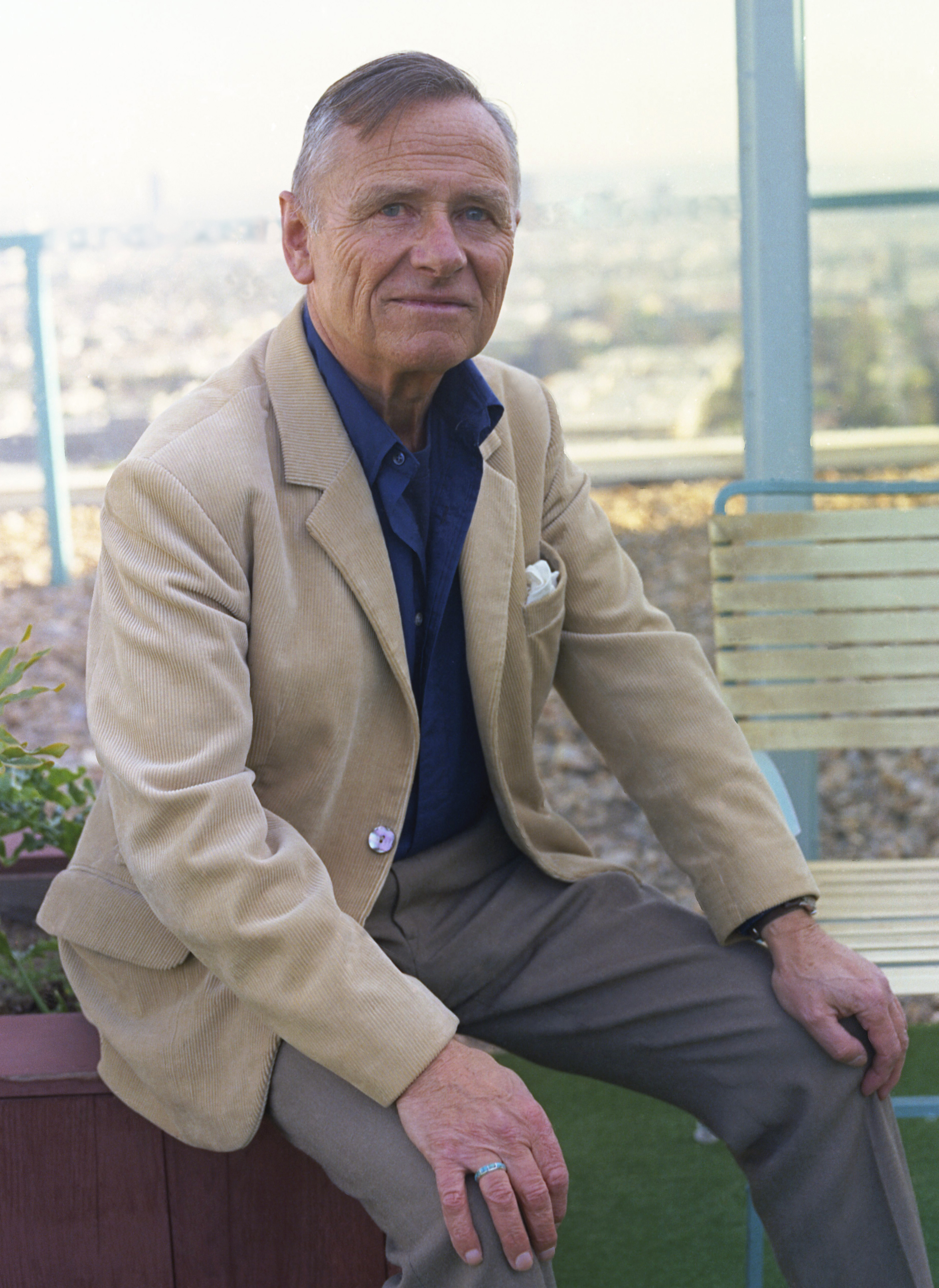
Christopher Isherwood, 1973

- John Bradshaw (1602–1659), president of the court that tried King Charles I
- Samuel Oldknow (1756–1830) cotton manufacturer who became Britain's leading manufacturer of muslin, moved to Marple after serving an apprenticeship in Nottingham. His lime kilns can still be seen in Marple.
- Edward Parrott (1863–1921), teacher, author and politician; MP for Edinburgh South
- Mabel Hardie (1866–1916), physician and surgeon at the Scottish Women's Hospitals for Foreign Service
- Lt.Colonel John Stanhope Collings-Wells (1880–1918), recipient of the Victoria Cross lived in Marple
- William Washington (1885–1956), engraver, painter & Principal of the Hammersmith School of Art for 20 years.
- Oswald Carver (1887–1915), a British rower and team bronze medallist at the 1908 Summer Olympics.
- Christopher Isherwood (1904–1986), novelist, had his family home at Marple Hall, though he was born at nearby Wyberslegh Hall
- Joyce Porter (1924–1990), crime fiction author born in Marple.
- Edmund Cooper (1926–1982), a poet and prolific writer of science fiction and detective novels
- Jonathan Gledhill (1949–2021), became Bishop of Lichfield, curate at All Saints Church, Marple, 1975–1978.
- Tony Wilson (1950–2007), journalist and record label owner, moved to Marple aged five.
- Stephen Bradbury (born 1954), artist and illustrator, grew up in Marple and attended Marple Hall School
- Timmy Mallett (born 1955), TV presenter, grew up in Marple and attended Rose Hill Primary School
- Matt Walker (born 1978), multiple medallist at the Paralympic Games, attended Marple Hall School
- Karl Davies (born 1982), actor who played Robert Sugden in the ITV soap opera Emmerdale.
- Christopher Finney (born 23 May 1984), soldier in the Blues and Royals, recipient of the George Cross

and

- Several bands, including Delphic (2007–2014), Dutch Uncles (from 2008) and Egyptian Hip Hop (2008–2014), grew up in and around Marple

== See also ==
- Listed buildings in Marple, Greater Manchester
- Marple Junction
