= Mellor Hall =

Country house in Greater Manchester, England

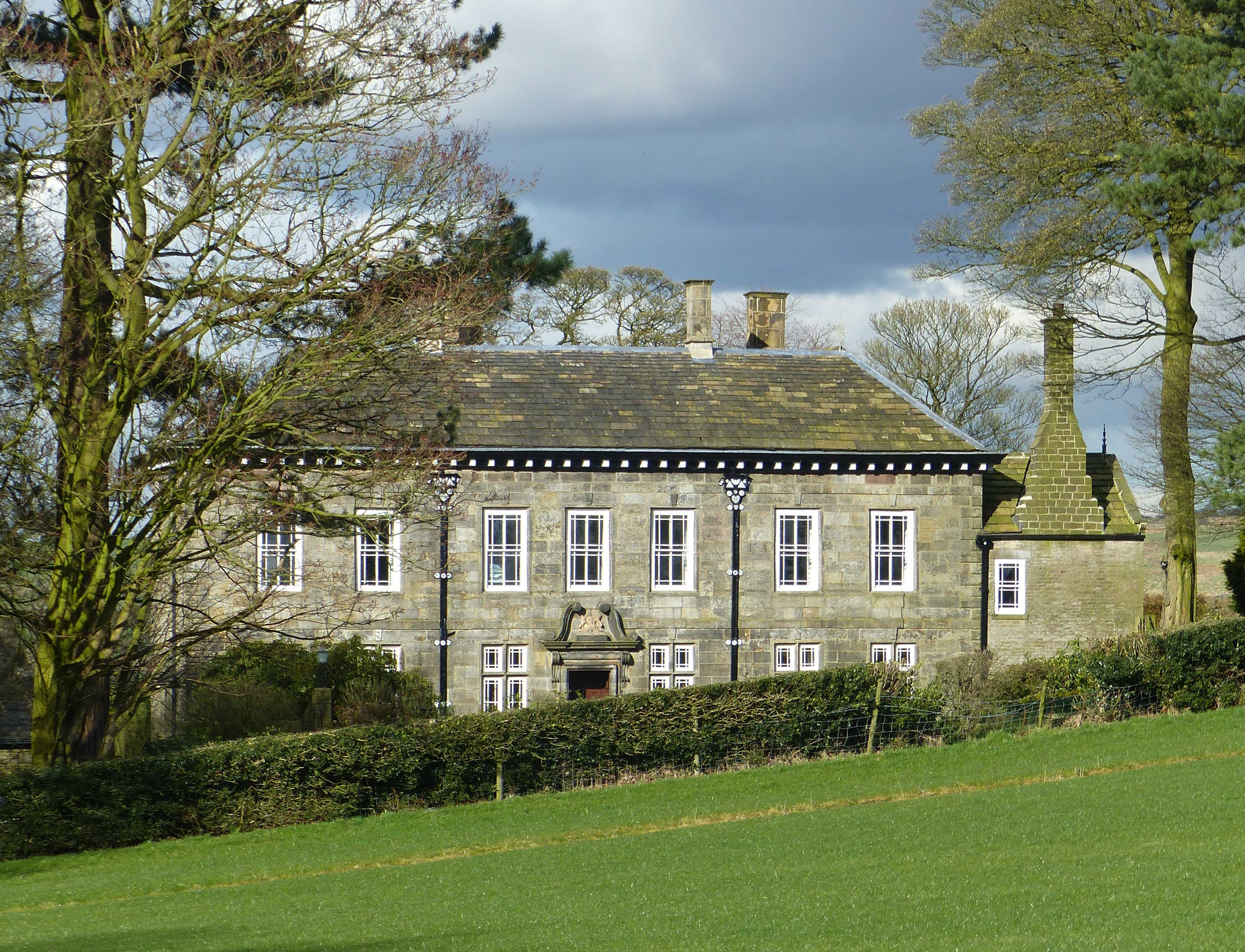
- The building in 2021

- Location within Greater Manchester

General information
- Location: Church Road, Mellor, Greater Manchester, England
- Coordinates: 53.3998°N 2.0218°W
- Completed: 1688

Design and construction
- Designations

Listed Building – Grade II*
- Official name: Mellor Hall and Mellor Hall Farmhouse
- Designated: 20 December 1967
- Reference no.: 1241992

Mellor Hall is a country house on Church Road in Mellor, a village within the Metropolitan Borough of Stockport, Greater Manchester, England, 0.4 miles (0.64 km) north of the Devonshire Arms off Longhurst Lane. The completion date of the present hall is thought to be 1688. The hall and the adjoining farmhouse, dated to 1691 and originally a smithy, has been designated by Historic England as a Grade II* listed building.

== History ==
Mellor Hall was historically the seat of the Mellor family from the 15th century, and afterwards belonged to the Radcliffes. In 1686 James Chetham purchased the Mellor and Botham Hall estates in Mellor from Susanna Radcliffe, daughter of William Radcliffe. It is believed that he ordered a rebuilding of the previous manor house; the year 1688 has been mentioned as the year of completion of the hall and 1691 as the year of completion of the farmhouse, which appears to have been used originally as a smithy. His great-grandson, Thomas Chetham of Highgate, Middlesex, sold the Botham Hall estate in 1787 to local cotton magnate Samuel Oldknow, and the Mellor Hall estate to Ralph Bridge in about 1797. Bridge's son was using the hall as a farmhouse as of 1819.

On 20 December 1967, the house was Grade II* listed. In 1978 Stockport Metropolitan Borough Council established the Mellor/Moorend conservation area on the border of Stockport and Derbyshire, which incorporates the hamlet of Moorend and outlying farms Longshaw Clough and Podnor, settlements at the end of Longhurst Lane, including Brook Bottom and Lower Hall and St Thomas' Church and Mellor Hall. The conservation area was extended in 2007.

== Architecture ==
The main hall was completed in 1688 according to Nicholas Pevsner, and the adjoining farmhouse is dated "IC 1691". It is built of grey ashlar, with a graduated stone slate roof. The hall is a 2-storey building, with seven bays on each floor, and a central door displaying a coat of arms and a steep broken swan-neck pediment. Six of the ground floor windows are fitted with light ogee mullion and transom windows, with marginal glazing bars and keystones, and all of the seven first floor windows are sash windows with marginal glazing bars, cyma-moulded surrounds and keystones. On the rear is a wing, with a hipped roof and quoins, mullion and transom windows; the two storey farmhouse extends from this wing, with three bays on each floor, and a central chimney stack. The interior is described as having a "massive hearth with segmental keystone arch."

== Associated buildings ==
Three nearby buildings associated with the hall are listed at Grade II: an outbuilding that once included labourers' accommodation, a former barn and shippon, and a sundial.

Other listed buildings at Mellor Hall
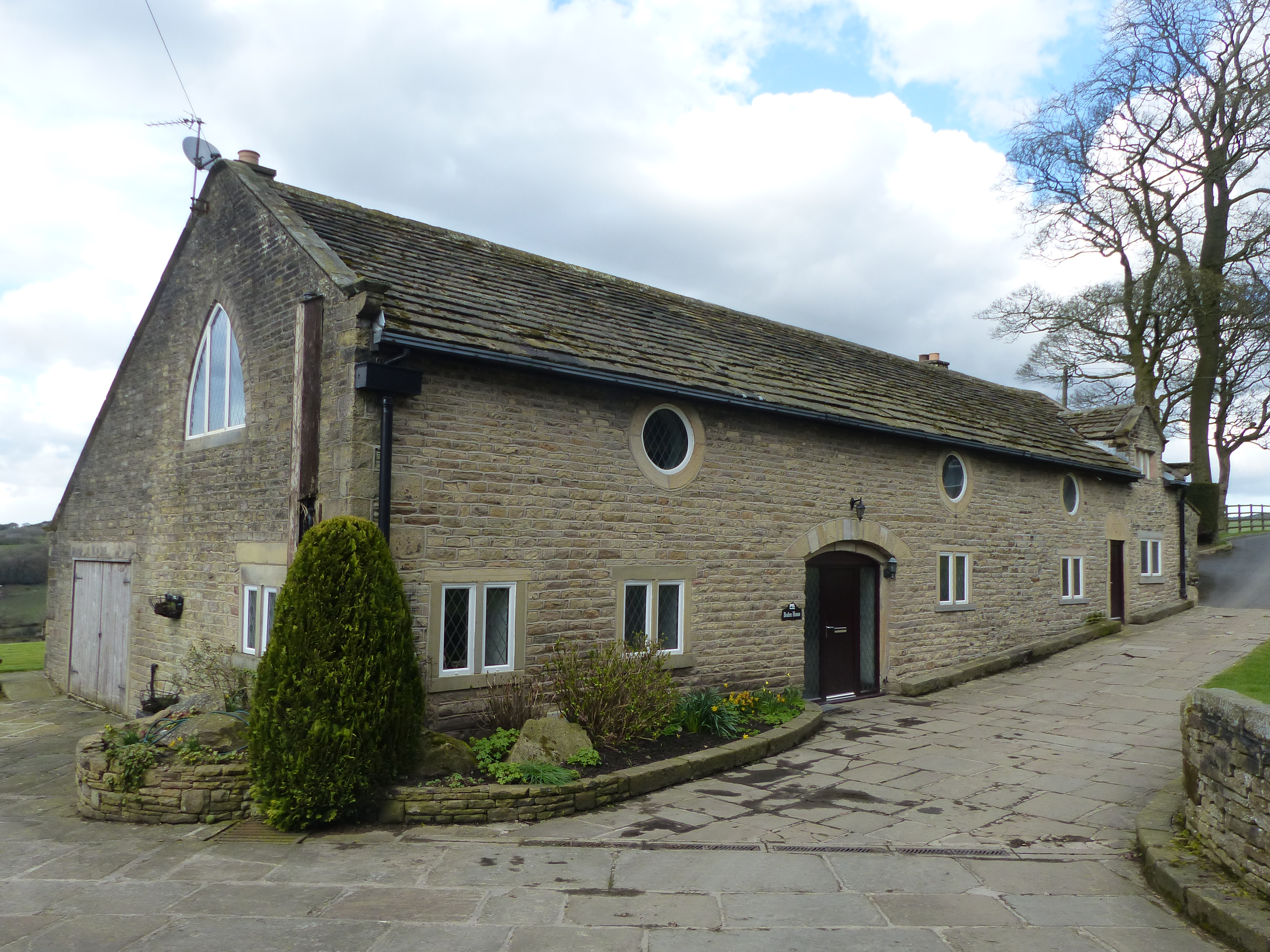
Farm building with labourers' accommodation

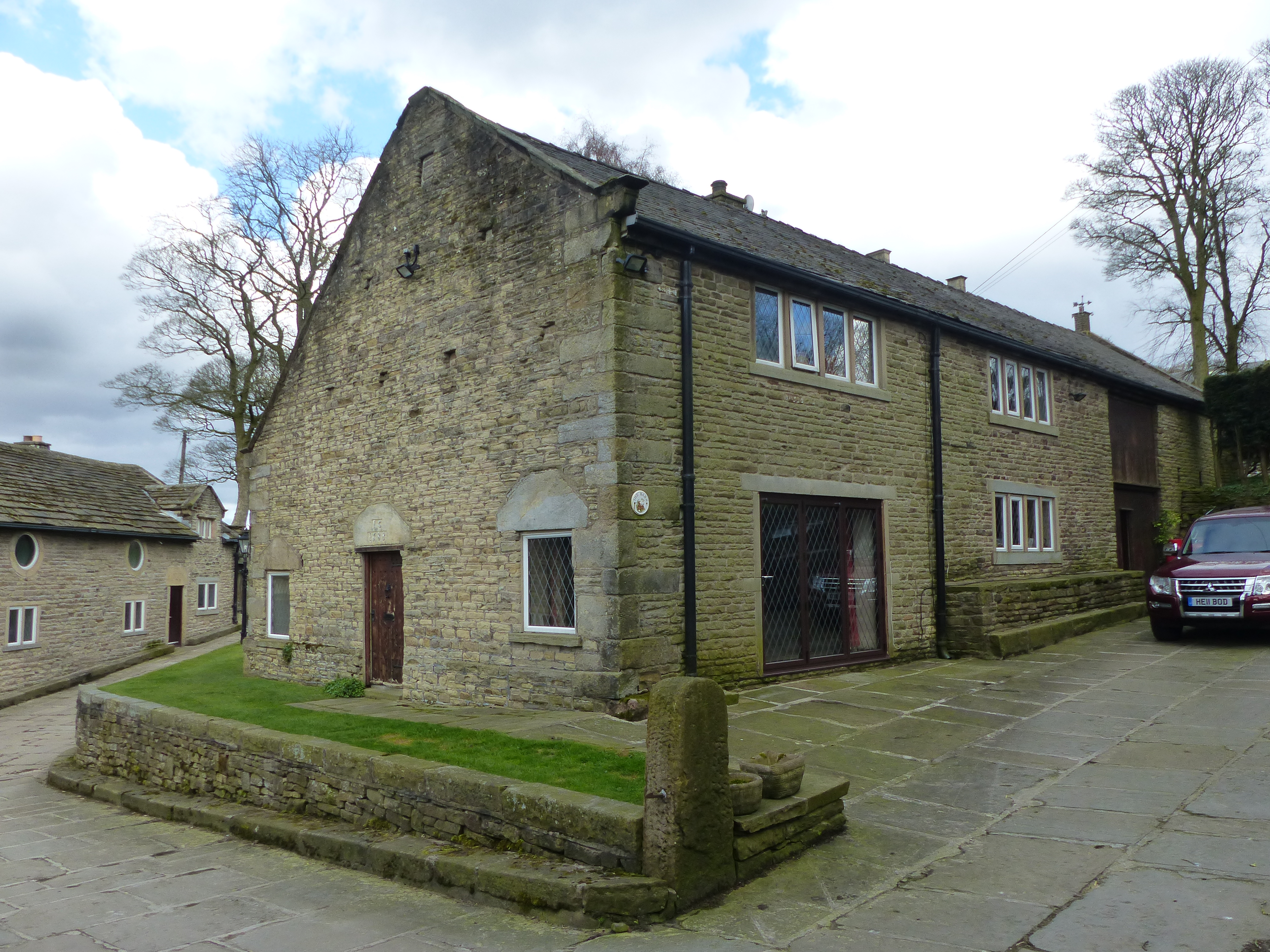
Former barn and shippon

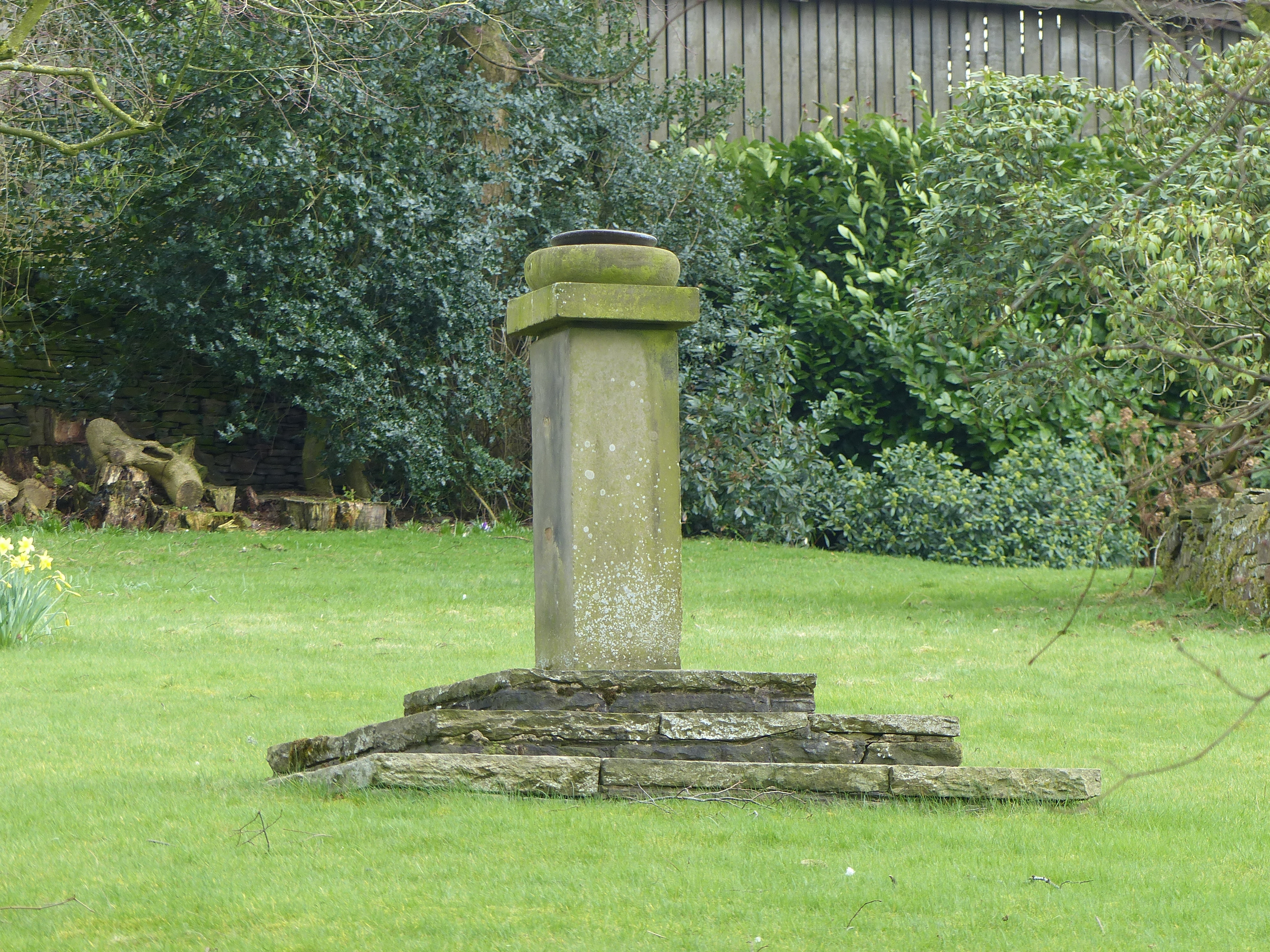
Sundial

== See also ==
- Grade II* listed buildings in Greater Manchester
- Listed buildings in Marple, Greater Manchester
