= Thomas Brierley grave cipher =

Grave in Greater Manchester, England

Coordinates: 53°23′49.1″N 2°01′43.8″W

Thomas Brierley's memorial, Mellor (Photo: Mark Brierley)

The gravestone of Thomas Brierley (1785 – 1854 or 1855) in Mellor, Greater Manchester, is one of the few in the United Kingdom known to incorporate masonic pigpen cypher in its inscription.

== Brierley's life and freemasonry ==
Thomas Brierley was born on 16 July 1785 at Mellor to Joab Brierley and Betty Arnfield. He was also known as "Tommy" and some references call him "Didymus" – perhaps confusing him for an uncle of that name or as a common alternative to Thomas. He became a blockprinter at the Printworks mill in Strines, Manchester, where calico was printed. Later as a carter he plied his trade between Ludworth and Disley.

Brierley was a regular attendee at the Freemason Lodge of Union (originally a Lancashire Lodge of Union No.50), according to the records that exist between 1824 and 1830 and from 1840 to 1848. The Lodge migrated from Manchester to Mellor in 1822. It met at the Devonshire Arms and several other hostelries in the locality before it shifted to the Shuttle Inn (renamed the George) at Ludworth. Returns to the Clerk of the Peace between 1834 and 1841 show that the Lodge averaged about 20 members each meeting; chiefly miners and minor tradesmen. Brierley was also Treasurer of the Royal Arch chapter (founded 1824). He was also a member of the Moon Lodge of Benevolence, as well as other degrees including Mark and Rose Croix.

== Burial ==
Thomas seemed to have some periods of illness and had recourse to the sick funds of the society. A number of members complained and made unpleasant personal remarks, as apparently his illness coincided with a slack time at Strines Printworks. It is said that he was "an honourable man and this charge grieved him sore." (Other sources refer to him as one who was prone to display his membership of the masonic fraternity and to make it known that his worth was not sufficiently recognised.)

Either way, he had a stone coffin made by Azariah Ollerenshaw, a stonemason of local repute, for which he lay down so that the coffin could be accurately cut for his body and head for a perfect fit. (Another source claims that the Duke of Devonshire, hearing that Thomas was ill, had the coffin made for him.)

The coffin was then placed, exposed, on a previously purchased grave site at St Thomas' Church, Mellor. The lid was carved with some Masonic symbols and underneath the words "I am belied", referring to the accusations of feigned illness. It lay there for some years and became quite a tourist attraction. However, it eventually created too much unwanted attention for the vicar, Rev. Matthew Freeman, who ordered it to be buried in the grave (and it apparently still lies there just below the surface).

Not to be frustrated, Thomas had a memorial headstone prepared covered with 'cipher-writings' and ornate masonic emblems which was placed over his grave before he died. Subsequently, there was talk of burying him in his stone coffin but it was found to be too heavy to remove to the house and it was not done to take the body to the coffin in the grave. He was buried in a wooden coffin presumably beside the stone coffin.

== Inscriptions ==
The cipher on the headstone was presented as a mystery in books and newspaper articles right into the latter part of the 20th century. The headstone is actually written in five pig-pen variations. The text at the head of the stone says "Thomas Brierley made his ingress July 16th 1785, His Progress was ____ Years And his Egress___". The headstone was never completed after his death (possibly because no one was interested and his father survived him only one more year and was of advanced age).

The cipher at the foot of the gravestone says "Holiness of the Lord". The pigpen cipher was used by Freemasons in the 18th century to keep their records private, and surprisingly the cipher on Thomas Brierley's grave seems to have a non-standard symbol for the letter "S". It is possible that the variation in the cipher is a clue to or a key to documents that he dealt with as the treasurer. However, at the time of its placement in the graveyard the common impression was that it contained the old charge against his fellows and it was stated to be purposefully written in Hebrew to defy objections to it being placed over the grave during Thomas' lifetime. Indeed, newspaper reports echoed this and one gentleman visiting the grave solemnly asserted it was Greek but when cornered in the subject admitted it was a kind of Greek with which a university education had not acquainted him.

According to some, Thomas Brierley fell to his death from the church tower, but other sources disagree so this story may be an urban legend. To add to the mystery, a bronze plaque was added to the stone in recent times with more cipher upon it, the cipher used being similar but not identical.

He died in 1855 and was buried in Mellor Churchyard on 26 July of that year, though some accounts record his death as occurring in 1854.
