= Listed buildings in Marple, Greater Manchester =

Marple is a town in the Metropolitan Borough of Stockport, Greater Manchester, England. The town, together with the villages of High Lane, Marple Bridge, Mellor, and Strines, and the surrounding countryside, contains 141 listed buildings that are recorded in the National Heritage List for England. Of these, one is listed at Grade I, the highest of the three grades, three are at Grade II*, the middle grade, and the others are at Grade II, the lowest grade.

The area was mainly rural until the Industrial Revolution brought the textile industry to the region towards the end of the 18th century. The listed buildings dating from before that time are mainly houses and associated structures, farmhouses and farm buildings, together with a church and a bridge. The Peak Forest Canal and the Macclesfield Canal were built through the area, making a junction in Marple. A considerable number of structures associated with the canals are listed, including bridges, a flight of 16 locks, aqueducts, lock keepers' cottages, warehouses, and milestones. The Manchester, Sheffield and Lincolnshire Railway was also built to run through the area, and two of its viaducts are listed. The other listed buildings include a weir on the River Goyt, bridges, the remains of a limekiln, churches and items in churchyards, former toll houses, and war memorials.

== Key ==
Grade	Criteria
I	Buildings of exceptional interest, sometimes considered to be internationally important
II*	Particularly important buildings of more than special interest
II	Buildings of national importance and special interest

== Buildings ==
Name and location	Photograph	Date	Notes	Grade
Remains of Saxon Cross; 53.39698°N 2.02801°W		Anglo-Saxon (probable)	The cross remains are in stone, and consist of a cubic head carved with a castellated motif in relief bands, on a square shaft with chamfered corners. On the upper face is a later dial.	II
Old Manor Farm; 53.39492°N 2.09208°W	—	15th century	A manor house that originated as a cruck-framed open hall, a timber framed cross-wing was added in the 16th century, followed by a stone service cross-wing, and a rear brick wing in the 20th century. The timber framed parts are on stone plinths, the cross-wing is gabled, some windows are mullioned and others are casements, and at the rear is a dormer window with a jettied gable.	II*
St Thomas' Church, Mellor; 53.39698°N 2.02883°W		15th century	The oldest part of the church is the tower, the rest dating from the 19th century. It is in stone, and consists of a nave, a south porch dated 1815, a chancel, and a west tower. The tower has three stages, diagonal buttresses, quoins, a mullioned and transomed west window, clock faces, and an embattled parapet with enriched finials. The porch has a segmental-headed doorway, a round-headed window, and a coped gable.	II
Spout House; 53.37961°N 2.04955°W		16th century	A cruck framed house largely rebuilt in stone and brick and with a tile roof. It has one storey with an attic and three bays, with a stone plinth in the third bay. On the front is a 20th-century gabled porch, and there is a gabled dormer in the first bay.	II
Ridge End; 53.37577°N 2.05397°W		Early to mid-17th century	A farmhouse, later a house, in stone on a projecting plinth, that has a stone-slate roof with coped gables and ball finials. It was originally an H-shaped house, with a main range and cross-wings, and in the 20th century a rear wing and a right extension were added. There are two storeys with attics, and most windows are mullioned.	II
Marsden House; 53.36451°N 2.08241°W		Mid-17th century	The oldest part of the farmhouse is the wing, most of it dating from the 19th century. The wing is in sandstone with a clay tile roof, and the main part is in brick with a stone-slate roof. There are two storeys, the main part has three bays, the wing is to the rear-left, and there is an outshut in the angle. There is also a two-storey, one-bay 17th-century cottage and a 19th-century outhouse. On the front is a verandah, a door with a fanlight and a pediment, and canted bay windows. The windows are sashes and at the rear is a tall stair window. In the outhouse are horizontally-sliding sash windows, and in the wing are mullioned windows.	II
Sundial, Marple Hall; 53.39554°N 2.06140°W		Mid-17th century	The sundial was moved to the Memorial Park from Marple Hall when it was demolished. It is in stone and has a three-step plinth, a column with entasis, and a capital that forms the base for a copper dial with Roman numerals.	II
Tanpit Cottage; 53.39761°N 2.05077°W	—	Mid-17th century	A sandstone farmhouse with a 20th-century extension in concrete blocks, and a 20th-century tiled roof. It has two storeys, two bays, a rear extension, and an outshut to the right. On the front is a porch with a moulded surround, a shaped lintel, a coped gable, and small obelisks. The outshut has quoins, mullioned windows, one with a hood mould, and finials. The other windows are casements.	II
30 and 32 Mill Brow; 53.40354°N 2.03064°W		17th century	Originally one house, later divided into two, it is in stone on a projecting plinth, with quoins and moulded eaves brackets. The roof is partly of slate and partly of stone-slate and has coped gables and scroll finials. The house has two storeys, a single-depth plan, four bays, and a flat-roofed extension to the rear. There is a two-storey porch with a coped gable and finial containing a door with a plain surround, and two 20th-century bay windows. The other windows are casements.	II
Barn, 261 Windlehurst Old Road; 53.37821°N 2.06729°W		17th century	The barn is timber framed, it was clad in stone in the 18th century, and it has a stone slab roof. There are two large wagon entrances, doorways and mullioned windows. Inside is a full cruck, and some timber framing. (Note: Street View in June 2016 shows that the barn has been converted for residential use.)	II
Barn, Pear Tree Farm; 53.40363°N 2.03336°W		17th century or earlier	The barn, partly converted for other uses, is cruck-framed with stone walls, a stone-slate roof, and five bays. The first two bays have three cruck trusses; bays 3 to 5 are higher, and have four cruck trusses. Most of the openings are from the 20th century, except for a loft hatch and a door into an aisle.	II
Block of cottages, Strines; 53.37467°N 2.03588°W		17th century	Originally a house, later divided into separate dwellings. It is in stone with brick repairs, some brick extensions, and a stone-slate roof. It consists of a central range with two storeys and cross-wings with three storeys and attics, one with coped gables. There are two doorways with rusticated surrounds, one flat-headed, the other with a round-arched head. The windows are sashes, some with moulded surrounds.	II
High Cliff Cottage; 53.37625°N 2.02561°W		17th century	The oldest part of the farmhouse is the rear wing, the main range dating from the 19th century. The house is in stone with a stone-slate roof, and has two storeys, three bays, and a large rear wing. In the main range is a central doorway with a fanlight and sash windows. The rear wing has mullioned windows, and a blocked doorway in the gable.	II
Lomber Hey House; 53.37092°N 2.06692°W	—	17th century	A stone house, partly rendered, with a slate roof and ball finials. The main range has three storeys, three bays, a projecting plinth, continuous hood moulds, a porch and casement windows on the front. The right gable is coped and contains a mullioned window and a carved head. There are two gabled two-storey wings, the left one projecting further; this has casement windows, and the other wing has mullioned windows on the ground floor and casement windows above. At the rear is a lower range with a separate roof.	II
Lumm House; 53.38196°N 2.05099°W		17th century	A farmhouse, later a private house, it is in stone on a projecting plinth, and has a stone-slate roof. There are two storeys, and L-shaped plan, consisting of the original range and a 20th-century rear wing. In the original part are three mullioned windows, there is a gabled dormer window, and the other windows date from the 20th century.	II
Outbuilding, Ridge End; 53.37560°N 2.05381°W		17th century	The outbuilding is in stone, and has a stone-slate roof with coped gables on three sides and a ball finial. It has one bay and two storeys. External steps lead up to a first floor doorway, and on the other sides are doors and blocked openings.	II
Ridge End Cottage and farm building 53.37554°N 2.05417°W		17th century (probable)	The farm building is the older, the cottage is dated 1778, and they form an L-shaped plan. They are in stone with roofs of stone-slate and 20th-century tiles. The older part is on a projecting plinth and its roof has coped gables. It contains one mullioned window, replaced casement windows, and loft hatches. The later part has two bays, and contains a cart entry.	II
Spout House Farm; 53.37965°N 2.04971°W		17th century	A farmhouse, later a private house, in stone with a stone-slate roof. There are two storeys, two bays, and a 20th-century rear extension. The doorway has a moulded surround and a shaped lintel, and the windows are 20th-century casements.	II
Sundial, Ridge End; 53.37571°N 2.05393°W	—	17th century	The sundial in the garden of the house is in stone. It consists of a square base, a cluster of four columns, and a shaped top, on which are a copper dial with Roman numerals and a gnomon.	II
Wybersley Hall; 53.36545°N 2.05811°W		17th century	A timber framed farmhouse later encased in stone, altered to improve its appearance and extended in about 1807. It has a slate roof, two storeys, a central range of two bays, and gabled cross-wings. The central doorway has a moulded surround. The windows in the central range are casements, and in the wings they are sashes. The parapets are embattled and the gables are crow-stepped.	II
Barnsfold Manor Farm; 53.38212°N 2.06713°W		1659	The farmhouse, later a private house, was extended in 1739. It is in stone on a projecting plinth and has a stone-slate roof. There is an L-shaped plan, two storeys with an attic, and the original part has two bays with a porch to the right. The second bay projects and has a coped gable with ball finials. The windows are mullioned with hood moulds, and in the later wing they are casements. Inside there are timber framed partitions.	II
2 Shepley Lane; 53.38395°N 2.06354°W	—	1660	A stone house that has a stone-slate roof with coped gables and ornate finials. There are two storeys, two bays, lean-to extensions at the right and the rear, and a gabled porch. The windows are casements, those on the upper floor in gabled dormers. Inside the house are timber framed partitions.	II
Barn, Beeston Hall; 53.37584°N 2.05626°W	—	Mid to late 17th century	The barn is in stone and has a stone-slate roof with a coped gable and a ball finial, and an owl hole in the gable. There are shippons with haylofts above, doorways and windows.	II
Pear Tree Farmhouse; 53.40361°N 2.03286°W		1672	The oldest part of the farmhouse is the rear wing, the main part being dated 1705. The farmhouse is in stone with a stone-slate roof. It has two storeys, a three-bay main range with two gables, a porch in the left gable, a rear wing, and a 20th-century two-bay extension to the right. The central doorway has a chamfered surround and a dated lintel, The rear wing has quoins and coped gables and a dormer gable with a datestone. The windows are mullioned.	II
Mellor Hall and Mellor Hall Farmhouse; 53.40044°N 2.02295°W		Late 17th century	A country house and adjoining smithy, later a farmhouse, they are in stone, the house with a stone-slate roof, and the farmhouse with a slate roof. The house has a plinth, bands, rusticated quoins, a modillion eaves cornice, and a hipped roof. There are two storeys, seven bays, and two rear wings. The central doorway has a steep broken swan-neck pediment containing a coat of arms. The ground floor windows are mullioned and transomed, and on the upper floor they are sashes with moulded surrounds and keystones. The farmhouse has two storeys and three bays.	II*
Townscliffe Cottage and Farmhouse; 53.39683°N 2.03843°W		Late 17th century	A farmhouse, later a private house, to which a wing was added in the 19th century. It is in stone with a stone-slate roof, and has two storeys. The original part consists of a main range and cross-wings with quoins. The original door, now blocked, has a chamfered surround, and the later inserted door has a moulded surround. The windows in the original part are casements, and in the later wing they are sashes with wedge lintels.	II
Wood Farmhouse; 53.39008°N 2.08490°W	—	1682	A stone farmhouse on a projecting plinth with a stone-slate roof. There are two storeys and three bays. The first bay is gabled, and the third bay projects as a cross-wing. In the middle bay is a porch with quoins, a doorway with a chamfered surround, and an inscribed and dated lintel. The windows are mullioned, one in a gabled dormer.	II
81 and 83 Upper Hibbert Street; 53.38308°N 2.06236°W		1686	Originally one house, later divided into two, it is in stone with a stone-slate roof. There are two storeys, three bays, a rear wing, and a lean-to at the left. The doorways have moulded surrounds, one with an initialled and dated lintel, and the windows are mullioned with hood moulds.	II
Barn southwest of Mellor Hall; 53.40039°N 2.02335°W		1688	The barn and shippon are in stone with quoins and a stone-slate roof with coped gables. The shippon has a loft above, and in the barn are opposing cart entries and vents. There are three doorways, two blocked, with shaped lintels, one of which is dated.	II
Outbuilding west of Mellor Hall; 53.40059°N 2.02347°W		1692	The outbuilding is in stone with quoins, and has a roof partly in stone-slate and partly in 20th-century tiles with coped gables. It has two storeys, eight bays, and a rear outshut. The building contains a segmental cart entry, mullioned windows, a doorway with a dated lintel, two pitching holes, a gabled dormer, and three openings in the left gable.	II
Peers Cottages; 53.37215°N 2.04564°W		1694	A stone house with quoins and a stone-slate roof with a coped gable. It has a single-depth plan, two storeys and five bays. The doorway has a moulded lintel and an inscribed stone, and the windows are mullioned. Inside there are timber framed partitions.	II
Sundial, Mellor Hall; 53.40011°N 2.02329°W		1695	The sundial is in the grounds of Mellor Hall. It is in stone, and consists of a plain square shaft with a square head, on which is an inscribed copper dial and a gnomon in a bowl-shaped base.	II
Lower Dale Farmhouse; 53.40806°N 2.08238°W	—	1719	The farmhouse is in stone, rendered on three sides, with a 20th-century tile roof. It has a double-depth plan, two storeys, and a symmetrical three-bay front. On the front is a semicircular recessed porch with a keystone, and the windows are three-light casements. Inside are timber framed partitions with wattle and daub infill.	II
The Cottage; 53.41653°N 2.02930°W	—	1719	A stone house with quoins and a stone-slate roof, it has two storeys and three bays. The first bay projects and contains casement windows, and in the other bays the windows are mullioned. The doorway in the third bay has a chamfered surround and a dated lintel.	II
34 Hollins Lane; 53.40109°N 2.04812°W	—	Early 18th century	A stone house with a stone-slate roof, it has three storeys, two bays, and a single-storey carriage house and stable to the left, now incorporated into the house. On the front is a porch with a hipped tiled roof. The windows are mullioned, and some also have transoms.	II
160 Strines Road; 53.37974°N 2.04968°W		Early 18th century	A stone house with quoins and a slate roof. It has two storeys, two bays and a rear lean-to. On the front is a central gabled porch, there is a gabled dormer, and the other windows are casements.	II
Manor House, Barnsfold Road; 53.38148°N 2.06664°W		Early 18th century	A stone house with quoins and a stone-slate roof with coped gables. There is a double-depth plan, two storeys, three bays and a single-storey extension to the right. The central doorway has a segmental arch, a keystone and a fanlight, and the windows are casements.	II
Manor House, Station Road; 53.39697°N 2.06429°W		1731	A roughcast house on a stone plinth. with an eaves cornice and a stone-slate roof. It has three storeys, a double-depth plan, three bays, and a later bay added to the right. The porch is recessed and has a segmental head, and to its right is a bay window. The other windows are sashes, those on the top floor being horizontally-sliding.	II
137 Moor End Road; 53.39197°N 2.00776°W	—	Mid-18th century	A farmhouse, later a private house, in stone with a stone-slate roof. It has two storeys, a three-bay range, a parallel two-bay range at the rear, and a 20th-century garage wing to the left. On the front is a gabled porch, and the windows are mullioned and contain casements.	II
Lower Danbank Farmhouse; 53.39622°N 2.09306°W	—	Mid-18th century	A brick farmhouse, rendered at the rear, on a projecting sandstone plinth, with bands and a stone-slate roof with crow-stepped gables and stone coping. There are three storeys and three bays. In the centre is a recessed porch with a semicircular head. The windows on the lower two floors are 20th-century casements with wedge lintels, and on the top floor there are horizontally-sliding sash windows. At the rear is a 20th-century conservatory.	II
Middle Dale Farmhouse; 53.40775°N 2.07846°W		Mid-18th century	The farmhouse is in stone with a stone-slate roof. It has two storeys, a double-depth plan, three bays, and a later large four-bay wing. In the original part is a central doorway with a square-cut surround and a small fanlight. The windows are sashes.	II
Outbuildings, Lower Danbank Farm; 53.39633°N 2.09245°W	—	Mid-18th century	The outbuildings are in brick on a projecting sandstone plinth, with roofs of corrugated asbestos and slate and crow-stepped gables. They have an L-shaped plan. The west range is a barn containing opposing cart entries with semi-elliptical heads flanked by square piers, and two rows of vents. The north range contains a shippon, stables and haylofts, and has five doors, a left lean-to and a stone wing.	II
Primrose Cottage; 53.38965°N 2.03000°W		Mid-18th century	A stone house with quoins and a stone-slate roof. There are two storeys, two bays, an outshut and lean-to at the rear left, and a wing to the rear right. In the centre is a gabled porch, and the doorway has a chamfered surround and a shaped lintel. The windows are mullioned.	II
Outbuilding, Wybersley Hall; 53.36585°N 2.05827°W		18th century	A carriage house and stable that were extended in the 19th century. They are in stone with quoins and have a slate roof with crow-stepped gables. There are two storeys and three bays. The building has a carriage entrance with a semi-elliptical arch and a keystone, doorways with semicircular heads, keystones and fanlights, mullioned windows, and pitching holes.	II
Roman Bridge; 53.38298°N 2.05154°W		18th century	A footbridge over the River Goyt, it is in stone. The bridge consists of a single segmental arch, the depth of the deck being only that of the voussoirs. It has later iron railings.	II
Strawberry Hill; 53.38277°N 2.04984°W		18th century	A stone house, mainly rendered with stone-slate roofs. It has two storeys, four bays, an older gabled wing projecting on the left, and a rear wing. The first three bays are in Regency style, on a projecting plinth, with a sill band, an eaves band, and a parapet. The doorway has a semi-elliptical fanlight, a keystone, and a flat canopy on columns, and the windows are sashes. The fourth bay is lower, and contains a sash window and a mullioned window. At the rear are more mullioned windows, an arched staircase window, and two doors, one with an ornate radial fanlight.	II
Cobden Farmhouse; 53.38676°N 2.02213°W		1762	A stone farmhouse with rusticated quoins and a 20th-century tiled roof. There are two storeys and three bays. In the centre is a doorway with a rusticated semicircular head and a tripartite keystone. The windows on the front are 20th-century casements with rusticated surrounds and keystone lintels. At the rear is a 20th-century porch, a doorway with a chamfered surround, and mullioned windows.	II
225 Longhurst Lane; 53.39283°N 2.03654°W		Mid to late 18th century	A stone house with a stone-slate roof, two storeys, two bays, a single-bay former shippon to the right, now incorporated into the house, and a rear wing. On the front is a 20th-century porch, and the windows are mullioned.	II
The Old Court House; 53.36423°N 2.06914°W		1772	A stone house, partly rendered, with a roof of slate and stone-slate. There are two storeys, three bays, a lean-to on the left, and am right gabled wing. The windows are mullioned with hood moulds, and there is a wall-mounted sundial with an inscription.	II
Oldstones and 223 Longhurst Lane; 53.39289°N 2.03674°W		Late 18th century	A pair of stone cottages with a 20th-century tiled roof. They have two storeys, a double-depth plan, and each cottage has one bay. The doorways have square-cut surrounds, and the windows are mullioned.	II
Paradise; 53.38343°N 2.02380°W	—	Late 18th century	The house, extended in the 20th century, is in stone with a stone-slate roof. It has a double-depth plan, two storeys, two bays, and a flat-roofed 20th-century extension to the left. In the centre of the original part is a gabled porch, and the windows are mullioned.	II
Tollgate Cottage; 53.39759°N 2.05841°W		Late 18th century	A toll house, later a private house, adjacent to Lock No. 10 on the Peak Forest Canal, it is in stone on a projecting plinth, with quoins, and a stone-slate roof. There are two storeys, a single-depth plan, two bays, a 19th-century extension at the right, and 20th-century extensions at the rear. The left gable end is canted, there is one sash window, and the other are casements.	II
Bottoms Bridge; 53.39252°N 2.05287°W		c. 1790	The bridge carries Lakes Road over the River Goyt. It is in stone and consists of a single semicircular span with square projections and a parapet with a rounded top. The retaining walls curve outwards and end in square piers. It was commissioned by Samuel Oldknow to access his adjacent Mellor Mill, which was destroyed by fire in 1892.	II
Aqueduct south-west of Peers Cottages; 53.37161°N 2.04723°W		1794–1801	The aqueduct carries the Peak Forest Canal over a track. It is in stone, and consists of a segmental skew arch with voussoirs. There are concave retaining walls and a parapet on one side with rounded copings, and at the ends are square piers.	II
Bridge No. 16, Peak Forest Canal; 53.40719°N 2.06561°W		1794–1801	A roving bridge over the canal, it is in stone, and consists of a semicircular arch with a band and rounded copings. The retaining and parapet walls have a curved plan, and end in a square pier at one end, and at the other sweep down to the towpath.	II
Bridge No. 21, Peak Forest Canal (Routing Walls Bridge); 53.37955°N 2.05388°W		1794–1801	The bridge carries Hollinwood Lane over the canal. It is in sandstone, and consists of a horseshoe arch with a band and rounded copings. The retaining and parapet walls have a concave plan, and end in square piers.	II
Goyt Aqueduct; 53.40730°N 2.06887°W		1794–1801	The aqueduct carries the Peak Forest Canal over the River Goyt. It is in sandstone and consists of three semicircular arches nearly 30 metres (98 ft) tall. The piers have moulded bases and capitals. There is a band and a coped parapet ending in square piers, and in the spandrels are circular openings. On the towpath side is a higher parapet with round copings and passing places.	I
Bridge over mill stream 53.39257°N 2.05205°W		1790s	The bridge led to Mellor Lodge, now demolished, and (like nearby Bottoms Bridge, q.v.) was commissioned by Samuel Oldknow. It is in stone and consists of a single segmental arch with a keystone and flanked by square projections. On the centre of each parapet wall are gate posts.	II
Old Hall and Old Hall Farmhouse; 53.39074°N 2.04777°W		1790s	A stone house on a projecting plinth with bands and a hipped double-ridge roof of slate and stone-slate. There are three storeys, sides of three bays, and a two-storey three-bay canted rear wing. The central doorway has a flat canopy on columns and a fanlight, and the windows are sashes. In the extension are a porch and lunettes.	II
Outbuildings, Old Hall Farmhouse; 53.39055°N 2.04704°W		1790s	The outbuildings consist of farm buildings and a dormitory block for apprentices. They are in stone with roofs of stone-slate and corrugated iron. The buildings have two storeys, and form an S-shaped plan. The farm buildings include doors, semicircular openings, pitching holes and cart entries.	II
32 Strines Road; 53.39324°N 2.05656°W		1797	A farmhouse, later a private house, in stone with a band and a 20th-century tile roof, hipped at the right. It has a rectangular plan with a curved left end, two storeys with an attic, and four bays. On the ground floor are three large segmental arches. Steps lead up to the doorway on the upper floor, and there are three circular windows to the right. There is a semicircular attic window, and the other windows are mullioned, those on the upper floor with round heads.	II
Lime Kiln Farm; 53.39353°N 2.05701°W		1797	This originated as a warehouse and despatch building for lime, and was later converted into a house. It is in stone with a slate roof, and has one storey at the front and two at the rear with attics. There are fronts of five and two bays, a lean-to on the left, and an extension to the right. The doorways have rusticated surrounds, the windows have square-cut surrounds, and there are two dormer windows. At the rear are six semicircular arched cart entries that have been glazed.	II
Limekiln walling 53.39299°N 2.05778°W		1797	The walling at the front of the limekilns is in sandstone and consists of four concave bays. Two of the bays have semicircular-headed openings and one has a semi-elliptical head; all are blocked. They originally had Gothic arches.	II
Bottomlock House; 53.40666°N 2.06350°W		c. 1800	The lock keeper's house is adjacent to the bottom of the flight of locks on the Peak Forest Canal. It is in stone with quoins and a slate roof. There is a double-depth plan, two storeys at the front and three at the rear, one bay, a lean-to at the rear, and an extension to the right. The door has monolithic jambs and lintel, and the windows are mullioned containing casements.	II
Culvert, Bottoms Hall; 53.39098°N 2.04820°W		c. 1800	The culvert was built to carry water under a road to Mellor's Mill, now demolished. It is in sandstone, and consists of a segmental arched tunnel about 20 yards (18 m) long, with voussoirs, rollmould decoration and plain coping, and there are supporting piers on the sides.	II
52 and 54 Moor End Road; 53.39385°N 2.01884°W	—	Late 18th to early 19th century	A pair of stone cottages on a projecting plinth with a stone-slate roof. They have a double-depth plan, three storeys, and each cottage has one bay. The doorways have square-cut surrounds, and the two-light windows are mullioned.	II
Longshaw Clough Farmhouse and farm building 53.39231°N 2.01460°W		Late 18th to early 19th century	The farmhouse and farm building are in stone with roofs of slate and stone-slate. The farmhouse has a double-depth plan and three storeys, to the left is a single-depth two-storey wing, and to the right is a five-bay farm building with outshuts. On the ground floor of the farmhouse are four workshop windows, the middle floor contains a doorway with a square cut surround approached by steps, and the windows on the upper two floors are casements with wedge lintels. In the wing are mullioned windows.	II
Tarden; 53.38964°N 2.03169°W		Late 18th to early 19th century	Originally two houses, later a farmhouse, it is in stone with a stone-slate roof. There are three storeys, a double-depth plan, two bays, and a two-storey wing to the left. The windows on the lower two floors are three-light casements and on the top floor are four two-light mullioned former workshop windows. In the right gable end is a blocked taking-in door.	II
Flood Gates Cottage; 53.38508°N 2.04915°W		1801	The cottage was for the use of the flood gate operatives. It is in stone on a projecting plinth with a pyramidal slate roof. There are two storeys and two bays, and the corners are canted. The doors and windows have square cut surrounds, some of the windows are sashes, and others are casements.	II
Marple Locks No. 1 and footbridge 53.40664°N 2.06388°W		1803–05	The lock on the Peak Forest Canal is in stone, with a single upper gate and double lower gates. The walls have a rounded verge, and the mouth is grooved. The footbridge at the lower end is in stone and consists of a rusticated segmental arch with a keystone, a band, and parapets ending in a square pier at one end and a flight of steps at the other.	II
Marple Locks No. 2 and footbridge 53.40603°N 2.06240°W		1803–05	The lock on the Peak Forest Canal is in stone, with a single upper gate and double lower gates. The walls have a rounded verge, and the mouth is grooved. The footbridge at the lower end is in stone and consists of a rusticated segmental arch with a keystone, a band, and parapets with rounded coping, and a square pier at one end and a flight of steps at the other.	II
Marple Locks No. 3 and footbridge 53.40527°N 2.06108°W		1803–05	The lock on the Peak Forest Canal is in stone, with a single upper gate and double lower gates. The walls have a rounded verge, and the mouth is grooved. The footbridge at the lower end is in stone and consists of a rusticated segmental arch with a keystone, a band, and parapets, with a square pier at one end and a flight of steps at the other.	II
Marple Locks No. 4 and footbridge 53.40429°N 2.06043°W		1803–05	The lock on the Peak Forest Canal is in stone, with a single upper gate and double lower gates. The walls have a rounded verge, and the mouth is grooved. The footbridge at the lower end is in stone and consists of a rusticated segmental arch with a keystone, a band, and parapets with rounded coping ending in square piers.	II
Marple Locks No. 5 and footbridge 53.40319°N 2.06023°W		1803–05	The lock on the Peak Forest Canal is in stone, with a single upper gate and double lower gates. The walls have a rounded verge, and the mouth is grooved. The footbridge at the lower end is in stone and consists of a rusticated segmental arch with a keystone, a band, and rebuilt parapets, with a square pier at one end and a flight of steps at the other.	II
Marple Locks No. 6 and footbridge 53.40213°N 2.05972°W		1803–05	The lock on the Peak Forest Canal is in stone, with a single upper gate and double lower gates. The walls have a rounded verge, and the mouth is grooved. The footbridge at the lower end is in stone and consists of a rusticated segmental arch with a keystone, a band, and rebuilt parapets, with a square pier at one end and a flight of steps at the other.	II
Marple Locks No. 7 and footbridge 53.40117°N 2.05944°W		1803–05	The lock on the Peak Forest Canal is in stone, with a single upper gate and double lower gates. The walls have a rounded verge, and the mouth is grooved. The footbridge at the lower end is in stone and consists of a rusticated segmental arch with a keystone, a band, and parapets, with a square pier at one end and a flight of steps at the other.	II
Marple Locks No. 8 and footbridge 53.40008°N 2.05892°W		1803–05	The lock on the Peak Forest Canal is in stone, with a single upper gate and double lower gates. The walls have a rounded verge, and the mouth is grooved. The footbridge at the lower end is in stone and consists of a rusticated segmental arch with a keystone, a band, and parapets with rounded coping, with a square pier at one end and a flight of steps at the other.	II
Marple Locks No. 9; 53.39866°N 2.05853°W		1803–05	The lock on the Peak Forest Canal is in stone, with a single upper gate and double lower gates. The walls have a rounded verge, and the mouth is grooved.	II
Marple Locks No. 10 and footbridge 53.39754°N 2.05866°W		1803–05	The lock on the Peak Forest Canal is in stone with rebuilding in brick with stone verges. They have a single upper gate and double lower gates, and the mouth is grooved. The footbridge at the lower end is in stone and consists of a rusticated segmental arch with a keystone, a band, and parapets ending in square piers.	II
Marple Locks No. 11 and footbridge 53.39683°N 2.05883°W		1803–05	The lock on the Peak Forest Canal is in stone, with a single upper gate and double lower gates. The walls have a rounded verge, and the mouth is grooved. The footbridge at the lower end is in stone and consists of a rusticated segmental arch with a keystone, a band, and parapets with rounded coping, with a square pier at one end and a flight of steps at the other.	II
Marple Locks No. 12 and footbridge 53.39572°N 2.05951°W		1803–05	The lock on the Peak Forest Canal is in stone, with a single upper gate and double lower gates. The walls have a rounded verge, and the mouth is grooved. The footbridge at the lower end is in stone and consists of a rusticated segmental arch with a keystone, a band, and parapets with rounded coping, with a square pier at one end and a flight of steps at the other.	II
Marple Locks No. 13; 53.39476°N 2.06014°W		1803–05	The lock on the Peak Forest Canal is in stone, with a single upper gate and double lower gates. The walls have a rounded verge, and the mouth is grooved.	II
Marple Locks No. 14 and footbridge 53.39415°N 2.06011°W		1803–05	The lock on the Peak Forest Canal is in stone, with a single upper gate and double lower gates. The walls have a rounded verge, and the mouth is grooved. The footbridge at the lower end is in stone and consists of a rusticated segmental arch with a keystone, a band, and parapets with rounded coping, with a square pier at one end and a flight of steps at the other.	II
Marple Locks No. 15 and footbridge 53.39355°N 2.05993°W		1803–05	The lock on the Peak Forest Canal is in stone, with a single upper gate and double lower gates. The walls have a rounded verge, and the mouth is grooved. The footbridge at the lower end is in stone and consists of a rusticated segmental arch with a keystone, a band, and parapets with rounded coping, with a square pier at one end and a flight of steps at the other.	II
Marple Locks No. 16 and footbridge 53.39298°N 2.05958°W		1803–05	The lock on the Peak Forest Canal is in stone with rebuilding in brick with stone verges. They have a single upper gate and double lower gates, and the mouth is grooved. The footbridge at the lower end is in stone and consists of a rusticated segmental arch with a keystone, a band, and parapets ending in square piers.	II
Bridge No. 18, Peak Forest Canal (Posset Bridge); 53.39493°N 2.06014°W		1804	The bridge carries Stockport Road (B6101) over the canal. It is in sandstone, and has three arches, one for the canal, one a link to the limekilns, now blocked, and a tunnel for the use of horses. The canal arches are semicircular skew arches with keystones, a pier between them, and parapets with rounded tops. The horse tunnel is a compressed horseshoe arch with a keystone, a band and square piers.	II
Bridge south of Ironbridge Cottage; 53.40781°N 2.05740°W		1805	The bridge was built to carry Rollins Lane over a drainage ditch. It is in stone and consists of a single segmental arch with a keystone on one side and a flat lintel on the other. The arch has square projections, the parapets have projecting bands and coping, and at the ends are scroll-shaped posts.	II
Lock keeper's Cottage; 53.39848°N 2.05874°W		c. 1805 (probable)	The lock keeper's cottage is adjacent to lock No. 9 on the Peak Forest Canal. It is in stone with quoins and shaped gutter brackets, and has a slate roof. There are two storeys and an outshut wing at the rear. The windows are mullioned, some with casements, and others with 20th-century replacements.	II
Weir; 53.40721°N 2.05540°W		c. 1805	The weir on the River Goyt is in stone and has a segmental shape. It is flanked by retaining walls and piers in the form of a quadrant. These have a band and coping, and at the ends are large semicircular features.	II
Remains of Church of All Saints; 53.38868°N 2.05991°W		1808–12	All that remains of the former church is the tower. This is in stone and has four stages, an arched doorway with a rusticated surround, a fanlight and a hood mould, a clock face, lancet bell openings, and a coped parapet with plain pilasters and square pinnacles.	II
Iron Bridge; 53.40863°N 2.05753°W		1813	The bridge carries Rollins Lane over the River Goyt. It has a single segmental arch with a cambered deck. The bridge is in cast iron and has five open circles in the spandrels. There are iron railings, and at the ends are stone columns with semicircular copings.	II
5 and 7 Lime Kiln Lane; 53.39279°N 2.05904°W		Early 19th century	Two houses, originally those of a manager and an apprentice, in stone with a band and a 20th-century tile roof and two storeys. The manager's house to the left has three bays, a double-depth plan, and lean-to extension. Its central doorway has a semicircular fanlight, and the windows are sashes. The apprentice's house has three smaller bays and smaller windows. At the rear are offices and a workshop.	II
24 and 26 Church Lane; 53.39440°N 2.06808°W	—	Early 19th century	A pair of stone houses, pebbledashed at the rear, with a slate roof. They have a double-depth plan, two storeys, No. 24 has two bays, and No. 26 has one. There is one casement window, the others are sashes, and they all have wedge lintels.	II
Bleak House; 53.39208°N 2.05649°W		Early 19th century	Originally a mill manager's house, it is in stone with a sill band and a stone-slate roof. There are two storeys, an attic and a basement, and three bays. The central doorway has a rusticated surround and a fanlight. The windows are sashes with rusticated surrounds, and in the gabled are windows with pointed heads.	II
Brabyns Lodge; 53.39920°N 2.05816°W		Early 19th century	The lodge to Brabyns Hall, now demolished, it is in stone with a slate roof. There are two storeys at the front, three at the rear, and a single-storey extension to the west. The ends are canted, and each end contains a blocked doorway with a moulded surround. The windows are mullioned, and some are blind.	II
Compstall Bridge; 53.41318°N 2.05410°W		Early 19th century	The bridge carries Andrew Street (B6104 road) over the River Etherow. It is in stone and consists of two segmental arches with rusticated voussoirs. The cutwaters have rounded ends, and on the bridge are bands and coped parapets ending in square piers.	II
Cotefield; 53.38838°N 2.06894°W	—	Early 19th century	A brick house, rendered at the front, on a projecting plinth, with rusticated quoins and a slate roof. There are two storeys and an attic, a double-depth plan, and three bays. In the centre is a recessed porch and a doorway with pilasters, a semi-elliptical head, and a keystone. The windows are sashes with stone sills and keystones.	II
Council Offices; 53.39617°N 2.06143°W		Early 19th century	A house, extended to the rear in the 20th century, and used as offices. It is in red brick on a stone plinth, with giant end pilasters, a band, an eaves cornice, and a hipped slate roof. There are two storeys and an entrance front of three bays. The central bay projects, and has a stone portico with Ionic columns, and above the door is a radial fanlight. The windows are sashes and in the right return is a canted bay window.	II
Hearse house, All Saints Church; 53.38880°N 2.06010°W	—	Early 19th century	The hearse house is in stone with a stone-slate roof. It has one bay, and contains a pointed arch with a rusticated surround. The keystone is carved with a skull and crossbones.	II
High Cliff Farmhouse; 53.37615°N 2.02563°W		Early 19th century	A stone farmhouse with a plain eaves cornice, a tiled roof, a double-depth plan, two storeys and three bays. The central doorway has impost blocks, a keystone, and a radial fanlight, and the windows are sashes.	II
Lockside Mill; 53.39794°N 2.05838°W		Early 19th century	A warehouse, later offices, in stone with a stone-slate roof. There are two storeys on the front and three on the canal front, and sides of seven and three bays. The central bay on the front projects and contains loading bays and a jib with a canopy above. On the right side are two shipping holes with semicircular arches and hood moulds, one blocked, and on the left side is an elliptical-arched doorway.	II
Norfolk Arms and former National Westminster Bank; 53.40167°N 2.05366°W		Early 19th century	The public house and attached bank, the latter used later for other purposes, are in stone with quoins, a dentilled eaves cornice, and a slate roof. There are two storeys, six bays, and wings to the left and rear. Above the second and third bays, which project slightly, is a pediment containing a round panel. The doorway has a radial fanlight, some of the windows are sashes, and others have been replaced by casements.	II
Otterspool Bridge; 53.40182°N 2.09692°W		Early 19th century	The bridge carries Otterspool Road (A627 road) over the River Goyt, and was widened in the 20th century using concrete for the arches. The rest of the bridge is in sandstone, and consists of three segmental arches with triangular cutwaters. Between the arches are square pilasters. The parapets have stone copings and a band, and end in square piers.	II
Stabling, All Saints Church; 53.38886°N 2.06013°W		Early 19th century	A stable and coach house in stone with a gabled stone-slate roof. It contains three carriage bays, each having a pointed arch with a keystone and impost blocks. Above the middle arch is a panel with a coat of arms.	II
Toll house 53.39264°N 2.05969°W		Early 19th century	The former toll house is opposite the top lock of the flight of locks on the Peak Forest Canal. It was extended later in the 19th century, and subsequently became a private house. The house is in stone with a hipped slate roof, and has two storeys. Originally with one bay on each front, it was extended to the rear by two bays. In the front facing the road steps lead up to a doorway on the upper floor with a timber porch. To the right is a blocked window and a board for the display of toll prices. The windows are sashes.	II
Rose Lea; 53.39018°N 2.05610°W		1820s	A pair of stone houses on a projecting plinth, with a sill band and a stone-slate roof. There are two storeys and basements, sides of three and two bays, and a brick wing at the rear. On the front is a gabled porch with two doorways. The windows are mullioned and contain sashes.	II
Scout Headquarters; 53.39403°N 2.02016°W	—	1827	Originally a Primitive Methodist Church, later used for other purposes, it is in stone with a 20th-century tile roof. There are sides of four and one bay, and there is an undercroft accessed from the rear. The round-headed doorway has a square-cut surround, impost blocks, a keystones, and a radial fanlight. The windows, which have wedge lintels, are a mix of sashes and casements.	II
Milestone near Bridge No. 5, Macclesfield Canal; 53.38041°N 2.06739°W		c. 1827	The milestone is on the towpath of the canal. It is in gritstone, with a shaped head, and indicates the distances in miles from Marple and Hall Green.	II
Bridge No. 12 Macclesfield Canal; 53.36372°N 2.07624°W		c. 1830	The bridge carries the towpath over an arm of the canal. It is in sandstone and consists of a semicircular arch. The bridge has a string course, a parapet with rounded coping, and curved walls ending in square piers.	II
Milestone near Bridge No. 10, Macclesfield Canal; 53.36743°N 2.07310°W		c. 1830	The milestone is on the towpath of the canal. It is in sandstone, with a square shaft and a shaped head, and indicates the distances in miles from Marple.	II
Bridge No. 1 Macclesfield Canal (Junction Bridge); 53.39247°N 2.05944°W		1831	A roving bridge carrying a road, Lockside, over the junction of the canal with the Peak Forest Canal. It is in stone, and consists of a single horseshoe arch with a keystone and a band. The parapet has concave walls and rounded tops, and ends in square piers. There is a spiral towpath walk.	II
Bridge No. 2 Macclesfield Canal (Church Lane Bridge); 53.39171°N 2.06119°W		1831	A roving bridge carrying Church Lane over the canal. It is in stone, and consists of a single skew horseshoe arch with a keystone and a band. The parapet has concave walls and rounded coping and ends in square piers.	II
Bridge No. 4 Macclesfield Canal (Shepley's Bridge); 53.38474°N 2.06642°W		1831	An accommodation bridge in stone consisting of an elliptical horseshoe arch. The parapet walls are convex, with a band and rounded copings, and end in square piers.	II
Bridge No. 5 Macclesfield Canal (Barnsfold Bridge); 53.38127°N 2.06803°W		1831	The bridge carries Barnsfold Road over the canal. It is in stone and consists of an elliptical horseshoe arch. The parapet walls are convex, with a band and rounded copings, and end in square piers.	II
Bridge No. 6 Macclesfield Canal (Broadhurst's Bridge); 53.37776°N 2.06633°W		1831	The bridge carries Windlehurst Road over the canal. It is in stone and consists of a skew elliptical horseshoe arch. The parapet walls are convex, with a band and rounded copings, and end in square piers.	II
Bridge No. 7 Macclesfield Canal (Hyde Road Footbridge); 53.37648°N 2.06674°W		1831	An accommodation bridge in stone consisting of an elliptical horseshoe arch. The parapet walls are convex, with a band and rounded copings, and end in square piers.	II
Bridge No. 8 Macclesfield Canal (Bancroft's Bridge); 53.37381°N 2.06938°W		1831	An accommodation bridge in stone consisting of an elliptical horseshoe arch. The parapet walls are convex, with a band and rounded copings, and end in square piers.	II
Bridge No. 9 Macclesfield Canal (Windlehurst Bridge); 53.37093°N 2.07186°W		1831	The bridge carries Andrew Lane over the canal. It is in stone and consists of a skew elliptical horseshoe arch. The parapet walls are convex, with a band and rounded copings, and end in square piers.	II
Bridge No. 10 Macclesfield Canal (Marriott's Bridge); 53.36730°N 2.07305°W		1831	The bridge carries Keswick Road over the canal. It is in stone and consists of a skew elliptical horseshoe arch. The parapet walls are convex, with a band and rounded copings, and end in square piers.	II
Bridge No. 11 Macclesfield Canal; 53.36500°N 2.07574°W		1831	The bridge carries Buxton Road (A6 road) over the canal, and consists of an elliptical horseshoe arch with a keystone. The parapets have a band and rounded copings, and end in square piers.	II
Canal warehouse 53.39233°N 2.06002°W		c. 1835	The warehouse is adjacent to bridge No. 1 over the Macclesfield Canal. It is in stone with quoins, and has a stone-slate roof with coped gables, and there are two storeys. The side facing the canal is blank and has a timber canopy. In the left side are a shipping hole, a door, and four casement windows, and on the right side steps lead to a first floor doorway.	II
149, 151 and 153 Church Lane; 53.38899°N 2.06001°W	—	Second quarter of 19th century	Three houses incorporating earlier fabric, they are in stone with a sill band and a stone-slate roof. The houses have a double-depth plan, two storeys and an attic, and five bays. On the front are three porches. The windows are sashes, all with round heads apart from the middle window on the upper floor, which has a pointed head. In the middle bay is a gabled dormer.	II
St Thomas' Church and lychgate 53.36454°N 2.07126°W		1850–51	The north aisle was added in 1866 by J. Medland Taylor. The church is in sandstone with slate roofs, and is in Norman style. It consists of a nave, a semicircular east apse, a north aisle, a south porch, vestries to the north and northeast, and a south steeple. The steeple has a tower with bands, clock faces and gargoyles, and a spire with a weathervane. At the west end is a rose window, and the other windows have round heads. At the entrance to the churchyard is a timber lych gate with a slate roof and decorative ridge tiles.	II
Marple Bridge; 53.40171°N 2.05419°W		19th century	The bridge carries Brabyns Brow over the River Goyt, and was widened in the 1930s. It is in stone, and consists of a single segmental arch with bands, a plain parapet with chamfered coping, and terminal piers.	II
Stock ends, Memorial Park, Marple; 53.39568°N 2.06152°W		19th century (probable)	The stock ends are in stone. They consist of plain posts with rounded heads, and grooves for foot restraints.	II
Stocks, St Thomas' churchyard 53.39689°N 2.02838°W		19th century	The stock ends are in the churchyard of St. Thomas' Church. They are in stone, and consist of plain square shafts with rounded heads, and grooves for foot restraints.	II
Marple Railway Viaduct; 53.40762°N 2.06833°W		1863	The viaduct was built by the Manchester, Sheffield and Lincolnshire Railway to carry its line over the River Goyt and the Peak Forest Canal. It is in stone, and consists of twelve semicircular arches, and one skew span in wrought iron as it crosses a road. The viaduct is carried on tapering piers and has a corbel table and a coped parapet wall.	II
Goyt Viaduct; 53.38572°N 2.04887°W		1865	The viaduct was built by the Manchester, Sheffield and Lincolnshire Railway to carry its line over the River Goyt. It is in stone with a wrought iron girder. There are seven semicircular arches and one iron girder over the river carried on tapering square piers with quoins. The parapet is coped and it has a band.	II
St Martin's Parish Hall and 19 Brabyns Brow; 53.40119°N 2.05701°W		1869	Originally a school and a schoolmaster's house, the latter dated 1873, and later a parish hall and a private house. They are in stone with tiled roofs. The school has two parallel ranges, a plinth, quoins, four bays, and windows with pointed arches and mullions, some also with transoms. The house has two storeys, a doorway with a pointed arch and a canopy, and mullioned windows with hood moulds.	II
St Martin's Church; 53.40092°N 2.05639°W		1869–70	The church was designed by Edmund Sedding and completed by J. D. Sedding. Henry Wilson added the north chapel in 1895–96, and the north aisle in about 1909. The church is in stone and has a clay tile roof with coped gables, and a gabled timber framed porch. It consists of a nave, a north aisle and aisle chapel, a south porch, and a chancel. On the west gable is a bellcote.	II*
Chinese Dovecote; 53.37485°N 2.03729°W		Late 19th century (probable)	The dovecote is on an island in a lake. It is wooden, with a hexagonal form, and carried on an iron pole with arabesque brackets. There are five rows of tear-shaped openings, and a canted hood with an iron finial and a weathervane in the shape of a ship.	II
All Saints Church; 53.38828°N 2.05942°W		1878–80	The church, by J. Medland and Harry Taylor, is in stone with red sandstone dressings and a slate roof. It consists of a nave with a clerestory and a chancel under one roof, north and south aisles, and a tower base at the northwest. The windows in the aisles are triple stepped lancets and in the clerestory they are triple and cusped. At the west end is a large rose window and chequerwork in the gable, and the east window has five lights.	II
St Paul's Church, Strines; 53.37474°N 2.04327°W		1880	A tin tabernacle in Gothic style that was extended in 1893 and in 1912. It is built in corrugated iron, and consists of a nave and chancel under a single roof, with a porch on the south gable, a northeast vestry, an organ chamber and a boiler house at the northwest, and on the south end is a bellcote with a spire. The windows are lancets.	II
Lychgate, All Saints Church; 53.38825°N 2.05988°W		1893	The lych gate is at the entrance to the churchyard. It is in sandstone with a timber frame and a clay tile roof. There are dwarf walls carrying a timber frame with inscribed trusses. On the ridge are small finials.	II
The Shanty, stable block, walls and gates 53.39033°N 2.05980°W	—	1896	The house, stable and coach house were designed by Richard Barry Parker in Arts and Crafts style. They are in sandstone with decorative applied timber framing, and have tiled roofs. The stable and coach house have been converted into a garage and cottage. The house has two storeys, a double-ridged roof and four bays, the middle two bays jettied. The cottage has two storeys with a jettied upper floor, and the garage has one storey, a hipped roof, and the front facing the road has a Tudor arched opening and a dovecote in the gable. The boundary wall, gates and piers are included in the listing.	II
Mile post 53.36584°N 2.07954°W		1898	The milepost is in cast iron and has a triangular plan. It is inscribed on the top with the name of the council and the date, and on the sides with the distances in miles to Stockport, Manchester, Disley, Whaley Bridge, and Buxton. Behind it is an earlier stone post with a shaped head and an illegible inscription.	II
War memorial, All Saints Church; 53.38824°N 2.05965°W	—	1920	The war memorial stands near the west front of the church. It is in Hopton Wood stone, and consists of a stepped base, a broad plinth, a socket stone, and a Celtic cross. The head of the cross has interlace decoration, and on the shaft is a carving of the Tree of Life, and other carved panels. There are inscriptions on the socket stone and the plinth, and also on the plinth are bronze panels with inscriptions and the names of those lost in the First World War.	II
War memorial, High Lane; 53.36432°N 2.07068°W		1920	The war memorial is in limestone with two steps and an octagonal plinth. It is a modified version of the Cross of Sacrifice, consisting of a Latin cross with a relief carving of a downward pointing sword. On the base of the cross shaft is a relief carving of the arms of Cheshire, and on the plinth are inscriptions and the names of those lost in the two World Wars. Behind the memorial is a low stone wall that has three projecting panels with carvings.	II
War memorial, United Reformed Church; 53.40013°N 2.05278°W		c. 1920	The war memorial stands in the churchyard of the church, and is in granite. It consists of a single-step base, a tapered plinth, and a tapering shaft with a Celtic cross. The cross and shaft are carved with interlace in relief. On the plinth is an inscription.	II
Marple war memorial 53.39591°N 2.06102°W		1922	The war memorial is in Memorial Park. It has a stepped base and an embattled plinth in polished granite, on which stands a stone statue of an allegorical female holding a cross. On the plinth are inscriptions and the names of those lost in the First World War. Flanking the memorial are two granite slabs inscribed with the names of those lost in the Second World War and in later conflicts. The whole is on a platform partly enclosed by iron railings.	II
War memorial, Mellor; 53.39423°N 2.04374°W		1920s	The war memorial stands in a triangular garden at a road junction. It is in white granite, and has a four-stepped plinth, a square panelled base, and a tall tapering shaft with a decorative capital and finial carrying a cross. On the base are panels with inscriptions and the names of those lost in the First and Second World Wars and in the Korean War.	II

== Notes and references ==
=== Sources ===
- Historic England, "Remains of Saxon Cross in graveyard of Church of St. Thomas the Apostle, Marple (1260261)", National Heritage List for England
- Historic England, "Old Manor Farm, Marple (1242469)", National Heritage List for England
- Historic England, "Church of St. Thomas the Apostle, Marple (1241990)", National Heritage List for England
- Historic England, "Spout House, Marple (1242484)", National Heritage List for England
- Historic England, "Ridge End, Marple (1242487)", National Heritage List for England
- Historic England, "Nos. 30 and 32 Mill Brow, Marple (1260106)", National Heritage List for England
- Historic England, "Barn attached to No. 261 Windlehurst Old Road, Marple (1319626)", National Heritage List for England
- Historic England, "Block of cottages (belonging to English Calico Limited), Marple (1054689)", National Heritage List for England
- Historic England, "High Cliff Cottage, Marple (1241828)", National Heritage List for England
- Historic England, "Lomber Hey House, Marple (1241806)", National Heritage List for England
- Historic England, "Lumm House, Marple (1242486)", National Heritage List for England
- Historic England, "Barn at Pear Tree Farm, Marple (1242263)", National Heritage List for England
- Historic England, "Sundial formerly from Marple Hall, Marple (1260130)", National Heritage List for England
- Historic England, "Marsden House, Marple (1319483)", National Heritage List for England
- Historic England, "Outbuilding to south-east of Ridge End, Marple (1259996)", National Heritage List for England
- Historic England, "Ridge End Cottage and adjoining farmbuilding, Marple (1242490)", National Heritage List for England
- Historic England, "Sundial in garden of Ridge End, Marple (1242488)", National Heritage List for England
- Historic England, "Spout House Farm, Marple (1242483)", National Heritage List for England
- Historic England, "Tanpit Cottage, Marple (1242092)", National Heritage List for England
- Historic England, "Wybersley Hall, Marple (1259999)", National Heritage List for England
- Historic England, "Barnsfold Manor Farm, Marple (1241820)", National Heritage List for England
- Historic England, "No. 2 Shepley Lane, Marple (1242466)", National Heritage List for England
- Historic England, "Barn adjoining Beeston Hall, Ridge Fold, Marple (1242491)", National Heritage List for England
- Historic England, "Pear Tree Farmhouse, Marple (1242216)", National Heritage List for England
- Historic England, "Mellor Hall and Mellor Hall Farmhouse, Marple (1241992)", National Heritage List for England
- Historic England, "Townscliffe Cottage and Townscliffe Farmhouse, Marple (1242492)", National Heritage List for England
- Historic England, "Wood Farmhouse, Marple (1242087)", National Heritage List for England
- Historic England, "Nos. 81 and 83 Upper Hibbert Road, Marple (1242493)", National Heritage List for England
- Historic England, "Barn to southwest of Mellor Hall, Marple (1241994)", National Heritage List for England
- Historic England, "Outbuilding to west of Mellor Hall and north of barn, Marple (1241995)", National Heritage List for England
- Historic England, "Peers Cottages, Marple (1242470)", National Heritage List for England
- Historic England, "Sundial at Mellor Hall, Marple (1241993)", National Heritage List for England
- Historic England, "Lower Dale Farmhouse, Marple (1260229)", National Heritage List for England
- Historic England, "The Cottage, Marple (1260230)", National Heritage List for England
- Historic England, "No. 34 Hollins Lane, Marple (1260232)", National Heritage List for England
- Historic England, "No. 160 Strines Road, Marple (1242482)", National Heritage List for England
- Historic England, "Manor House, Barnfold Road, Marple (1260330)", National Heritage List for England
- Historic England, "Manor House, Station Road, Marple (1242467)", National Heritage List for England
- Historic England, "No. 137 Moor End Road, Marple (1260115)", National Heritage List for England
- Historic England, "Lower Danbank Farmhouse, Marple (1242468)", National Heritage List for England
- Historic England, "Outbuildings at Lower Danbank Farm, Marple (1260024)", National Heritage List for England
- Historic England, "Middle Dale Farmhouse, Marple (1242009)", National Heritage List for England
- Historic England, "Primrose Cottage, Marple (1242011)", National Heritage List for England
- Historic England, "Roman Bridge, Marple (1242214)", National Heritage List for England
- Historic England, "Strawberry Hill, Marple (1260129)", National Heritage List for England
- Historic England, "Outbuilding to north of Wybersley Hall, Marple (1242494)", National Heritage List for England
- Historic England, "Cobden Farmhouse, Marple (1259998)", National Heritage List for England
- Historic England, "No. 225 Longhurst Lane, Marple (1242091)", National Heritage List for England
- Historic England, "The Old Court House, Marple (1241861)", National Heritage List for England
- Historic England, "Oldstones and No. 223 Longhurst Lane, Marple (1260189)", National Heritage List for England
- Historic England, "Paradise, Marple (1260228)", National Heritage List for England
- Historic England, "Tollgate Cottage, Marple (1242463)", National Heritage List for England
- Historic England, "Bottoms Bridge, Marple (1242088)", National Heritage List for England
- Historic England, "Aqueduct south-west of Peers Cottages, Strines on Peak Forest Canal, Marple (1242461)", National Heritage List for England
- Historic England, "No. 16 Bridge on Peak Forest Canal, Marple (1242268)", National Heritage List for England
- Historic England, "Routing Walls Bridge (No. 21) on Peak Forest Canal, Marple (1242451)", National Heritage List for England
- Historic England, "Peak Forest Canal, Goyt Aqueduct, Marple (1242267)", National Heritage List for England
- Historic England, "Bridge over mill stream immediately east of Bottoms Bridge, Marple (1260187)", National Heritage List for England
- Historic England, "Old Hall and Old Hall Farmhouse, Marple (1242266)", National Heritage List for England
- Historic England, "Outbuildings immediately south-east of Old Hall Farmhouse, Marple (1260117)", National Heritage List for England
- Historic England, "No. 32 Strines Road, Marple (1242481)", National Heritage List for England
- Historic England, "Lime Kiln Farm, Marple (1259993)", National Heritage List for England
- Historic England, "Walling at old lime kiln, behind No. 32 Strines Road, Marple (1242485)", National Heritage List for England
- Historic England, "Bottomlock House on Peak Forest Canal, Marple (1260088)", National Heritage List for England
- Historic England, "Culvert lO metres to north of Bottoms Hall, Marple (1319482)", National Heritage List for England
- Historic England, "Nos. 52 and 54 Moor End Road, Marple (1242265)", National Heritage List for England
- Historic England, "Longshaw Clough Farmhouse and adjoining farm building, Marple (1260116)", National Heritage List for England
- Historic England, "Tarden, Marple (1260231)", National Heritage List for England
- Historic England, "Flood Gates Cottage, Marple (1242211)", National Heritage List for England
- Historic England, "Marple Locks No. 1 and adjoining footbridge on Peak Forest Canal, Marple (1260090)", National Heritage List for England
- Historic England, "Marple Locks No. 2 and adjoining footbridge on Peak Forest Canal, Marple (1242288)", National Heritage List for England
- Historic England, "Marple Locks No. 3 and adjoining footbridge on Peak Forest Canal, Marple (1242289)", National Heritage List for England
- Historic England, "Marple Locks No. 4 and adjoining footbridge on Peak Forest Canal, Marple (1260091)", National Heritage List for England
- Historic England, "Marple Locks No. 5 and adjoining footbridge on Peak Forest Canal, Marple (1242290)", National Heritage List for England
- Historic England, "Marple Locks No. 6 and adjoining footbridge on Peak Forest Canal, Marple (1260092)", National Heritage List for England
- Historic England, "Marple Locks No. 7 and adjoining footbridge on Peak Forest Canal, Marple (1242291)", National Heritage List for England
- Historic England, "Marple Locks No. 8 and adjoining footbridge on Peak Forest Canal, Marple (1242292)", National Heritage List for England
- Historic England, "Marple Locks No. 9 on Peak Forest Canal, Marple (1242293)", National Heritage List for England
- Historic England, "Marple Locks No. 10 and adjoining footbridge on Peak Forest Canal, Marple (1242294)", National Heritage List for England
- Historic England, "Marple Locks No. 11 and adjoining footbridge on Peak Forest Canal, Marple (1242446)", National Heritage List for England
- Historic England, "Marple Locks No. 12 and adjoining footbridge on Peak Forest Canal, Marple (1242447)", National Heritage List for England
- Historic England, "Marple Locks No. 13 on Peak Forest Canal, Marple (1242448)", National Heritage List for England
- Historic England, "Marple Locks No. 14 and adjoining footbridge on Peak Forest Canal, Marple (1260015)", National Heritage List for England
- Historic England, "Marple Locks No. 15 and adjoining footbridge on Peak Forest Canal, Marple (1260016)", National Heritage List for England
- Historic England, "Marple Locks No. 16 and adjoining footbridge on Peak Forest Canal, Marple (1242450)", National Heritage List for England
- Historic England, "Posset Bridge (Number 18) on Peak Forest Canal, Marple (1260014)", National Heritage List for England
- Historic England, "Bridge south of Ironbridge Cottage, Marple (1241825)", National Heritage List for England
- Historic England, "Lock keeper's cottage adjacent to Marple Locks No. 9 on Peak Forest Canal, Marple (1260023)", National Heritage List for England
- Historic England, "Weir on River Goyt, Marple (1241826)", National Heritage List for England
- Historic England, "Remains of Church of All Saints, Marple (1241882)", National Heritage List for England
- Historic England, "Iron Bridge, Marple (1242462)", National Heritage List for England
- Historic England, "Nos. 24 and 26 Church Lane, Marple (1260260)", National Heritage List for England
- Historic England, "Nos. 5 and 7 Lime Kiln Lane, Marple (1260188)", National Heritage List for England
- Historic England, "Stabling north-west of tower of Church of All Saints, Marple (1241989)", National Heritage List for England
- Historic England, "Hearse House, north-west of tower of Church of All Saints, Marple (1260259)", National Heritage List for England
- Historic England, "Bleak House, Marple (1259994)", National Heritage List for England
- Historic England, "Brabyns Lodge, Marple (1241821)", National Heritage List for England
- Historic England, "Compstall Bridge, Marple (1242008)", National Heritage List for England
- Historic England, "Cotefield, Marple (1242012)", National Heritage List for England
- Historic England, "Council Offices, Marple (1242215)", National Heritage List for England
- Historic England, "High Cliff Farmhouse, Marple (1260306)", National Heritage List for England
- Historic England, "Lockside Mill, Marple (1242465)", National Heritage List for England
- Historic England, "Norfolk Arms and National Westminster Bank, Marple (1259997)", National Heritage List for England
- Historic England, "Otterspool Bridge, Marple (1242010)", National Heritage List for England
- Historic England, "Toll house opposite Top Lock, Marple (1242090)", National Heritage List for England
- Historic England, "Rose Lea, Marple (1241827)", National Heritage List for England
- Historic England, "Milestone at SJ 9566 8694 on Macclesfield Canal, Marple (1117080)", National Heritage List for England
- Historic England, "First Mellor and Marple Bridge Scout Headquarters, Marple (1242264)", National Heritage List for England
- Historic England, "Bridge No. 12 over High Lane Arm at SJ 9502 8519 on Macclesfield Canal, Marple (1117079)", National Heritage List for England
- Historic England, "Milestone adjacent to Bridge No. 10 on Macclesfield Canal, Marple (1260128)", National Heritage List for England
- Historic England, "Bridge No. 1 (Junction Bridge) on Macclesfield Canal, Marple (1260190)", National Heritage List for England
- Historic England, "Bridge No. 2 (Church Lane Bridge) on Macclesfield Canal, Marple (1242140)", National Heritage List for England
- Historic England, "Bridge No. 4 (Shepley's Bridge) on Macclesfield Canal, Marple (1260182)", National Heritage List for England
- Historic England, "Bridge No. 5 (Barnsfold Bridge) on Macclesfield Canal, Marple (1242154)", National Heritage List for England
- Historic England, "Bridge No. 6 (Broadhurst's Bridge) Macclesfield Canal (1242155)", National Heritage List for England
- Historic England, "Bridge No. 7 (Hyde Road Footbridge) on Macclesfield Canal, Marple (1260144)", National Heritage List for England
- Historic England, "Bridge No. 8 (Bancroft's Bridge) on Macclesfield Canal, Marple (1242156)", National Heritage List for England
- Historic England, "Bridge No. 9 (Windlehurst Bridge) on Macclesfield Canal, Marple (1260145)", National Heritage List for England
- Historic England, "Bridge No. 10 (Marriott's Bridge) Macclesfield Canal (1242206)", National Heritage List for England
- Historic England, "Bridge No. 11 on Macclesfield Canal, Marple (1242157)", National Heritage List for England
- Historic England, "Canal warehouse adjacent to Bridge No. 1 (Junction Bridge), Marple (1242093)", National Heritage List for England
- Historic England, "Nos. 149, 151 and 153 Church Lane, Marple (1241862)", National Heritage List for England
- Historic England, "Marple Bridge, Marple (1241824)", National Heritage List for England
- Historic England, "Stocks in graveyard of Church of St. Thomas the Apostle, Marple (1241991)", National Heritage List for England
- Historic England, "Stock ends, Marple (1242244)", National Heritage List for England
- Historic England, "Church of St Thomas and Lychgate, Marple (1403103)", National Heritage List for England
- Historic England, "Marple Railway Viaduct (1242213)", National Heritage List for England
- Historic England, "Goyt Viaduct, Marple (1242212)", National Heritage List for England
- Historic England, "Canal warehouse adjacent to Bridge No. 1 (Junction Bridge), Marple (1242093)", National Heritage List for England
- Historic England, "St Martin's Parish Hall and No. 19 Brabyns Brow, Marple (1241822)", National Heritage List for England
- Historic England, "Church of St. Martin, Marple (1241823)", National Heritage List for England
- Historic England, "The Chinese Dovecot on Island In Lake to premises occupied by English Calico Limited, Marple (1088124)", National Heritage List for England
- Historic England, "New Church of All Saints, Marple (1260309)", National Heritage List for England
- Historic England, "St Paul's Church, Marple (1400599)", National Heritage List for England
- Historic England, "Lychgate to Church of All Saints, Marple (1241863)", National Heritage List for England
- Historic England, "The Shanty, Stable Block, Boundary Wall, Gates and Piers, Marple (1439977)", National Heritage List for England
- Historic England, "Mile post at junction with Middlewood Road, Marple (1260308)", National Heritage List for England
- Historic England, "War Memorial outside All Saints' Church, Marple (1448054)", National Heritage List for England
- Historic England, "High Lane War Memorial, Marple (1403193)", National Heritage List for England
- Historic England, "Marple Bridge United Reformed Church War Memorial, Marple (1447120)", National Heritage List for England
- Historic England, "Marple War Memorial (1447174)", National Heritage List for England
- Historic England, "Mellor War Memorial, Marple (1424597)", National Heritage List for England
- Historic England, Listed Buildings
- Hartwell, Clare; Hyde, Matthew; Hubbard, Edward; Pevsner, Nikolaus (2011) [1971], Cheshire, The Buildings of England, Yale University Press, ISBN 978-0-300-17043-6
