= Old Manor Farm, Marple =

Listed building in Greater Manchester, England

Old Manor Farm
- Location within Greater Manchester

General information
- Location: Stockport Road, Marple, Greater Manchester, England
- Coordinates: 53.3949°N 2.092°W
- Year built: c. 15th century

Technical details
- Structural system: Timber-framed

Design and construction
- Designations

Listed Building – Grade II*
- Official name: Old Manor Farm
- Designated: 20 December 1967
- Reference no.: 1242469

Old Manor Farm is a 15th-century hall on Stockport Road in Marple, a town within the Metropolitan Borough of Stockport, historically in Cheshire, now within Greater Manchester, England. Built in the 15th century, it has had additions made in the 16th, 17th and 20th centuries. Called "one of the finest existing examples of a small medieval manor house in Lancashire or Cheshire", it is a Grade II* listed building.

Marple has five nationally important buildings, listed by Historic England as either Grade I or Grade II. One of these is Old Manor Farm, tucked away above the Marple Brook which runs in the valley near Dan Bank. Described by Pevsner as "a small medieval manor house, the central part timber-framed, probably 15th-century, with a two-bay hall of cruck construction. Later wings were added, the service wing of stone, the other half-timber." Its importance was recognised in 1951 when it was featured in Cheshire Life magazine as one of the "Homes of Cheshire".

== See also ==
- Grade II* listed buildings in Greater Manchester
- Listed buildings in Marple, Greater Manchester
