= All Saints Church, Marple =

Coordinates: 53.3883°N 2.0594°W

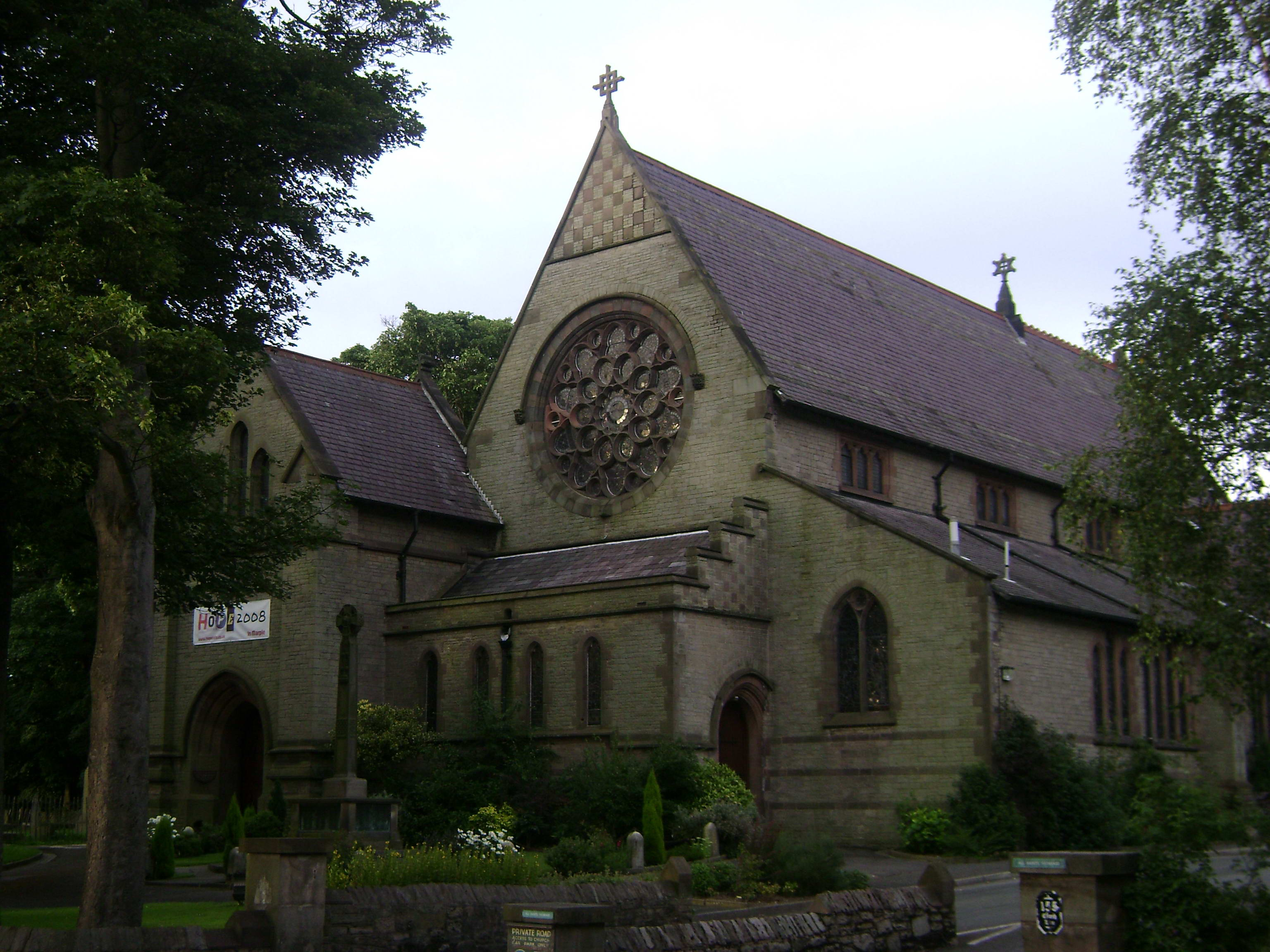
- All Saints Church, Marple

- Location in Greater Manchester
- OS grid reference: SJ 962 878
- Location: Church Lane, Marple, Greater Manchester
- Country: England
- Denomination: Anglican
- Website: All Saints, Marple

History
- Status: Parish church
- Dedication: All Saints
- Consecrated: 30 June 1880

Architecture
- Functional status: Active
- Heritage designation: Grade II
- Designated: 11 October 1985
- Architect(s): J. Medland Taylor and Henry Taylor
- Architectural type: Church
- Style: Gothic Revival
- Completed: 1880
- Construction cost: £6,056

Specifications
- Materials: Stone, tiled roof

Administration
- Province: York
- Diocese: Chester
- Archdeaconry: Macclesfield
- Deanery: Chadkirk
- Parish: Marple, All Saints

Clergy
- Vicar: Rev Daniel Currie

All Saints Church is in Church Lane, Marple, Greater Manchester, England. It is recorded in the National Heritage List for England as a designated Grade II listed building. In the churchyard is the tower of an earlier church, which is also listed at Grade II. The church is an active Anglican parish church in the diocese of Chester, the archdeaconry of Macclesfield and the deanery of Chadkirk.

== History ==
The first church on the site was a small timber-framed building erected in the second half of the 16th century. The first recorded service took place in 1588. In 1803 the building was in a ruinous condition and it was decided that a new church should be built. In 1808 Robert Goldsmith was appointed as architect and the church was completed in 1811 at a cost of £4,000 (equivalent to £280,000 in 2025). A major financial contributor to the building of the church was Samuel Oldknow, a local cotton manufacturer. In 1816 a peal of bells arrived and in 1826 an organ was installed. By the 1870s the church was too small for the congregation and the building was unsuitable for expansion so it was decided that a new church should be built. The new church was built 30 metres (98 ft) to the south of the old church. J. Medland Taylor and Henry Taylor were appointed as architects and the church cost £6,056 (equivalent to £630,000 in 2025). It was consecrated on 30 June 1880. In the following years some services were still held in the old church but its condition deteriorated and by 1964 it was considered to be dangerous and (save its tower) it was demolished. The tower was strengthened and the bells re-hung in it, making it a free-standing bell-tower.

== Architecture ==
=== Tower ===
The separate tower is in four stages with string courses between the stages. At the west is a door with a rusticated surround and a two-light window. In the third stage is a clock face. Above this are lancet bell openings. The parapet has plain pilasters and square pinnacles.

Inside the tower are memorials. Pevsner considers that the best is a tablet by John Flaxman in memory of Rev. Kelsall Prescot, who died in 1823, showing him standing and instructing boys. The monument to Samuel Oldknow, who died in 1828, is by Francis Legatt Chantrey, but Pevsner considers it to be disappointing. A monument to Elizabeth Isherwood, who died in 1835, is by Manning and shows a woman kneeling by an urn. Other monuments are to Nathaniel Wright who died in 1818, showing a cherub with an extinguished torch, and to John Clayton who died in 1848 and shows a standing woman with a lamp and a torch.

There is a ring of eight bells. Six of these, which came from Stockport parish church in 1816, were cast by Rudhall of Gloucester in 1731. The other two bells are by John Taylor and Company and are dated 1963.

=== Church ===
The church is built in stone with a patterned tiled roof. Its plan consists of a three-bay nave with a clerestory, north and south aisles, and a two-bay chancel. At the east end is a five-light window and at the west end is a rose window.

In the church the chandelier and font were removed from the old church. Also in the church are memorials to the Bradshaw-Isherwood family. The organ was built by Conacher and Wadsworth and extended by Walker in 1972. The parish registers date from 1655.

== External features ==
The lych gate dated 1893 is listed at Grade II. Also listed at Grade II are a stable and coach house from the early 19th century erected for the use of the owner of Marple Hall when visiting the church, and the adjacent hearse house, also dating from the early 19th century.

The churchyard contains the war graves of nine soldiers of World War I and two soldiers and two airmen of World War II.

== Gallery ==
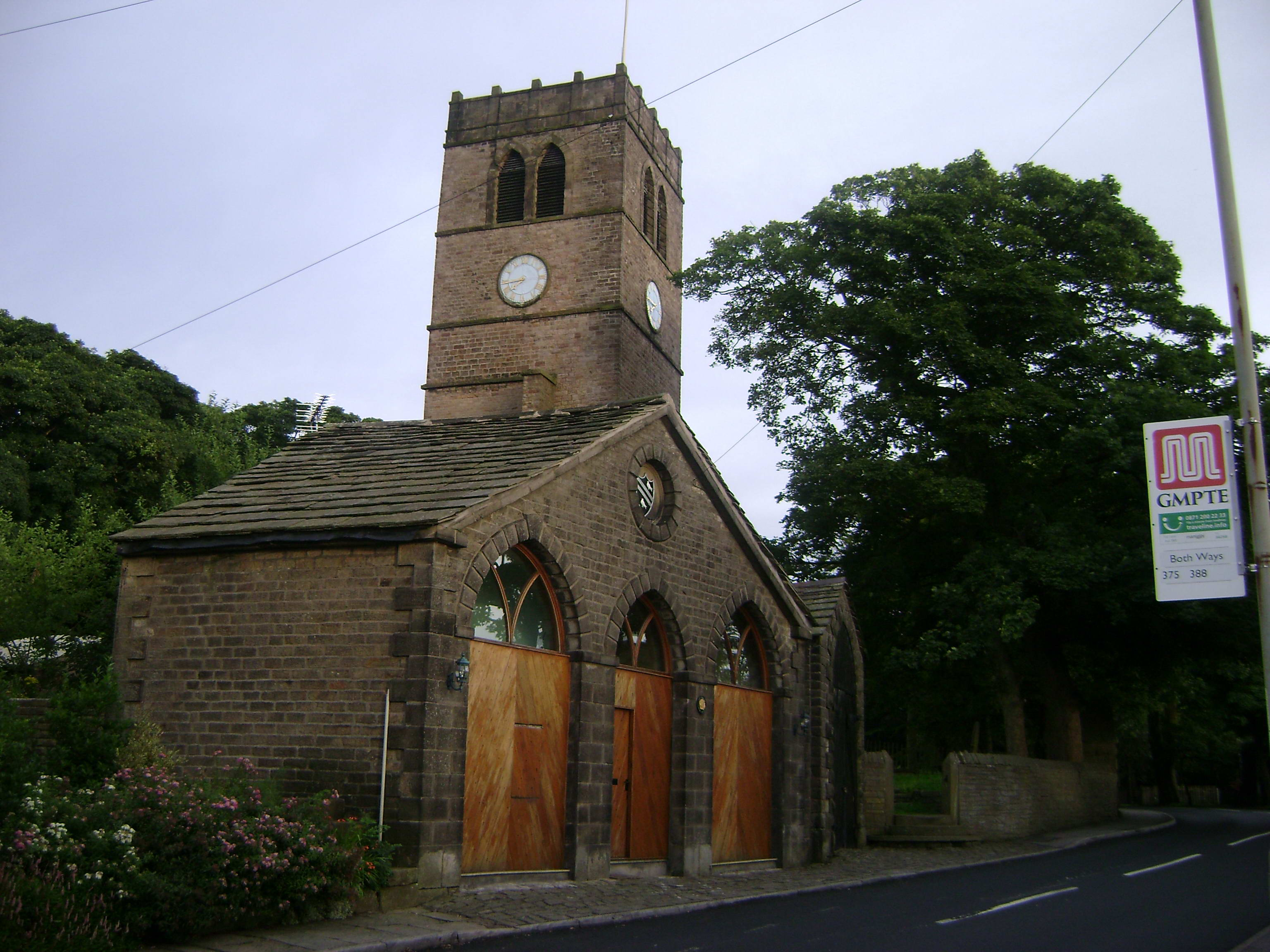
The stables (left) and the coach house (right) with the tower of the old church in the background

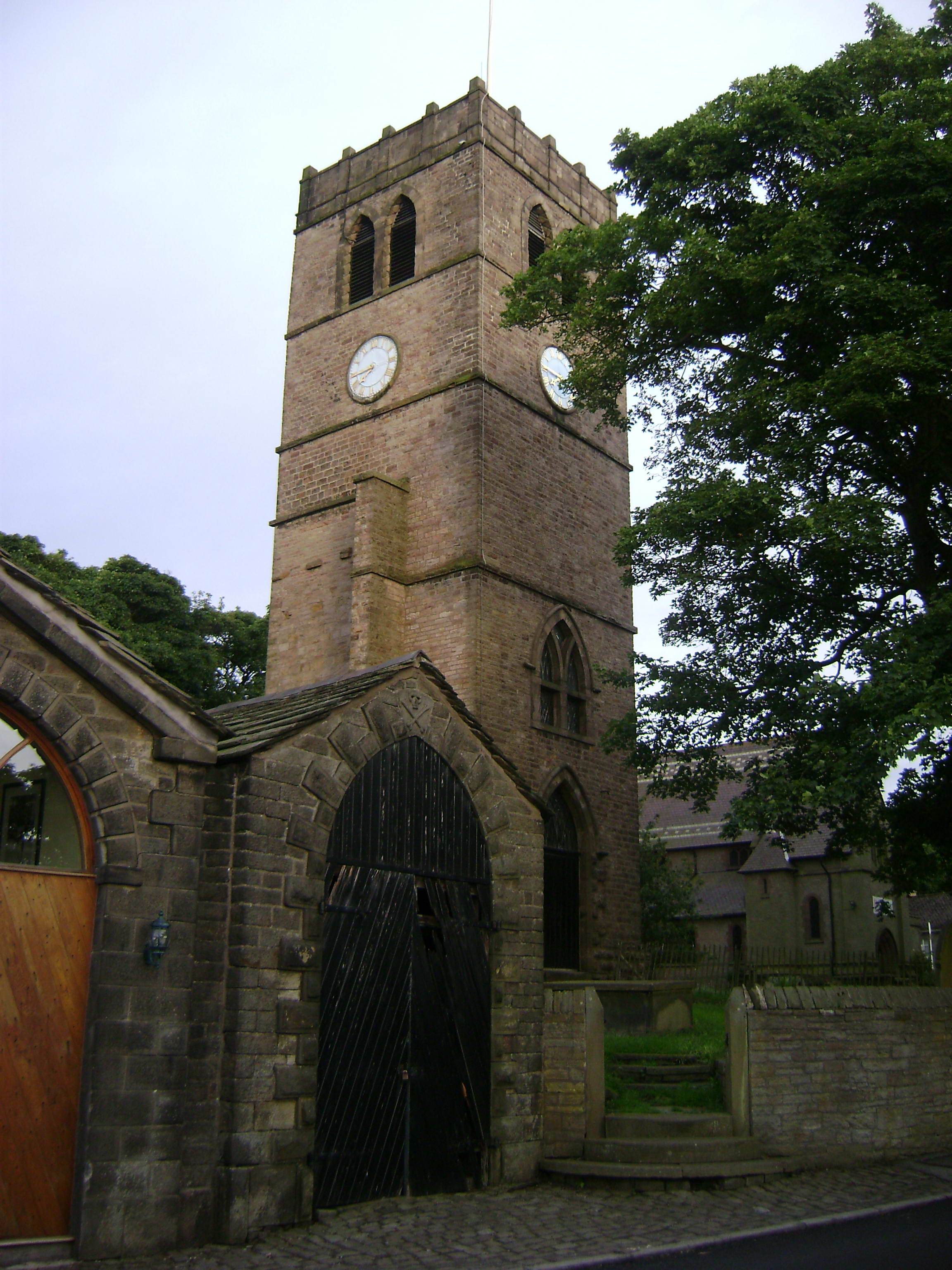
The tower of the old church with the coach house in the foreground

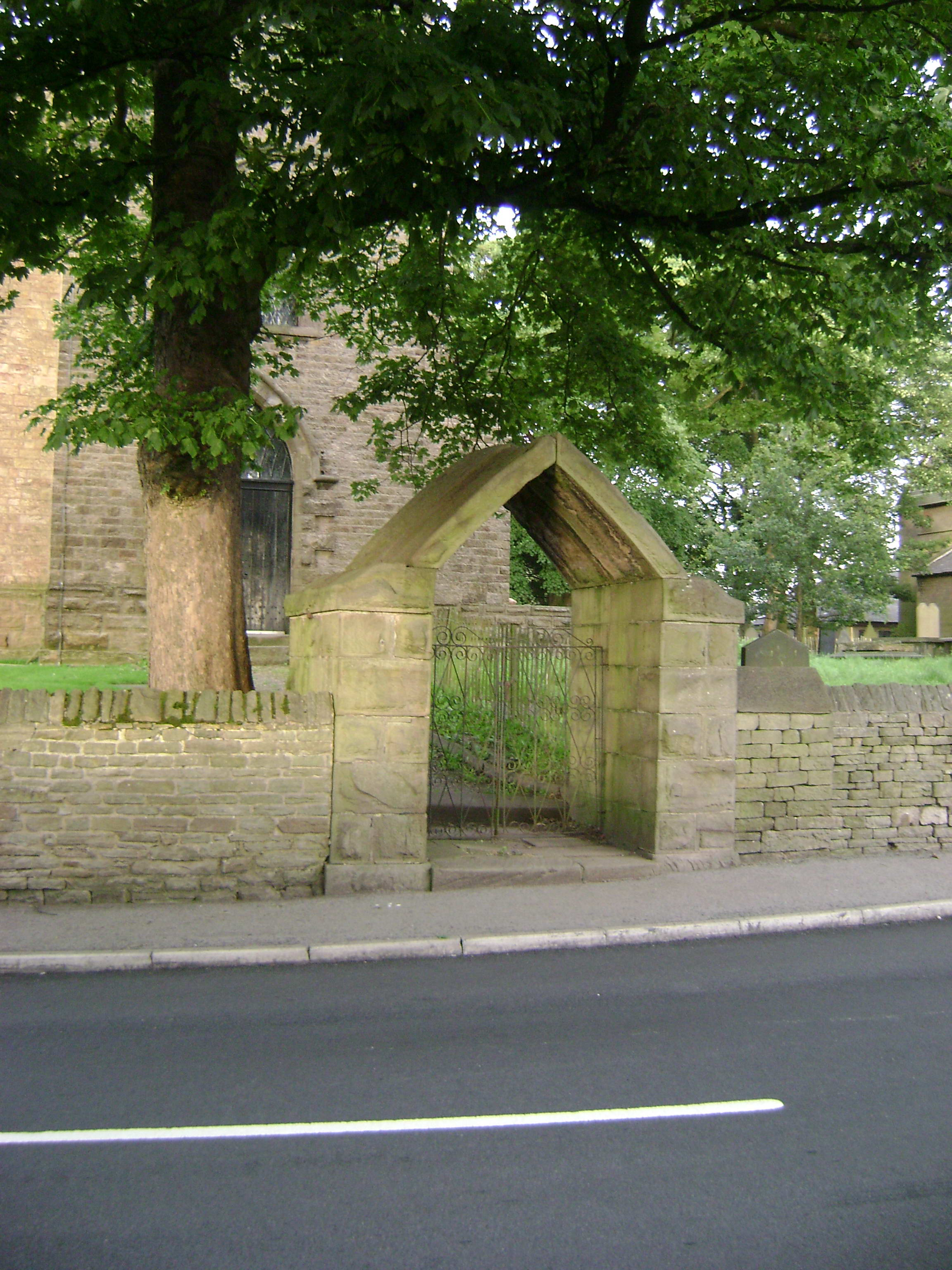
The gate to the old church

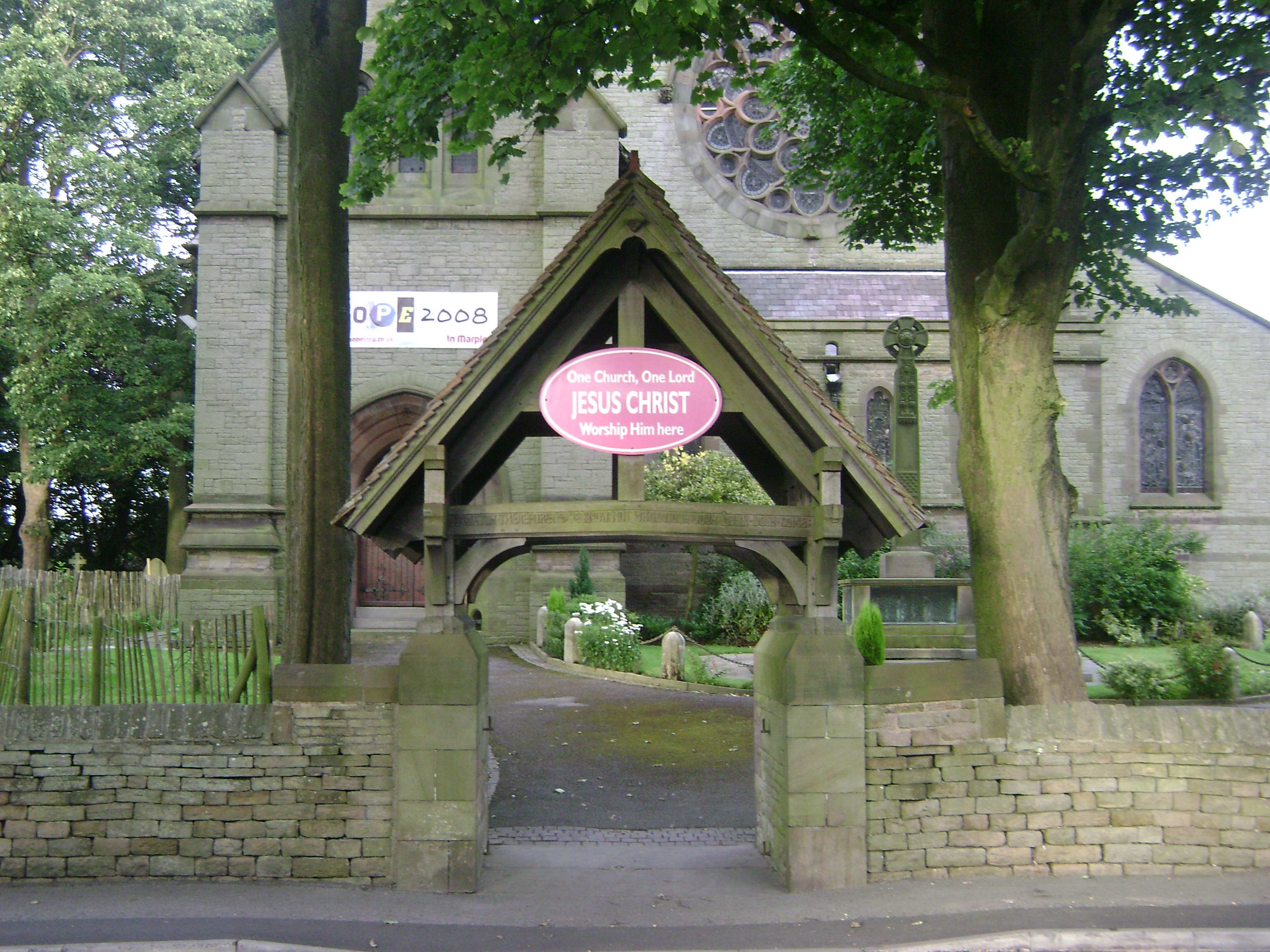
The lych gate to All Saints' Church from Church Lane

== See also ==
- List of churches in Greater Manchester
- Listed buildings in Marple, Greater Manchester
