= Mellor, Greater Manchester =

Village in Greater Manchester, England

Coordinates: 53.396°N 2.028°W

Mellor
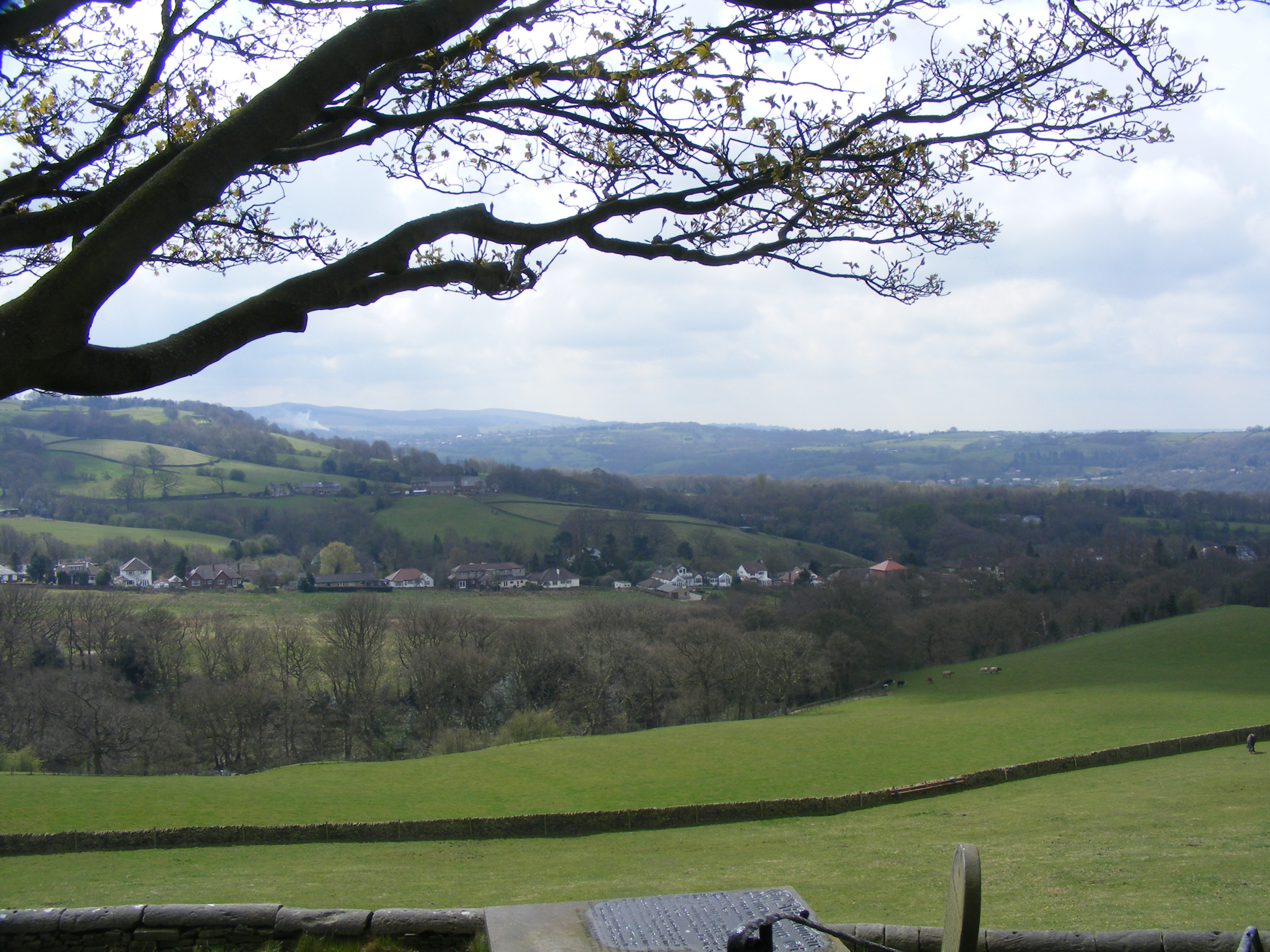
- View of the village from the churchyard

- Location within Greater Manchester
- Population: 2,394
  - Density: 2,771/sq mi (1,070/km^{2})
- OS grid reference: SJ990880
- Metropolitan borough: Stockport
- Metropolitan county: Greater Manchester
- Region: North West
- Country: England
- Sovereign state: United Kingdom
- Post town: STOCKPORT
- Postcode district: SK6
- Dialling code: 0161
- Police: Greater Manchester
- Fire: Greater Manchester
- Ambulance: North West
- UK Parliament: Hazel Grove

Mellor is a village in the Stockport district, in Greater Manchester, England; it lies between Marple Bridge and New Mills in Derbyshire.

It was a civil parish in the county of Derbyshire until 1936, when it was transferred to Cheshire. In 1974, it became part of the Metropolitan Borough of Stockport, in Greater Manchester.

== Etymology ==
The name Mellor is first attested in the thirteenth century, in the forms Melver and Meluer. Its origin lies in the Common Brittonic words which survive in modern Welsh as moel ("bare") and bre ("hill"). Thus the name once meant "the bare hill".

== History ==
The name Mellor does not appear in the Norman-era Domesday Book, although the neighbouring settlement of Ludworth (recorded as Lodeuorde) is listed. It is possible that Ludworth originally included Mellor and that they split into two distinct areas at a later date.

The Saxons built a church at the southernmost end of the Iron Age settlement at some point in the 7th or 8th centuries. The church was subsequently destroyed and rebuilt, possibly several times. St. Thomas' Church has the oldest known wooden pulpit in Britain, possibly the world. Dating from the reign of Edward II (1307–1327), it is octagonal and carved from a single piece of wood. The church also has a 12th-century font.

According to local legend, Mellor Hall is built on the foundations of the house of a Norman nobleman. During excavations of the Iron Age hill fort, a 13th-century hall was discovered. By the time of the English Civil War, Marple had become important in the region, so much so that John Bradshawe, Lord President of the High Court of Justice and Lord of Marple Hall, was the first to sign the death warrant of King Charles I.

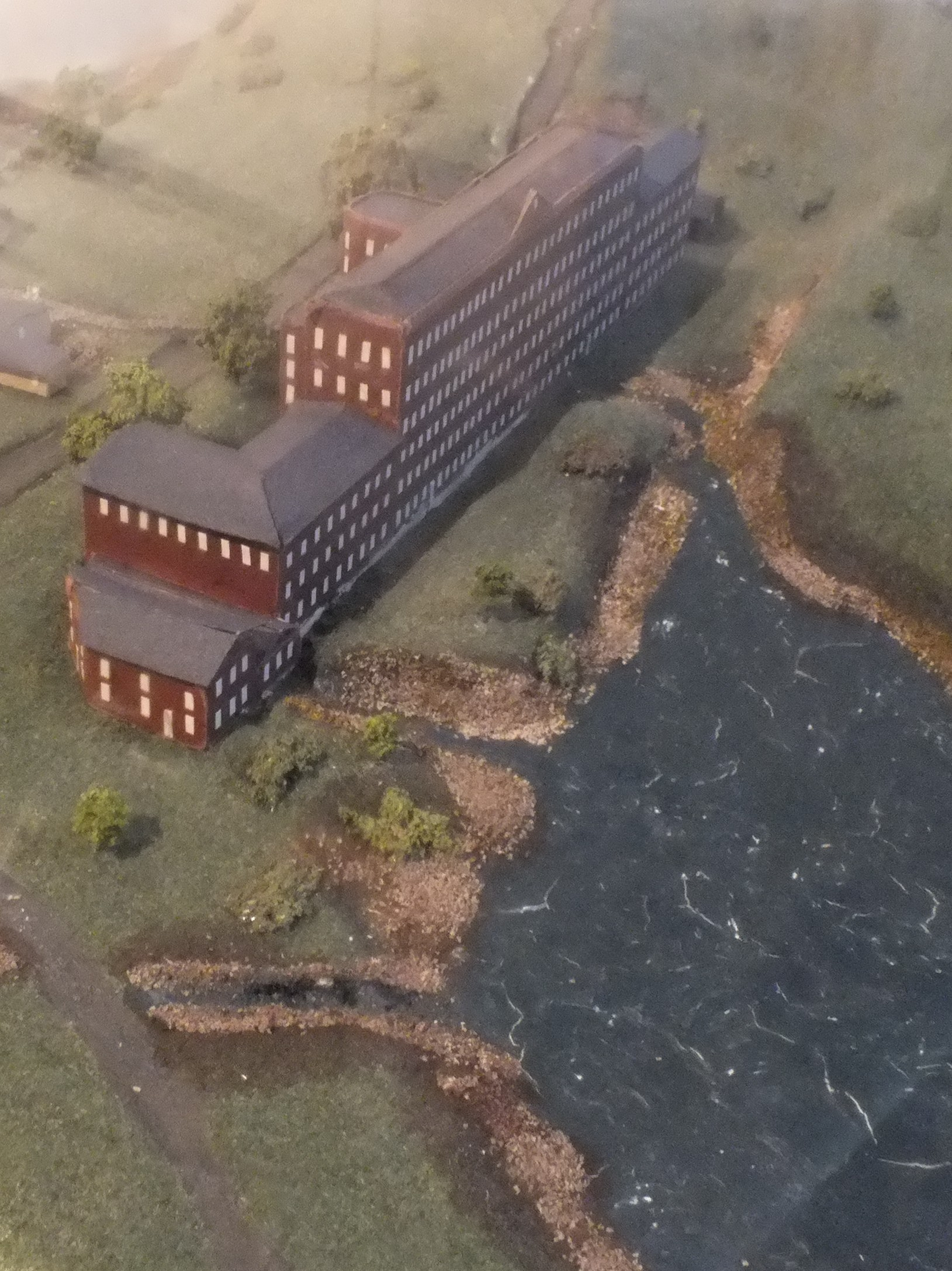
A model of Mellor Mill and the "Roman Lakes"

Samuel Oldknow was a significant businessman and mill owner in Mellor during the Industrial Revolution. Just across the River Goyt are the "Roman Lakes". These are not Roman, but were water reservoirs for Samuel Oldknow's Mellor Mill, a cotton mill that was a major employer in the area during the Industrial Revolution. The mill was destroyed by fire in November 1892.

At the height of the Industrial Revolution, coal-power supplanted water-power as the driving force and minable coal seams were found in Mellor. Relatively recently, British Coal strip-mined the seams that still contained commercially viable coal.

Before it expanded in the Victorian era, Mellor was a small village of a few houses; it included the hamlet of Moorend, now considered part of Mellor.

== Geography ==
Mellor lies in the foothills of the Pennines, just outside of the area of Derbyshire known as the High Peak. Nearby villages include Rowarth, Marple Bridge, Ludworth and Mill Brow. The town of Marple lies across the River Goyt. A little further away are the towns of Romiley and New Mills, and the villages of Hayfield and Strines. Mellor Church and Mellor Hall are on a ridge, separated from the bulk of the village by a gully and stream.

The oldest part of inhabited Mellor runs alongside the River Goyt, stretching from the oldest parts of Marple Bridge up the hill and spreading out where the slope becomes gentler. Newer parts of the village run down Longhurst Lane, the old turnpike road, and into former farmland released for building by Townscliffe Farm. At the very top of Mellor is the junction of Five Ways; one of these roads runs to Mellor, a second to Rowarth, a third to Strines and New Mills, the fourth to a water treatment plant and a fifth to many farms on the edge of Mellor. Spoil heaps indicate mining operations here; coal was mined in the general area during the Industrial Revolution.

Due to its topology, Mellor lies on one of the easier points for entering the Pennines from the Mersey Basin by road or foot. It is also on the flight path for air traffic into Manchester Airport.

=== Geology ===
Mellor is within a gritstone area in a part of the Peak District referred to as the Dark Peak; in contrast, the limestone region of the Peak District is referred to as the White Peak. The underlying geology of the area belongs to the Carboniferous Millstone Grit series, which outcrop as the Middle Grit. Below this are shales, mudstones and older Gritstones, such as the Kinder Scout Grit which forms the Kinder Plateau to the east. Boulder clay, left from the Ice Age, can usually be found just below the surface-level soil. At one point, all of the Peak District – Mellor included – was submerged beneath relatively warm waters; evidence for this is the limestone region, with the limestone containing fossils of coral and other shallow-depth warm-water creatures.

The gritstone comes from deposits laid down about 300 million years ago over the limestone. Shallow coal deposits lie on top of the gritstone, although most of these have long since been mined. Very deep coal deposits occur further into the Pennines but, again, many of these have been worked out.

The soil in Mellor is fairly rich in peat and can bog easily, but there are no permanent peat bogs within Mellor itself. The only other noteworthy detail on Mellor's geology is the almost complete absence of iodine, particularly in the water of the River Goyt. If no other source of iodine is in the diet, the consequent iodine deficiency can lead to an enlarged thyroid gland, a condition known as "Derbyshire Neck" or goitre.

== Governance ==
Mellor was formerly a township and chapelry in the parish of Glossop. In 1866, Mellor became a separate civil parish; the parish was abolished and merged with Marple on 1 April 1936 and became part of Marple Urban District in Cheshire. In 1931, the parish had a population of 1712. In 1974, it became part of the Stockport district in Greater Manchester.

== Demography ==
Mellor compared
2001 UK census	Mellor	Stockport (borough)	England
Total population	2,394	284,528	49,138,831
White	98.2%	95.7%	90.9%
Asian	1.4%	2.1%	4.6%
Black	0%	0.4%	2.3%

According to the Office for National Statistics, at the time of the 2001 Census, Mellor had a population of 2,394. The 2001 population density was 2,771 inhabitants per square mile (1,070/km^{2}), with a 100 to 92.1 female-to-male ratio. Of those over 16 years old, 18.8% were single (never married), 54.6% married and 6.6% divorced. This was significantly different to the borough and country figures, with a higher rate of marriages and fewer single people. Mellor's 1,070 households included 27.4% one-person, 43.5% married couples living together, 5.7% were co-habiting couples and 5.9% single parents with their children. Of those aged 16–74, 20.9% had no academic qualifications.

At the 2001 UK census, 88.4% of Mellor's residents reported themselves as Christian, 1.0% Muslim and 0.2% Hindu. The census recorded 5.8% as having no religion, 0.2% had an alternative religion and 4.4% did not state their religion.

=== Population change ===
Population growth in Mellor from 1861 to 1931
Year	1861	1871	1881	1891	1901	1911	1921	1931
Population	1,733	1,447	1,242	1,096	1,218	1,711	1,876	1,712
Source: A Vision of Britain through Time

== Economy ==
Mellor compared
2001 UK Census	Mellor	Stockport (borough)	England
Population of working age	1,789	151,445	35,532,091
Full-time employment	38.8%	43.3%	40.8%
Part-time employment	12.0%	12.5%	11.8%
Self employed	12.4%	8.4%	8.3%
Unemployed	1.6%	2.5%	3.3%
Retired	21.7%	14.8%	13.5%

A few small businesses work out of the old mills that scatter the countryside. There is a limited amount of farming, principally grazing livestock of sheep and beef cattle. Horses are also common and horse-riding is a popular pursuit in the area, which benefits from many ancient bridleways.

According to the 2001 UK census, the industry of employment of residents of Mellor aged 16–74 was 18.3% manufacturing, 16.3% retail and wholesale, 12.2% health and social work, 12.0% education, 11.7% property and business services, 6.6% public administration, 4.6% construction, 4.5% transport and communications, 4.2% hotels and restaurants, 2.7% finance, 2.0% agriculture, 0.7% energy and water supply, and 4.2% other. Compared with national figures, the town had a relatively high proportion of people working in education, agriculture and public administration, with low levels of people working in finance, transport and communications. The census recorded the economic activity of residents aged 16–74, 1.8% students were with jobs, 3.4% students without jobs, 3.1% looking after home or family, 4.1% permanently sick or disabled, and 1.1% economically inactive for other reasons.

== Notable people ==
- Samuel Oldknow (1756–1828), an English cotton manufacturer, died locally.
- William Radcliffe (1761? – 1842), a mill owner and inventor for improving the textile industry; author of the essay Origin of the New System of Manufacture, Commonly Called Power Loom Weaving.
- Tom Lowe (born 1978), English singer and actor.

=== Sport ===
- Er Arnfield (1853–1945), football manager, secretary/manager of Southampton 1897/1911 and 1912/1919.
- Arthur Morton (1883–1935), an English cricketer who played 357 First-class cricket games
- Bob Harrison (1906–1965), an international speedway rider who featured in the final of the first Speedway World Championship in 1936.

== Amenities ==
Buildings in the village include St. Thomas' Church, a primary school, golf course, sports club and a riding school.

There are three pubs: the Royal Oak, the Devonshire Arms and the Oddfellows Arms.

== Transport ==
Mellor is served by three bus routes:

- 385, operated by Diamond Bus North West, runs between Stockport, Marple and Hazel Grove; the service is hourly on weekdays
- 802 and 819 school services also run between Mellor, Marple Hall School and Harrytown Catholic High School respectively, operated by Metroline Manchester.

The village does not have its own railway station. The closest is Marple, on the Hope Valley Line; Northern Trains provides services between Manchester Piccadilly, New Mills Central and Sheffield.

== Sport ==
Lacrosse

Mellor Lacrosse Team has enjoyed success in its 80-year history, winning the North of England men's championship on many occasions, the most recent being 2006. The club has three men's senior teams and a junior section; it has recently created a ladies team. The club also regularly plays host to touring teams from the US at junior and senior level.

Football

Mellor Football Club was founded in 1923 by members of the Hambleton Family. Mellor FC's home ground is Wood Lane in Marple and the club currently boasts four open-age teams. Mellor 1st XI are currently in the Premier Division of the Lancashire & Cheshire League and won the Stockport Senior Cup in the 2004–05 season.

Cricket

Mellor Cricket Club had two senior teams that played in the Derbyshire and Cheshire League, having previously played in the Glossop and District League for many years and, before that, in the High Peak League. They now play in the Cheshire County League 3rd XI Saturday Division 2 as Marple-Mellor, having resigned from the Derbyshire and Cheshire League in 2008.

Tennis

The tennis club was formed between 1945 and 1950. It originally had only one grass court; this was later extended to include two shale courts and later to include two all-weather courts. These were then replaced with astroturf. It has three men's and three ladies' teams in the Slazenger North East Cheshire League.

Badminton

Mellor's badminton club has eight teams: two teams in the Tameside Badminton League, three in the Stockport Badminton League and three Junior teams in the Stockport Badminton League.

Golf

The golf course runs through a sparsely populated section of the oldest inhabited part of Mellor. The course offers a view over Greater Manchester and, on a clear day, the Welsh Mountains can be seen.

== Societies ==
There are a number of societies within Mellor, ranging from church activities to painting and rambling.

Some of these societies run charitable events in the area. For example, every four years, the local residents open a number of private gardens during an event known as the Mellor Open Gardens day. The purpose of the event is to raise funds for Cancer Research UK and the support of the local Parish Centre. Another event is the Mellor March, in which ramblers carry out a sponsored walk to traverse the boundary of Mellor.

== See also ==
- Listed buildings in Marple, Greater Manchester
