= St Thomas' Church, Mellor =

Coordinates: 53.3969°N 2.0287°W

St. Thomas' Church, Mellor, Stockport
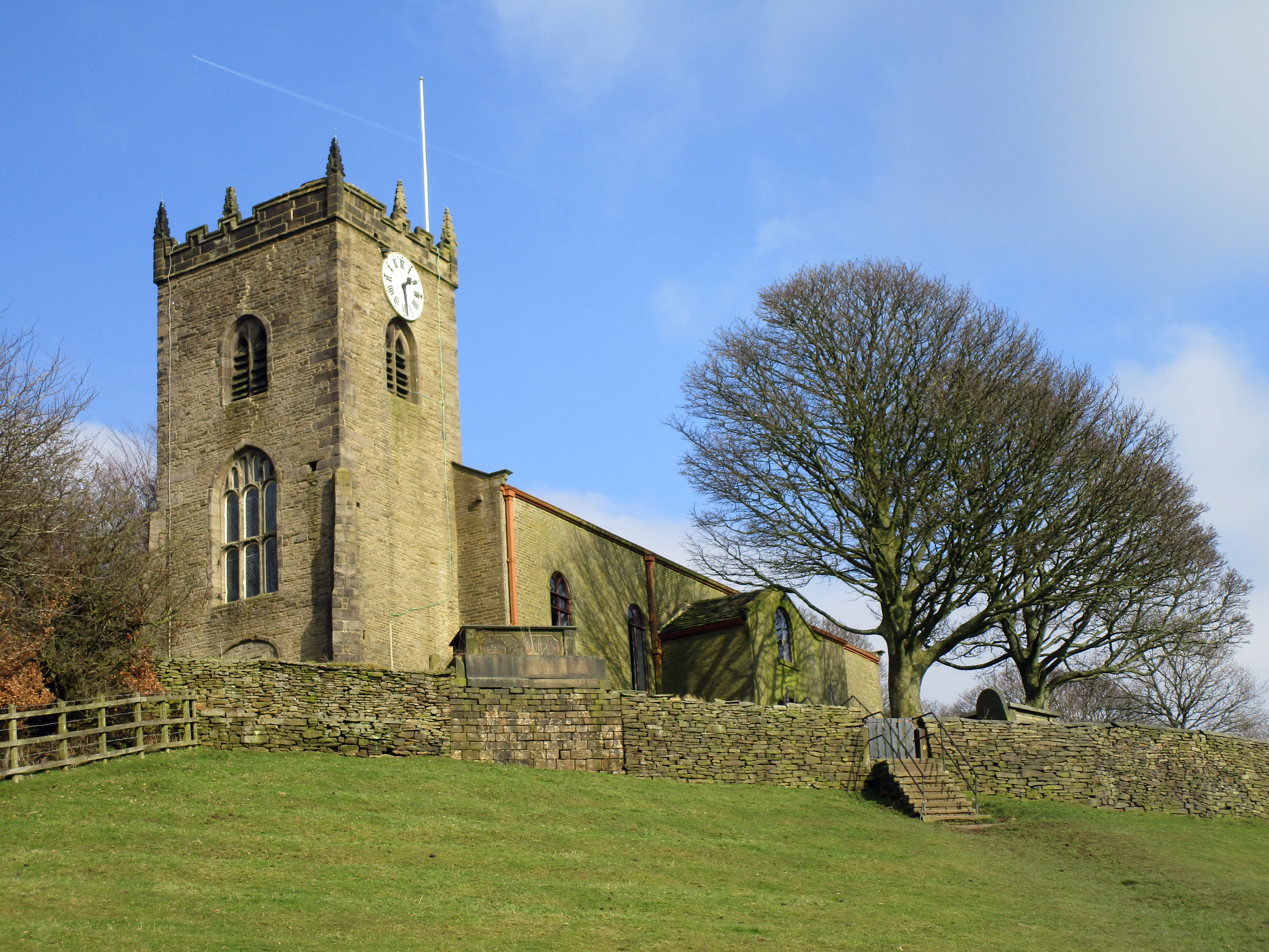
- St. Thomas' Church, Mellor, from the southeast

- Location in Greater Manchester
- OS grid reference: SJ 982 889
- Location: Mellor, Greater Manchester
- Country: England
- Denomination: Anglican
- Website: https://mellorchurch.org/

History
- Status: Parish church
- Dedication: St Thomas

Architecture
- Functional status: Active
- Heritage designation: Grade II
- Designated: 20 December 1967
- Architectural type: Church
- Style: Gothic

Specifications
- Capacity: 200
- Materials: Stone

Administration
- Province: York
- Diocese: Chester
- Archdeaconry: Macclesfield
- Deanery: Chadkirk
- Parish: Mellor

Clergy
- Vicar: Rev'd Andrew Tawn

St. Thomas' Church is at the top of a lane overlooking the village of Mellor, Greater Manchester, England, with views over Manchester, Cheshire and beyond. It is recorded in the National Heritage List for England as a designated Grade II listed building. The church contains the oldest wooden pulpit in England and a late 12th-century Norman font. It is an active Anglican parish church in the deanery of Chadkirk, the archdeaconry of Macclesfield, and the diocese of Chester.

== History ==
The first stone building was probably erected in the early 14th century. In 1783 the walls were partly rebuilt and galleries were constructed on the south and east walls. At this time the church could seat 700 people. In 1815 a new entrance and porch were built and the south wall was repaired. In 1827–29 the chancel and the north wall were reconstructed to designs by the antiquarian Thomas Rickman. In 1885 the east gallery was removed. In the first decade of the 20th century the south and west galleries were demolished. In 1960, a death watch beetle was found in the roof and the roof was replaced. The screen was moved from the front of the nave to its present position at the rear creating a new chapel at the west end. A new Mander organ was installed in 1977.

The tower dates from the 15th century, it was built on 12th-century foundations, and the rest of the church dates from its rebuilding in the early 19th century.

== Architecture ==
=== Exterior ===
The church is built in stone. Its plan consists of a west tower, a four-bay nave, a one-bay chancel and a south porch. At the east end is a pointed-arch window. The tower is in three stages and has a west door and window, two-light bell openings above which are clock faces, and a castellated parapet with finials.

=== Interior ===
Two important items of furniture in the church are the 14th-century pulpit and the Norman font. The pulpit is unique in England. Richards states it is the oldest wooden pulpit in England, and possibly in the world. It dates from the time of Edward II. It is octagonal in shape, with two of the sides forming the entrance. Five of the other six panels are carved with tracery. It is carved out of one block of wood. The font dates from the 11th century; it is not certain whether it was constructed before or after the Norman conquest. It is round and plain apart from the bowl which is carved with an incised design of figures and animals. The basin, which is lined with lead. The parish registers begin in 1629.

== External features ==
In the churchyard are the remains of an Anglo-Saxon cross and a pair of stone shafts of stocks dating probably from the 19th century. Also in the churchyard is the headstone of Thomas Brierley, who died in 1855, carved with Masonic symbols, and the war graves of two soldiers of World War I.

== See also ==
- Listed buildings in Marple, Greater Manchester
- List of churches in Greater Manchester
