= Samuel Oldknow =

English cotton manufacturer (1756–1828)

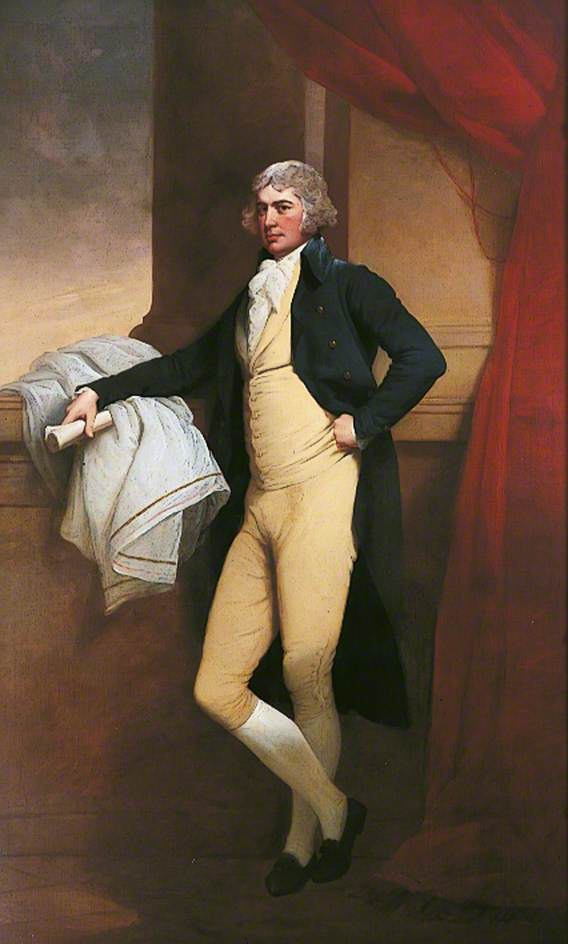
Samuel Oldknow, painting by Joseph Wright of Derby, 1790-1792

Samuel Oldknow (1756–1828) was an English cotton manufacturer.

== Early life and family ==
Samuel Oldknow Jnr, the eldest son of Samuel Oldknow Sr and Margery Foster, was born on 5 October 1756 in Anderton, near Chorley in Lancashire. He had a younger sister named Elizabeth (1758–1762 according to the grave at Rivington Unitarian Chapel), and a brother, Thomas (c.1755/56–1791 d. aged 35 according to the grave at Mellor Parish Church). Oldknow was educated at the local Rivington Grammar School and later served as an apprentice in his uncle's draper's shop in Nottingham. His family were members of the Rivington Unitarian Chapel, where his father was interred in 1759 at the age of 25. Following the death of his father, Oldknow's mother Margery continued to live with the children at Roscoe Lowe Farm, one of the properties she had inherited from her father Thomas Foster, a local yeoman. In 1770, Margery married John Clayton, a farmer, with whom she had three children: Margery, Samuel and John.

== Manufacturing business ==
Oldknow continued to have close connections to Rivington. In 1779, he purchased a number of spinning mules (also known as Hall i' th' Wood wheels, invented by Samuel Crompton of Bolton) suitable for use in the manufacture of muslin. He obtained finance of £1,000 from Abraham Crompton, Esq of Chorley Hall with whom he had both church and seemingly some family connection. By 1781, Oldknow had entered into partnership with his brother, Thomas, and he returned to live at Anderton in 1782, expanding into the manufacture of cotton goods. The Oldknow brothers' fabrics became favoured in London, where they formed a business agreement with the merchant Samuel Salte; this was the start of his rise to great success.

Oldknow used the putting-out system of production in Anderton near Rivington, whereby raw cotton was distributed to spinners and yarn to weavers who worked in their homes and workshops. The finished cloth was then returned to Oldknow's warehouse for checking and payment. This system was not suited to muslin manufacturing due to production levels and he was forced to purchase yarn from spinners who had taken advantage of mechanised production, such as Richard Arkwright.

In 1784, financed by a loan of £3,000 from Arkwright, Oldknow joined the great cotton boom in Stockport. There he purchased a house, warehouse and land on Upper Hillgate from Giles Walmsley; allowing him to increase production at lower costs. He concentrated on weaving 50-70 count muslins and calicoes using the putting out system employing up to 300 weavers. Oldknow obtained yarn from a large number and variety of small spinners; some having a single jenny at home to others who had small factories with several mules. By 1786, he had become the foremost muslin manufacturer in Britain, with 300 skilled weavers using 500 looms at Stockport and 159 weavers at Anderton. Oldknow's profits were £17,000 for each year in 1786 and 1787. Quality was an issue. In 1790, mules started to be powered from lineshafts and in the following year Oldknow established his own steam-powered spinning factory at Stockport mills at Hillgate producing 120 count. The Boulton and Watt engine was rated at 8 hp. There was a smaller factory at Carrs in Stockport; a bleaching plant at Heaton Mersey and finishing factories at Bullock Smithy and Waterside in Disley. He continued to keep warehouses at Anderton and Manchester. Spinning worked on the factory system, while weaving operated by putting out. Slowly, ancillary processes such as warping started to be done in the factory by Oldknow, and then weavers were encouraged to move their looms into the loom house before the final stage came when Oldknow provided the looms and employed the weavers on a wage.

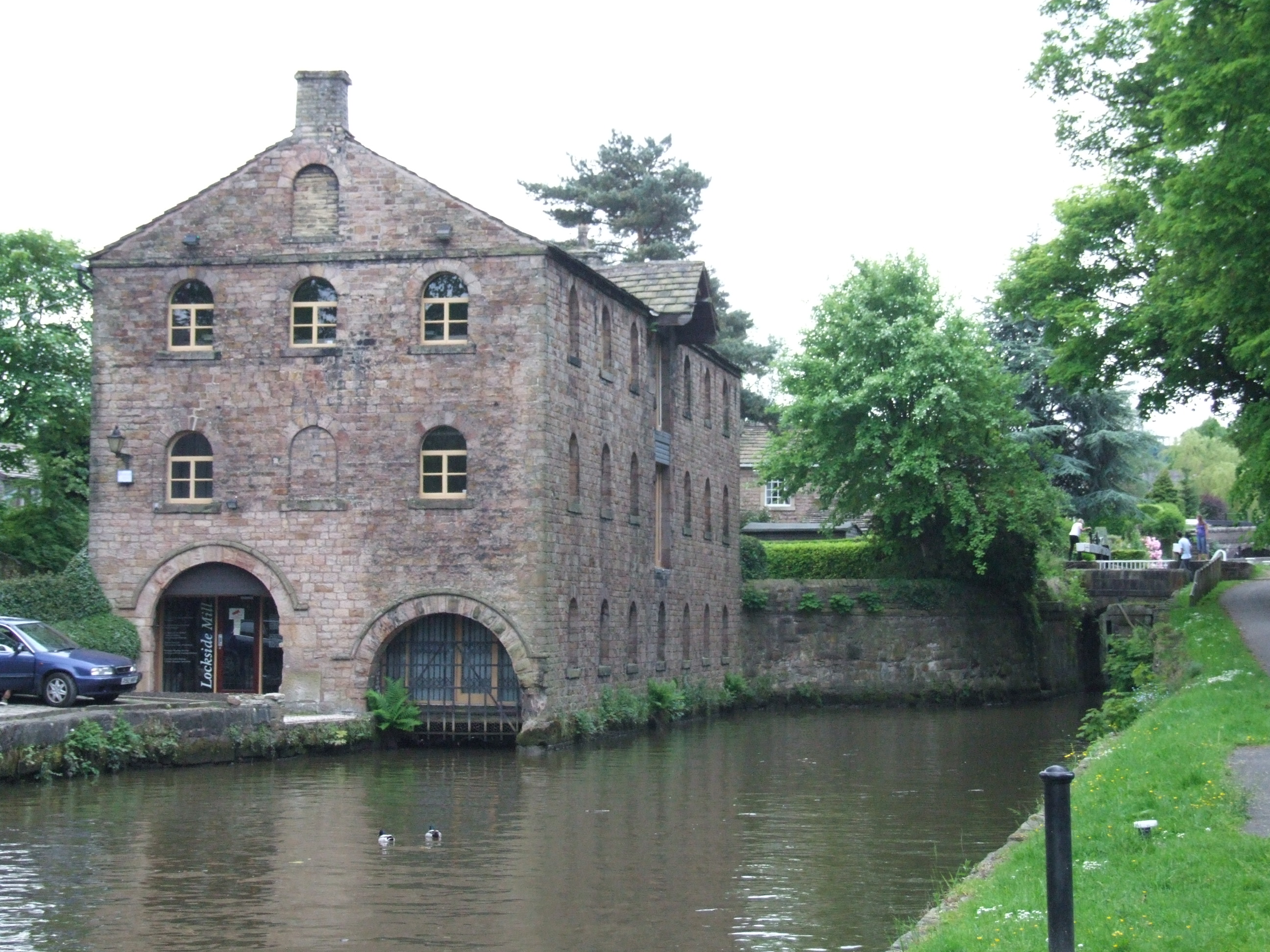
Samuel Oldknow's warehouse on the Peak Forest Canal

In 1787, Oldknow began the purchase of large areas of land at Mellor where the first mill, completed in 1790, created work for 2,000 people. This new mill used the first Boulton and Watt steam engine for turning the winding machine. Mellor Mill was a brick structure six storeys high and 400 feet (120 m) long. As part of its construction the River Goyt was diverted, three millponds were created and a system of tunnels, channels and wheelpits built. The millponds still remain and are now known as the "Roman Lakes". Some of the tunnel entrances can be seen today on the site of Oldknow's workers' garden, The Garden House Marple, which is now a charity farm, growing garden and heritage site continuing the lagacy of Oldknow.

In 1793, Oldknow opened another mill at Mellor and began actively promoting construction of the Peak Forest Canal and the Peak Forest Tramway.

Oldknow's business greatly depended on his ability to raise credit (much of which was with the Arkwright family) and it was affected when the muslin market fell, partly as a result of the outbreak of hostilities with France. This downturn resulted in Oldknow mortgaging his estates in Mellor and Marple to Richard Arkwright Junior for a loan of £11,000. Oldknow also had to sell the Heaton Mersey and Anderton operations. Although the Hillgate factory did not come into full production until 1793, Oldknow was by then in financial crisis. He was forced to lease Hillgate in 1794 and had sold it by 1801.

Oldknow shifted his operations to Mellor, where he pursued his interest in high farming as well as running a spinning factory. By the early 19th-century, the mill had over 500 employees, including a number of parish apprentices who were brought up from London.

The mill at Mellor was never particularly profitable, and Oldknow's debt grew, reaching £206,000 at the time of his death.

== Other business and investments ==
Oldknow's other business ventures included farming, coal mining and production of lime at Mellor and Marple, and he improved communications with nearby industrial centres to sell his products.

Oldknow was one of the sponsors of the Peak Forest Canal, which opened in 1804. He also invested in a turnpike road which went to Stockport. Oldknow's farming activities allowed him to supply his workers with milk, meat, vegetables and coal and he also built housing for the workforce. Oldknow used his own system of paper money to pay his workforce which could be exchanged for goods at the village shop or for cash via third parties. He was known as a good employer. One such example of this is The Garden House, developed from 1790 as an extension of the Mellor Mill complex situated on 27 acres of land to the west of Lakes Road, just down from the workers' cottages on Stone Row. The Garden House building itself was to accommodate the staff who managed the adjacent horticultural field and produce for the mill owner and workforce. Mill workers bought produce in exchange for wages. The site remains today as a thriving educational charity farm and growing garden, The Garden House Marple, with ruins of the original Garden House present and plans to rebuild and honour Oldknow's legacy in place.

Oldknow was a regular worshipper at the Church of All Saints, Marple and is credited for raising the funds for its restoration and rebuilding work which commenced in 1808 and was completed by 1811, with continued improvements to 1816. In 1826, Oldknow donated the land for the building of its vicarage.

Oldknow also served as High Sheriff of Derbyshire in 1824.

== Later years, death, and legacy ==
Oldknow never married; he was at one point in his life engaged to marry the daughter (and heiress) of Peter Drinkwater, a textile manufacturer of Manchester, who in 1794 had bought the Manor of Prestwich. The engagement was called off as his business declined.

In c.1791 the well-known artist Joseph Wright of Derby painted a portrait of Samuel Oldknow. It is now at Temple Newsam House, Leeds Museums and Galleries.

In his later years, Oldknow was engaged in his farming interests and, shortly before his death, became President of Derbyshire Agricultural Society. Oldknow died a bachelor on 18 September 1828 at Mellor Lodge, Derbyshire. His factory was mortgaged to the Arkwrights and he played a minor role in its running.

Following Oldknow's death, the factory passed to the Arkwrights. Oldknow's Factory was destroyed by fire in 1892 and although no ground level evidence still exists, there are underground parts of the old mill still present. Oldknow was buried at the Church of All Saints, Marple.

His papers remained the unique primary source made by a muslin manufacturer during the 1780s. Oldknow had a correspondence with a London-based East Indian Company sales agent, a historical archive which testifies the type and quantities of Indian textile imports and their demand in the English capital.

At least 2 landmarks in Marple are named after Oldknow: The Samuel Oldknow Pub and Oldknow Road.

== Bibliography ==
- Unwin, George (1923). Samuel Oldknow and the Arkwrights: The Industrial Revolution at Stockport and Marple. Hulme, Taylor, Chaloner (2nd edition, June 1967 ed.). Manchester: Manchester University Press.

Honorary titles
Preceded by Thomas Bateman	High Sheriff of Derbyshire; 1824	Succeeded by Sir Charles Abney-Hastings, Bt
