= Leighton Hospital =

Hospital in Cheshire, England

- Mid Cheshire Hospitals NHS Foundation trust
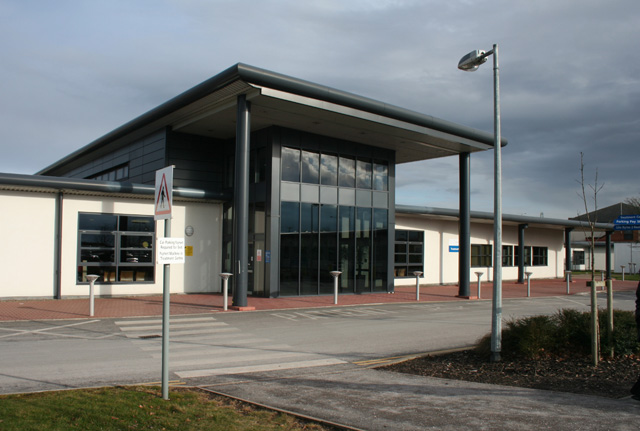
- Reception at the treatment centre at Leighton Hospital

- Location within Cheshire

Geography
- Location: Crewe, Cheshire, England
- Coordinates: 53.1199°N 2.4778°W

Services
- Beds: 540

History
- Founded: May 1972

Links
- Website: www.mchft.nhs.uk/about-us/our-sites/leighton-hospital/
- Lists: Hospitals in England

Leighton Hospital is a 540-bed hospital located to the northwest of the town of Crewe in the county of Cheshire, England. Managed by the Mid Cheshire Hospitals NHS Foundation Trust, it opened in 1972, but the original building will be replaced by a 'super hospital' to be constructed between 2027 and 2032.

== History ==
Built at a cost of £6 million, Leighton Hospital was officially opened by Queen Elizabeth II in May 1972. It replaced older facilities at Crewe District Memorial Hospital, Crewe Works Hospital (built by the London and North Western Railway Company), the Linden Grange Maternity Hospital and Coppenhall Hospital in Crewe, and Nantwich Cottage Hospital and the Barony Hospital in Nantwich.

In June 2018 the hospital was recognised with a national award for patient experience.

An inspection in November 2019 resulted in the hospital being rated "good" overall, and "requires improvement" in the "safe" category by the Care Quality Commission.

=== Redevelopment ===
The Guardian newspaper noted that a 2020 proposal to rebuild Leighton Hospital was not funded by HM Treasury during Rishi Sunak's term as Chancellor of the Exchequer, despite a "catastrophic" grade of risk and a warning that an incident was "likely". In September 2021, a bid was submitted to the Department of Health and Social Care to fund a £663 million redevelopment of the hospital. Materials used in its original construction, particularly reinforced autoclaved aerated concrete (RAAC) panels in the roof and walls, had resulted in significant spending to resolve safety risks. A new build was estimated to be around £100 million cheaper than the continued refurbishment. In February 2023, Leighton Hospital was reported to be at risk of 'collapsing without warning' due to the use of RAAC planks across more than 60% of its site footprint. The planks' lifespan was 30 years, but the hospital was now over 50 years old. On 25 May 2023 it was confirmed that the hospital would be rebuilt.

In May 2024, consultant Gleeds was appointed as project manager for the redevelopment, then valued at over £700m. Neighbouring plots of land totalling 24 acres (9.7 ha) had been purchased to enable construction of the new hospital campus. In June 2026, planning consent was given for the £1.3bn redevelopment of the hospital, with the existing complex replaced by a 1.2m sq ft 'super hospital' built largely to the north of the existing site. McAlpine/Vinci's Integrated Health Projects joint venture was contracted to build the six-storey main hospital building and other facilities, while four existing buildings will be retained and repurposed. Construction should start in 2027, with completion expected in 2032.

== See also ==
- List of hospitals in England
- 2023 United Kingdom reinforced autoclaved aerated concrete crisis
