= Macclesfield District General Hospital =

- East Cheshire NHS Trust
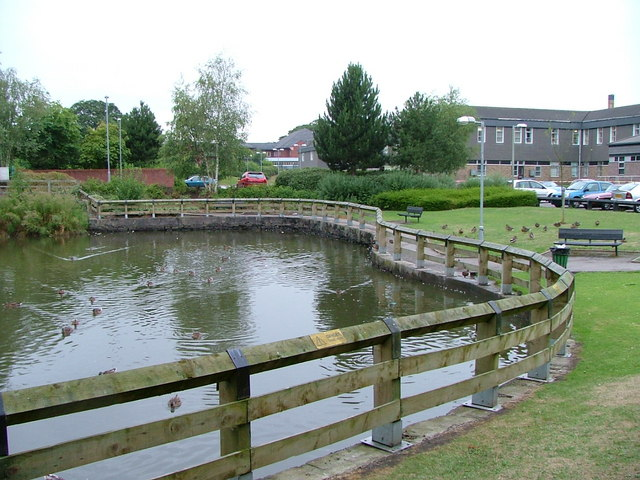
- Macclesfield District General Hospital

- Shown in Cheshire

Geography
- Location: Macclesfield, Cheshire, England
- Coordinates: 53.2624°N 2.1419°W

Organisation
- Care system: NHS
- Type: General

Services
- Emergency department: Yes
- Beds: 323

History
- Founded: 1844

Links
- Website: www.eastcheshire.nhs.uk
- Lists: Hospitals in England

Macclesfield District General Hospital is a health facility in Macclesfield, Cheshire. It is managed by the East Cheshire NHS Trust.

== History ==
The hospital has its origins in the Macclesfield Workhouse and Hospital which opened at West Park in 1844. A fever hospital was completed in 1854 and a new hospital block was completed in 1881. It became West Park Hospital in 1930 and joined the National Health Service as Macclesfield Hospital, West Park Branch in 1948.

Meanwhile the Macclesfield Infirmary, which had been built at Cumberland Street in 1868, evolved to join the National Health Service as Macclesfield Hospital, Infirmary Branch in 1948. The Infirmary Branch moved to Prestbury Road in 1980.

The operation of the hospital became very inefficient as clinical operations were split between the West Park Branch and the Infirmary Branch. Accordingly the hospital was re-built as Macclesfield District General Hospital at West Park in the early 1980s.

The sustainability and transformation plan for Merseyside and Cheshire proposed to downgrade the emergency department at Macclesfield District General Hospital to a minor injuries and illnesses unit, but within a fortnight, after widespread opposition it was altered to read "The clear view is that the best model of care will include an A&E department at Macclesfield staffed by hospital doctors and clinicians."

At the start of the COVID-19 pandemic in England the maternity services were closed and staff and patients sent to acute sites in Greater Manchester.
