= East Cheshire NHS Trust =

English NHS Trust

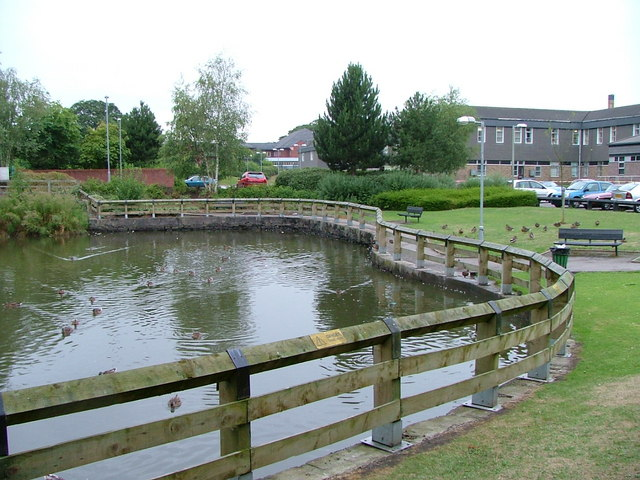
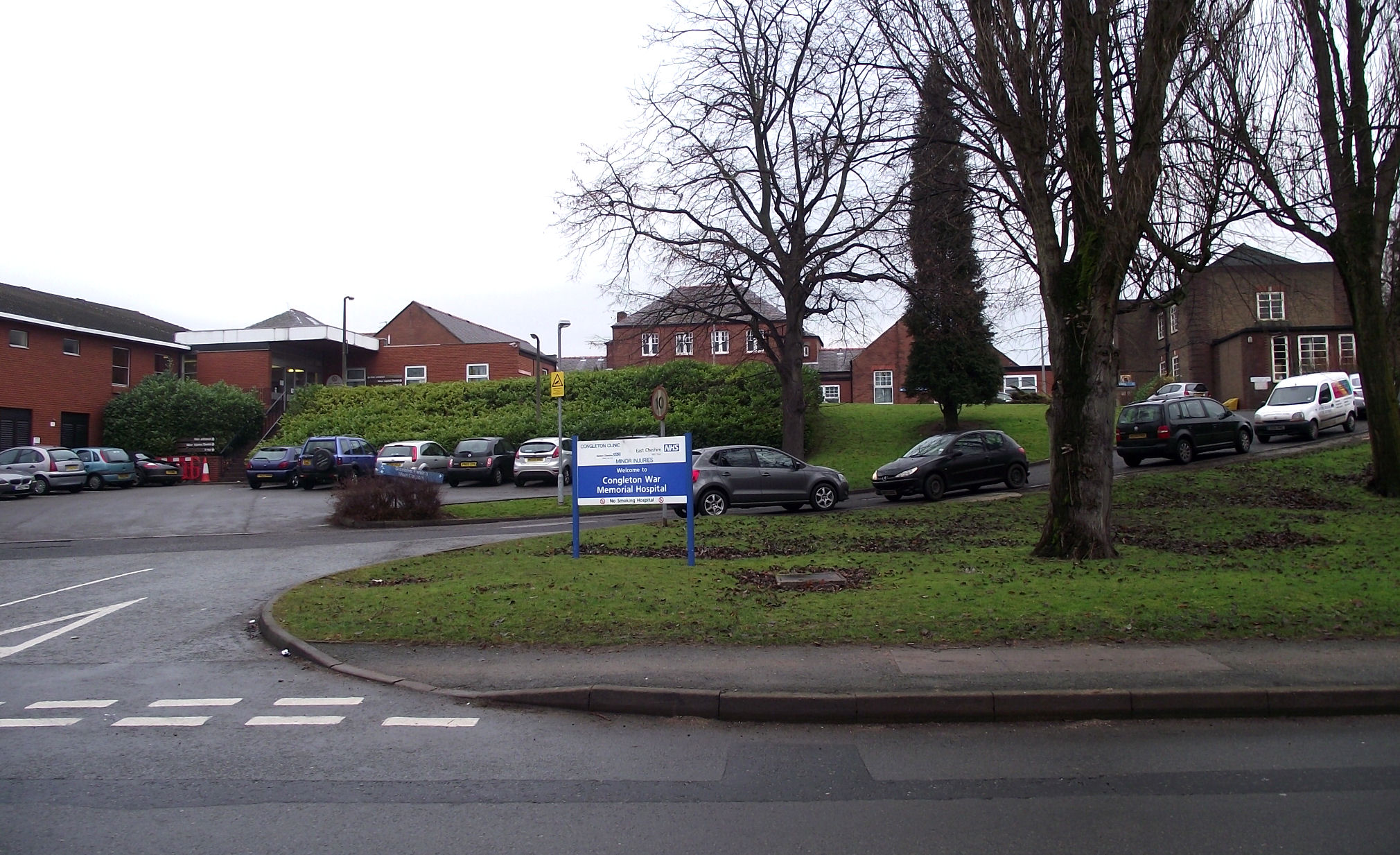
- Macclesfield District General Hospital Congleton War Memorial Hospital
- Type: NHS hospital trust
- Established: 4 November 1992
- Headquarters: Victoria Road, Macclesfield, SK10 3BL
- Region served: East Cheshire
- Population: >250,000
- Hospitals: Macclesfield District General Hospital; Congleton War Memorial Hospital; Knutsford & District Community Hospital
- Chair: Aislinn O'Dwyer
- Chief executive: Dr John Hunter
- Staff: 3,201
- Website: www.eastcheshire.nhs.uk

East Cheshire NHS Trust is a NHS trust in Cheshire which runs Macclesfield District General Hospital (323 beds), Congleton War Memorial Hospital (28 beds), and Knutsford & District Community Hospital. With services commissioned by NHS Cheshire and Merseyside.

It provides both acute hospital services and community services, with the CQC in March 2026, announcing the result of a inspection undertaken from July to September 2025, rating the trust as "requires improvement" in the key question of "well led".

In 2024/25 105,079 outpatients were seen, 267,690 community visits were provided, and 11,231 patients were treated by the trust.

== History ==
The Trust was established in November 1992, becoming operational in April 1993.

In April 2012, it made an unsuccessful bid to become an NHS foundation trust.

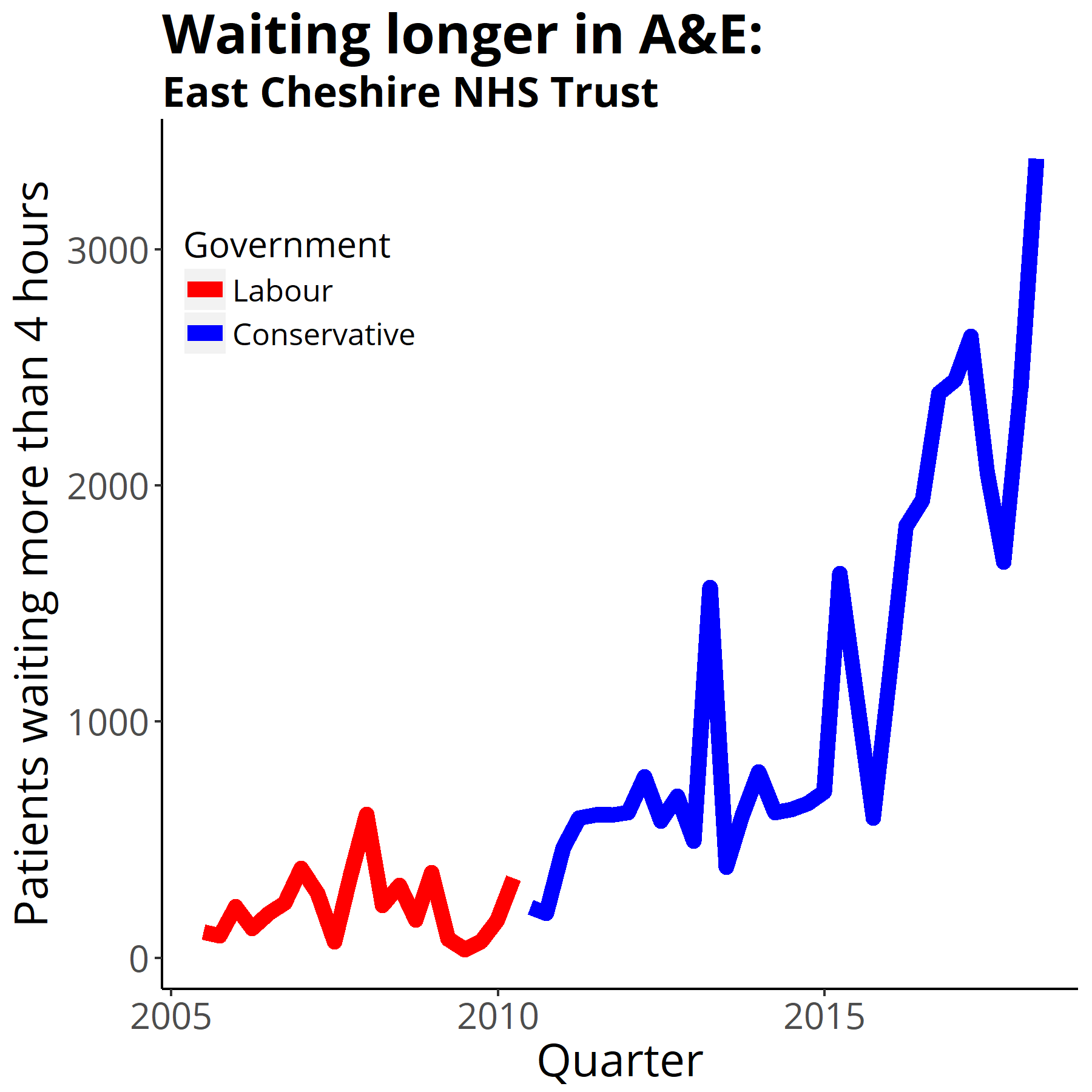
Four-hour target in the emergency department quarterly figures from NHS England Data from https://www.england.nhs.uk/statistics/statistical-work-areas/ae-waiting-times-and-activity/

The Casualty Department in Macclesfield has been under threat for some years, but in August 2013 it was said to be under no immediate threat.

The Trust had a contract with Arvato services for human resource services. 60 of the trust's staff were transferred to Arvato in 2013. In May 2016 Arvato said the contract was no longer commercially viable, demanding £2.4 million a year (more than double the contract price of £1.1 million a year) to continue after the end of the contractual period in April 2017. The contract was brought back in-house.

The Trust gained a contract for sexual health services when Cheshire West and Chester Council decided to transfer it from Countess of Chester Hospital NHS Foundation Trust in December 2014.

It spent £1.7 million on agency staff in 2014/5. In February 2016 it was expecting a deficit of £18.3 million for the year 2015/6.

In July 2016 the board announced that it no longer believed the organisation is sustainable in its current form, forecasting a deficit in 2016/7 of £20m.

In December 2016, New Alderley House was acquired by PHP for £10.1m, and was let out to East Cheshire NHS Trust for 16 years. New Alderley House is used by the trust for outpatient appointments and an education / training center.

The sustainability and transformation plan for Merseyside and Cheshire proposed to downgrade the emergency department at Macclesfield District General Hospital to a minor injuries and illnesses unit, but within a fortnight, after widespread opposition it was altered to read "The clear view is that the best model of care will include an A&E department at Macclesfield staffed by hospital doctors and clinicians."

As of March 2020, 250,000 - 270,000 medical records were held on site, alongside medical, financial, administrative and corporate records stored offsite within 56,670 boxes at Deepstore inside the winsford salt works.

A Same Day Emergency Care unit opened August of 2021 at Macclesfield District General Hospital. The unit is used for the assessment, diagnosis and treatment of patients with acute medical conditions referred by their GP, NHS 111, A&E or the ambulance service. The construction of the unit containing a waiting area and 6 consultation rooms cost the Trust £2.2 million.

An expansion of the endoscopy unit and radiology department at Macclesfield District General Hospital opened in January 2024, with an additional two endoscopy treatment rooms, and an additional MRI suite, spread across two floors.

In April 2024 the trust extended its contract with ISS for facility management services for five more years, with an option to extend the contract by two years, with a lifetime value of £33 million.

As of 14 June 2025, the trust has transitioned to a joint electronic patient record system with Mid Cheshire Hospitals NHS Foundation Trust, using Meditech's Expanse. The Digital Clinical System was planned since 2022, and was going to be released in 2024.

In December 2025 a refurbished Discharge lounge opened at, Macclesfield District General Hospital. With a waiting area, 3 private rooms, a shower room, and a separate toilet, the construction was funded by a successful national NHS bid to improve urgent and emergency care services.

At Congleton War Memorial Hospital, a £5 million Community Diagnostic Centre opened January 2026, providing a walk in X-ray service, non-obstetric ultrasounds, ECGs, and echocardiograms.

At Macclesfield District General Hospital (MDGH) a 8 bed 4 chair Acute Medical Receiving Unit (AMRU) opened in June 2026, funded by capital investment with the aim to reduce pressures on MDGH's A&E department. At present the unit is accepting admissions between 8am - 8pm but plans to allow admissions 24/7 in the future. MDGH's AMRU accepts patients via referrals from its own A&E department and from the 6th of July 2026 from General Practitioners in the region, the North West Ambulance Service or community health professionals.

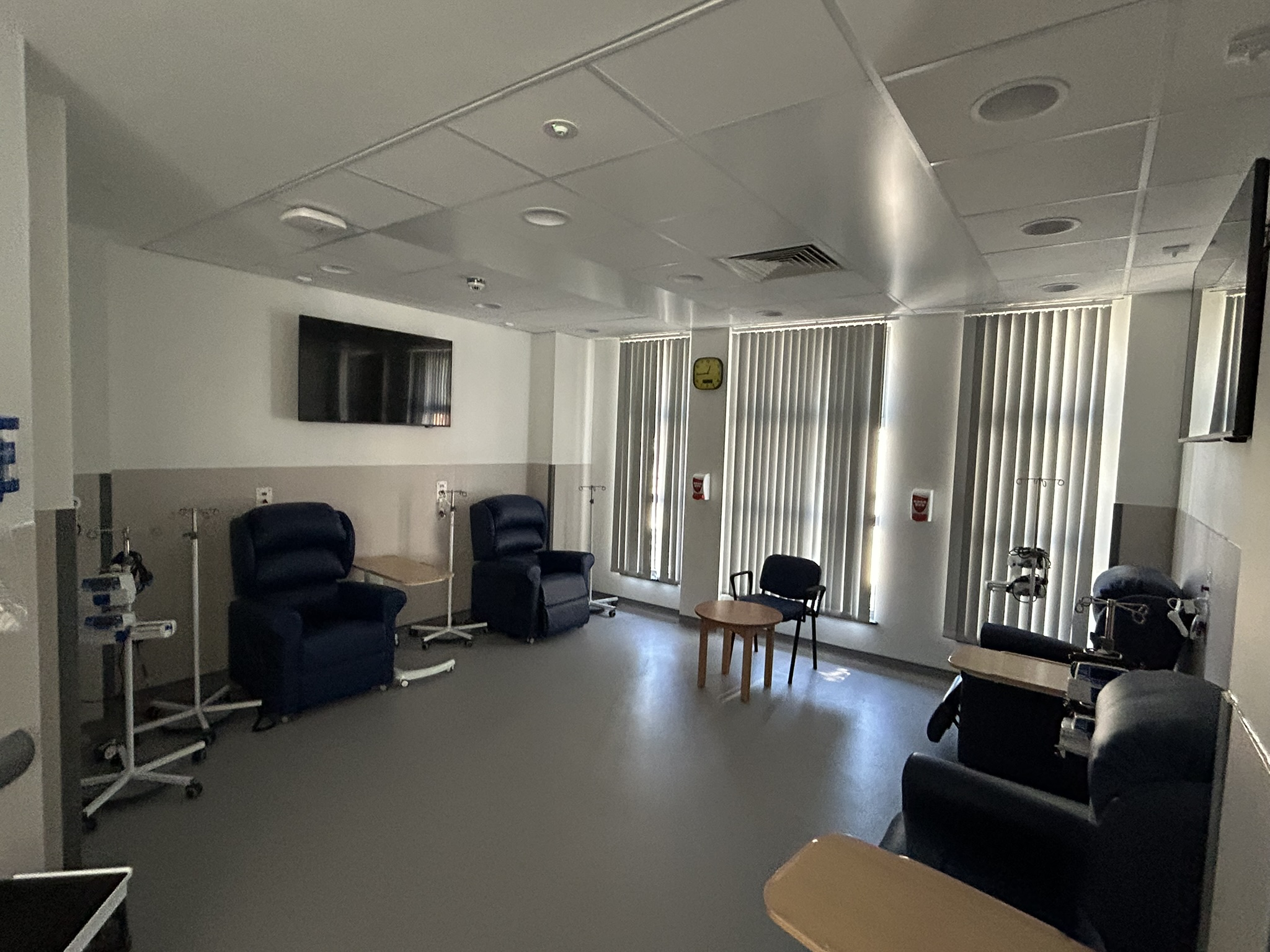
AMRU Chairs

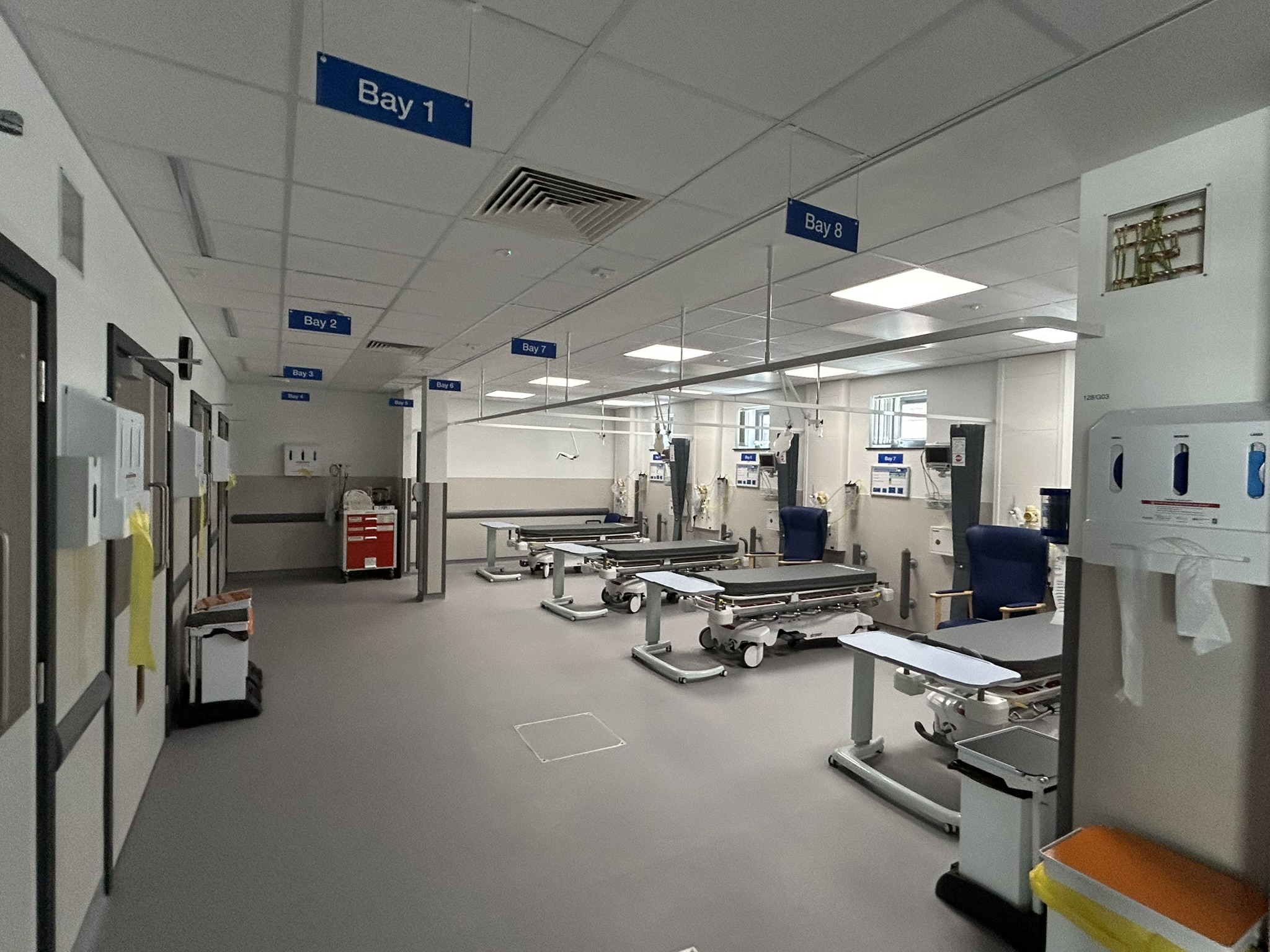
AMRU Beds

== Annual Report And Accounts 24/25 ==
=== Performance ===
Metric	Target	2024/25
Mortality
Summary Hospital Mortality Indicator (HSCIC) (Nov 2023 – Oct 2024)	To be within the expected range	1.2
Infection
E. coli – hospital	< 27	33
Hospital MRSA bacteraemia	0	2
Hospital Acquired Clostridioides Difficile	≤ 10	5 avoidable 23 unavoidable
Incidents
Newly acquired cat 3 pressure ulcers – hospital	55	87
Newly acquired cat 4 pressure ulcers – hospital	0	8
Newly acquired cat 3 pressure ulcers – community	71	134
Newly acquired cat 4 pressure ulcers – community	0	9
Medication errors causing serious harm	0	2
Never Events	0	0
Falls resulting in patient harm - per 1000 occupied beds	< 1.17	0.2
Complaints
Number of complaints with HSO Recommendations	0	0
Experience
Ward Family and Friends Test % response	> 90%	94.1%
Emergency Department Family and Friends Test % response	> 85%	77.9%
Single Sex Accommodation breaches	0	0
Access
18 week – Incomplete patients (March 2025)	≥ 92%	77%
Diagnostic six week wait	≥ 99%	90%
Emergency Department 4hr target	≥ 78.5%	51.9%
Cancer Services
31 day standard wait	≥ 96%	98.9%
62 day standard wait	≥ 86%	70.2%
Faster diagnosis standard	≥ 75%	76%
Criteria to Reside
No patients eligible to reside	≥ 90%	81.1%
Staff
Core Staff in Post (FTE) (March 2025)	2386.29	2366.54
Statutory and Mandatory Training (Medical & non-medical)	≥ 85%	80%

=== Accounts ===
Item	2024/25 (£)	2023/24 (£)	% Change From Previous Year
Total Income	236,988,000	217,066,000	+9.18%
Total Expenses	-243,841,000	-227,243,000	+7.30%
Deficit for the year	-6,853,000	-10,117,000	-32.26%

== See also ==
- List of hospitals in England
- List of NHS trusts
