= Healthcare in Cheshire =

Healthcare in Cheshire was the responsibility of Eastern Cheshire, South Cheshire, Vale Royal, and West Cheshire clinical commissioning groups until July 2022.

The Cheshire Care Record, an electronic health record, was implemented in 2016, across acute, primary, council, community, mental health and cancer data with a total 44 million clinical records, but needed further finance for its development.

== History ==
From 1947 to 1974, most NHS services in Cheshire were managed by the Manchester Regional Hospital Board, apart from those in part of Chester (borough of Bebington); the urban districts of Ellesmere Port, Hoylake, Hoole, Lymm, Neston, Runcorn, and Wirral; and the rural districts of Chester, Runcorn and Tarvin which were managed from Liverpool. In 1974, the boards were abolished and replaced by regional health authorities. All of Cheshire came under the Mersey RHA. Regions were reorganised in 1996 and Cheshire came under the North West Regional Health Authority. Cheshire from 1974 had an area health authority, divided into six districts: Chester, Crewe, Halton, Macclesfield, Warrington and Wirral. The area health authorities took over responsibility for many of the health services previously managed by local authorities including vaccination, health centres, family planning, school health, health visiting, and home nursing. In 1993 four new district health authorities were established covering Central and Eastern Cheshire, Warrington, Western Cheshire, Birkenhead and Wallasey, and Bebington and West Wirral. In 2006, the last two were merged into Wirral Primary Care Trust. They were managed by the Cheshire and Merseyside Strategic Health Authority until 2006 and then by the North West SHA from 2002 to 2013.

== Commissioning ==
The clinical commissioning groups for West Cheshire, South Cheshire, Vale Royal, and Eastern Cheshire agreed to establish a unified health commissioner in April 2017. This may lead to a merger of the organizations. In November 2018, they appointed a single accountable officer and planned to merge completely in April 2020.

== Sustainability and transformation plans ==
Cheshire is part of the Merseyside and Cheshire sustainability and transformation plan area, which faced £909m cuts in 2020. Four accountable care organizations are proposed for Cheshire and the Wirral, and some services would be moved from Macclesfield to Stockport. The plans envisage a total of £755 million in capital funding, but it is not clear where this might come from.

== Primary and community care ==
There are 22 general practices in Eastern Cheshire, 39 in West Cheshire, 18 in South Cheshire, and 12 in Vale Royal. According to the WhatClinic website, there are 229 Private General Practices in Cheshire, but the vast majority of those which are not NHS GP services offer only chiropody, physiotherapy or sports injury services.

Out-of-hours services are provided by East Cheshire NHS Trust and the Western Cheshire GP Out of Hours Service. Community care is provided by Bridgewater Community Healthcare NHS Foundation Trust and Cheshire and Wirral Partnership NHS Foundation Trust.

The practices in east Cheshire started a campaign for fairer funding in 2017, asking all residents to write to their prospective parliamentary candidates. They claim that NHS funding does not take age into account and that patients in the area are on average older and more in need of healthcare.

== Mental health ==
Cheshire and Wirral Partnership NHS Foundation Trust and Mersey Care NHS Foundation Trust are the main NHS providers. A document seen by The Guardian in 2017 maintained that there are plans to cut costs over mental health care which could harm patients. If these plans were acted on there was concern psychiatric patients would get expensive but inappropriate care in A&E instead of more suitable care in specialist mental health facilities.

== Hospital and acute care ==
Clatterbridge Cancer Centre NHS Foundation Trust, East Cheshire NHS Trust, Countess of Chester Hospital NHS Foundation Trust, Mid Cheshire Hospitals NHS Foundation Trust, and Warrington and Halton Teaching Hospitals NHS Foundation Trust are all located in the county. Specialized hospital services are provided by NHS trusts in Stoke-on-Trent, Liverpool, and Manchester. According to a document seen by Guardian reporters in 2017, endoscopies were to be reduced by 25% among other cost-cutting measures. Cost-cutting proposals in Cheshire could delay the start of treatment for cancer patients and lead to them dying sooner.

West Midlands Ambulance Service had a five-year patient transport contract for Cheshire, Wirral, and Warrington, at a cost of £25 million from 2016 but decided to hand it back in May 2018 because centralization of secondary care services meant that it was not sustainable due to longer journeys.
