= Mid Cheshire Hospitals NHS Foundation Trust =

- Type: NHS hospital trust
- Hospitals: Leighton Hospital
- Chair: Dennis Dunn
- Chief executive: Ian Moston
- Staff: c.3,500
- Website: www.mcht.nhs.uk

Mid Cheshire Hospitals NHS Foundation Trust (MCHFT) is an acute hospital trust in Cheshire. It runs Leighton Hospital in Crewe, Victoria Infirmary in Northwich, and Elmhurst Intermediate Care Centre in Winsford. MCHFT was established as an NHS Trust in April 1991, and became an NHS Foundation Trust in April 2008. The trust is currently led by Chair of the Board of Directors Dennis Dunn and CEO Ian Moston.

Registered with the Care Quality Commission (CQC), the Trust provides acute, maternity, child health and intermediate care services to a population of approximately 300,000 living in and around Alsager, Crewe, Congleton, Knutsford, Middlewich, Nantwich, Northwich, Sandbach, and Winsford.

== Performance ==
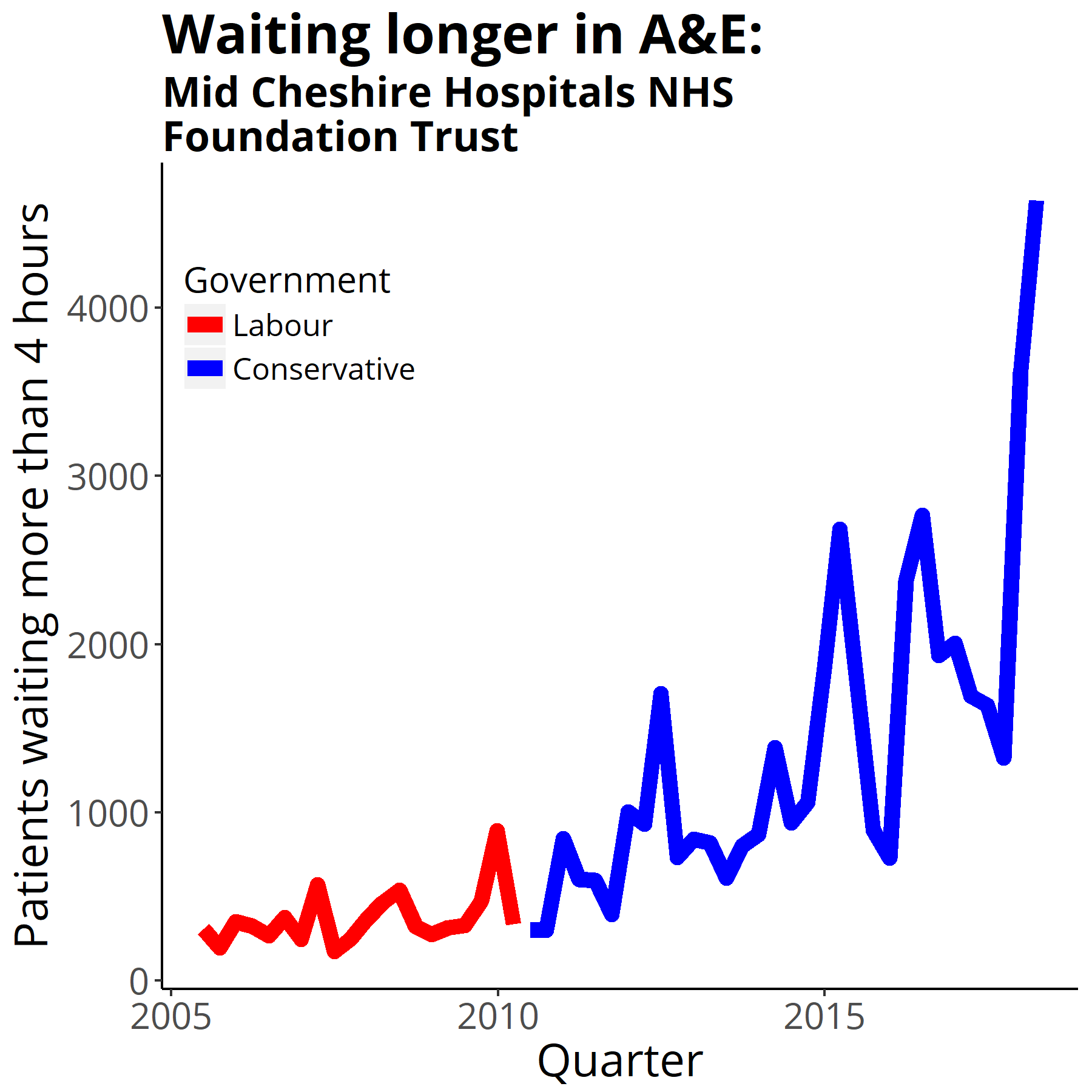
Four-hour target in the emergency department quarterly figures from NHS England Data from https://www.england.nhs.uk/statistics/statistical-work-areas/ae-waiting-times-and-activity/

The CQC made a comprehensive inspection of the Trust and its three sites in October 2014. Its report, published in January 2015, gave the Trust an overall "good" rating.

Leighton Hospital Maternity Services received the Mothercare Award for Midwifery Service of the Year from the Royal College of Midwives in 2015. That same year it also achieved full accreditation from UNICEF's Baby Friendly Initiative and Level 3 status (the highest available) from the Clinical Negligence Scheme for Trusts.

In 2012, CHKS awarded the Trust its 'Most Improved Trust in the Country' award, recognising progress made by its staff and services. In May 2014, the Trust was named as one of the best in the country for the third year in a row in the CHKS 40Top Hospitals award.

In the early 2010s the Trust had "higher than expected" mortality rates, and work took place to identify and address the causes. When the Health and Social Care Information Centre published its mortality data in July 2014, the Trust had returned to the "as expected" range. The Trust also uses the Risk Adjusted Mortality Index (RAMI), and worked to make consistent improvement in this area; the RAMI figures covering the twelve months to July 2014 suggested the Trust was performing better than the national average.

In 2015, the Health Service Journal named the Trust as one of the top hundred NHS trusts to work for. At that time, 66% of its 3,003 full time equivalent staff recommended it as a place to work.

== Facilities ==
Spring 2014 saw the first patients treated in the new Theatre suite at Leighton Hospital. Part of the £22.8million project which also saw the creation of a new Critical Care unit, the new Theatres offer opportunities to further develop existing ways of working in a way that will maximise the benefits of new theatre designs such as barn theatres and integrated theatres.

In 2018 the trust applied for £1.4 million in capital funding from NHS Improvement to fund a portable ward next to the A&E department, which is overcrowded, but funding was refused when the trust said this would not lead to a 50% reduction in breaches of the Four Hour Emergency Target over winter.

In 2022 the outstanding maintenance bill was £280 million, the sixth largest in the English NHS.

It is planning a joint electronic patient record system with East Cheshire NHS Trust using Meditech's Expanse, which is cloud based and should operate from 2024.

== Relationship with private sector ==
The Trust uses BMI Healthcare's South Cheshire Hospital to help with elective surgery capacity problems, usually in the winter. The two buildings are connected by a covered corridor. It was announced in February 2019 that the Trust planned to acquire the 32-bed hospital, which stands adjacent to Leighton Hospital, near Crewe.

== See also ==
- List of hospitals in England
- List of NHS trusts
