= NHS Cheshire and Merseyside =

- Type: Integrated Care Board
- Established: 1 July 2022
- Headquarters: No 1 Lakeside, 920 Centre Park Square, Warrington, WA1 1QY
- Region served: Cheshire and Merseyside
- Population: 2.7 million
- Chair: Sir David Henshaw
- Chief executive: Dr Liz Bishop
- Website: www.cheshireandmerseyside.nhs.uk

NHS Cheshire and Merseyside is a Integrated Care Board which commissions care for NHS services in the Cheshire and Merseyside area. It currently pays for services for over 2.7 million people, living in Cheshire East, Cheshire West, Halton, Knowsley, Liverpool, Sefton, St Helens, Warrington and the Wirral.

== History ==
NHS Cheshire and Merseyside was formed on the 1st of July 2022, following the implementation of the Health and Care Act 2022, abolishing the 9 previous Clinical Commissioning Groups, absorbing 1,200 staff members.
