= Cheshire inventions, innovations and firsts =

Inventions, innovations and firsts made in the county of Cheshire, in North West England.

== Inventions and discoveries ==
Polythene — invented in 1933, at ICI in Northwich.

Pulsation Engine — a precursor to the hydraulic ram, invented by John Whitehurst in Oulton Park.

First observation of extragalactic radio source — the Andromeda nebula (M31) made at Jodrell Bank in 1950

== Innovations and firsts ==
Cheshire Cheese — there are conflicting accounts of Cheshire Cheese being mentioned in the Domesday Book, and so the first county cheese, or, along with Shropshire Cheese, recorded much later in 1580.

UK's first Neighbourhood Watch

First known stagecoach ran between Birmingham and Holywell via Nantwich and Chester, 1637.

First dementia-friendly checkout — Tesco supermarket in Chester claimed to be the "First known supermarket to implement a dementia-friendly checkout."
