= Cheshire =

County of England

- Ceremonial county
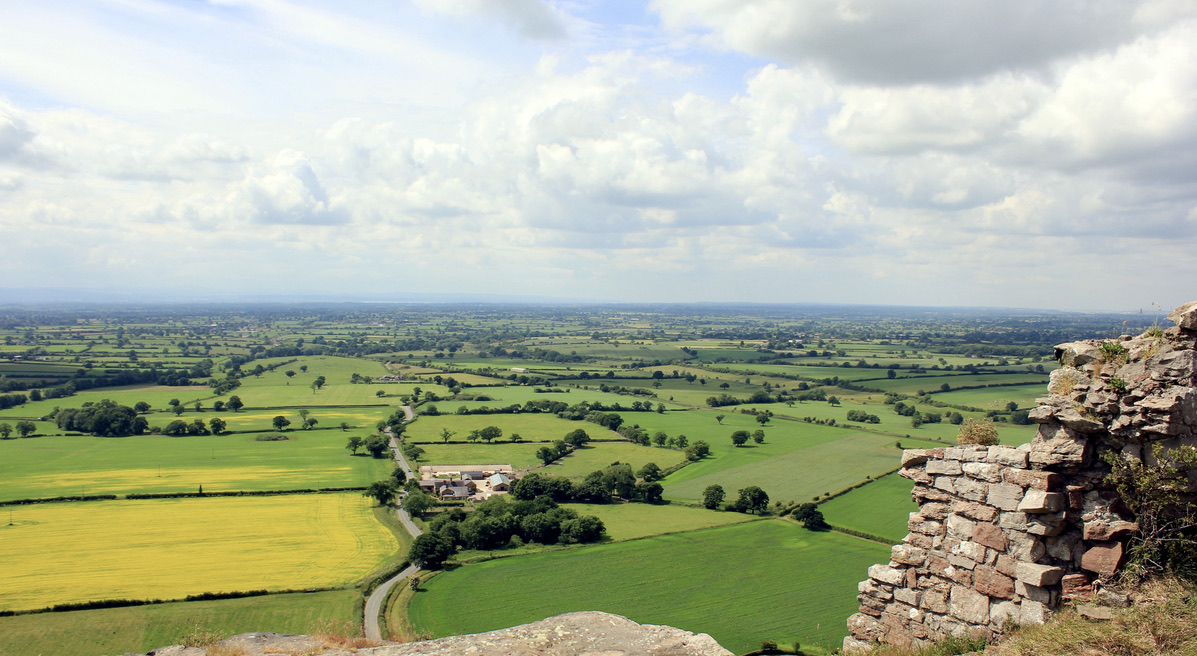
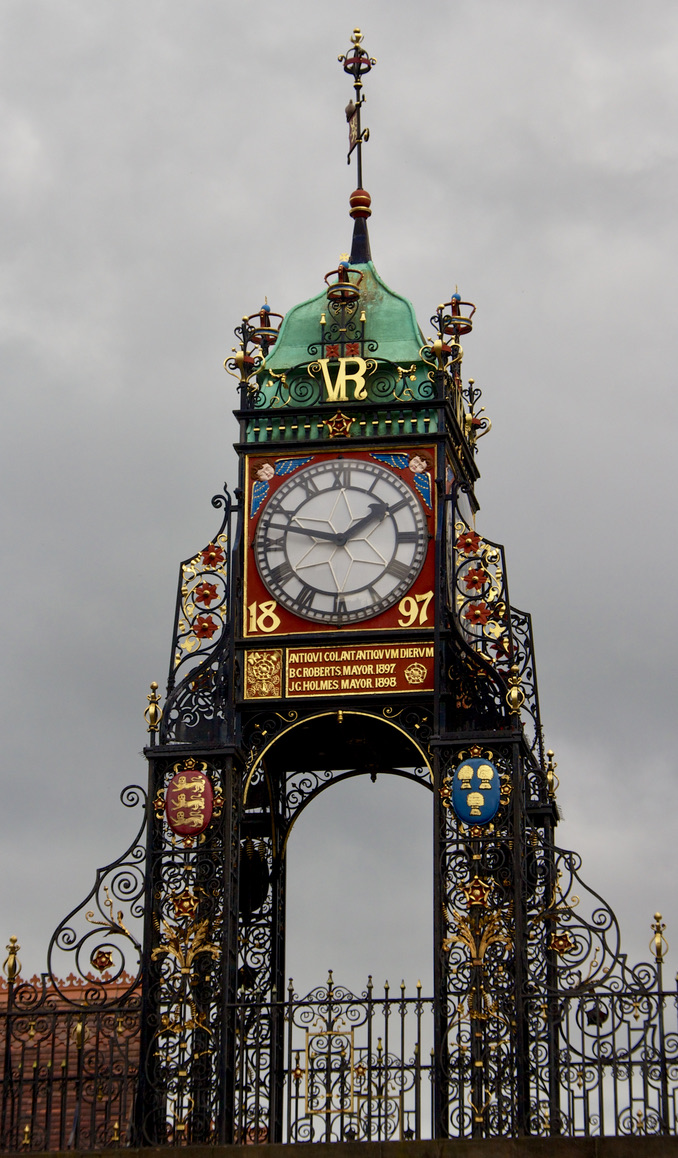
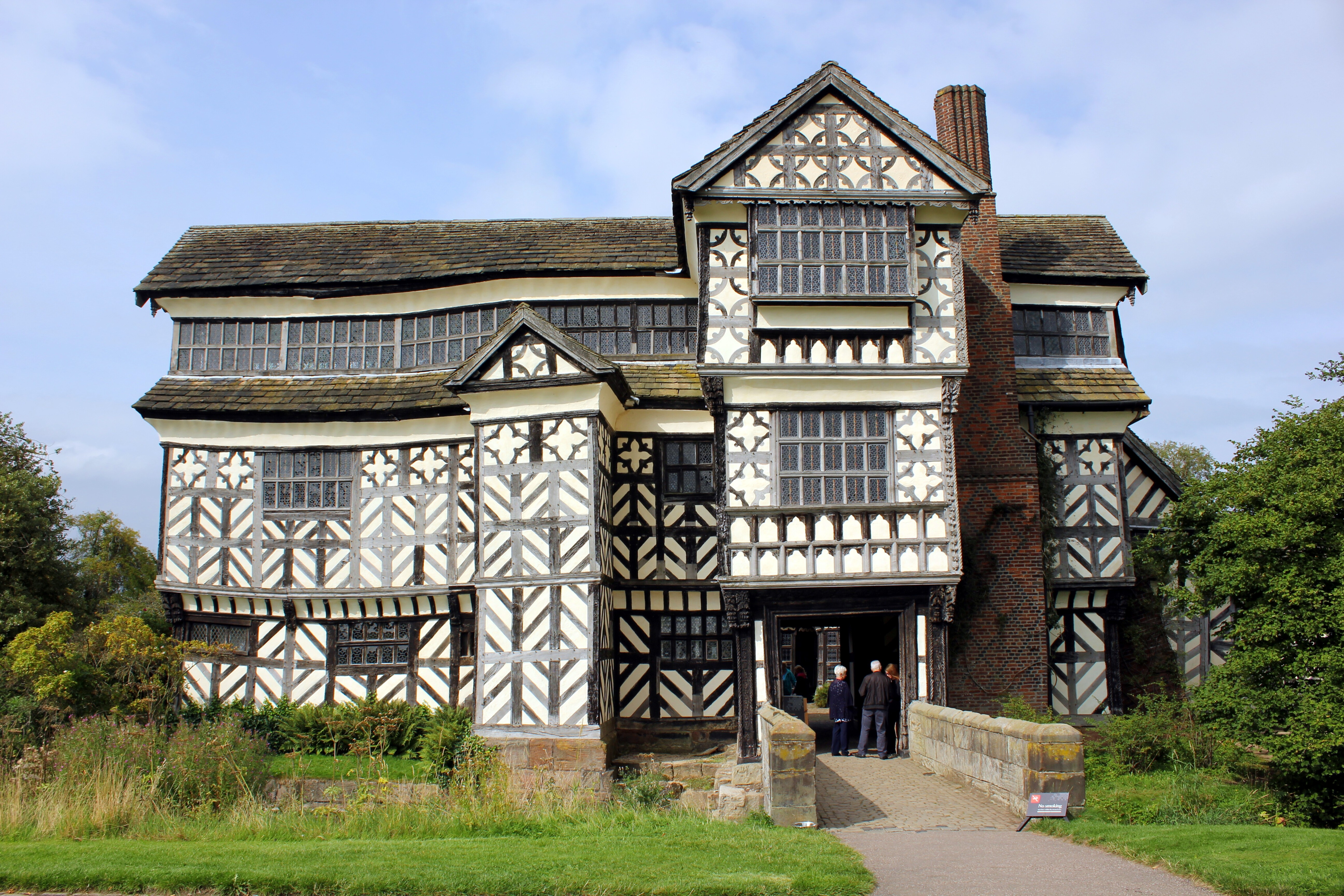
- The Cheshire Plain from Beeston Castle, Eastgate Clock in Chester, and Little Moreton Hall

- Cheshire shown within England
- Coordinates: 53°10′N 2°35′W
- Sovereign state: United Kingdom
- Constituent country: England
- Region: North West
- Established: Ancient
- Time zone: UTC+0 (GMT)
  - Summer (DST): UTC+1 (BST)
- UK Parliament: 12 MPs
- Police: Cheshire Constabulary
- Ceremonial county
- Lord Lieutenant: Alexis, Lady Redmond
- High Sheriff: Lynn Karen Pegler
- Area: 2,346 km^{2} (906 sq mi)
  - Rank: 25th of 48
- Population (2024): 1,139,884
  - Rank: 18th of 48
  - Density: 486/km^{2} (1,260/sq mi)
- Districts
- Districts of Cheshire; Unitary
- Districts: 1. Cheshire West and Chester; 2. Cheshire East; 3. Warrington; 4. Halton

Cheshire (/ˈtʃɛʃər, -ɪər/ CHESH-ər, -eer) is a ceremonial county in North West England. It is bordered by Merseyside to the north-west, Greater Manchester to the north-east, Derbyshire to the east, Staffordshire to the south-east, and Shropshire to the south; to the west it is bordered by the Welsh counties of Flintshire and Wrexham, and has a short coastline on the Dee Estuary. The largest settlement is Warrington.

The county has an area of 905 square miles (2,344 km^{2}) and had a population of 1,139,884 in 2024. The areas around the River Mersey in the north of the county are the most densely populated, with Warrington, Runcorn, Widnes, and Ellesmere Port located on the river. The city of Chester lies in the west of the county, Crewe in the south, and Macclesfield in the east. For local government purposes Cheshire comprises four unitary authority areas: Cheshire East, Cheshire West and Chester, Halton, and Warrington. Halton Borough Council is a member of the Liverpool City Region Combined Authority, and the councils of the other three areas collaborate through the Cheshire and Warrington Combined Authority. The county historically included all of the Wirral Peninsula and parts of southern Greater Manchester and northern Derbyshire, but excluded Widnes and Warrington.

The landscape of the county is dominated by the Cheshire Plain, an area of relatively flat land divided by the Mid-Cheshire Ridge. To the west, Cheshire contains the south of the Wirral Peninsula, and to the east the landscape rises to the Pennines, where the county contains part of the Peak District. The River Mersey runs through the north of Cheshire before broadening into its wide estuary; the River Dee forms part of the county's border with Wales, then fully enters England and flows through Chester before re-entering Wales upstream of its estuary. Red Triassic sandstone forms the bedrock of much of the county, and was used in the construction of many of its buildings.

== Toponymy ==
Cheshire's name was originally derived from an early name for Chester, and was first recorded as Legeceasterscir in the Anglo-Saxon Chronicle, meaning "the shire of the city of legions". Although the name first appears in 980, it is thought that the county was created by Edward the Elder around 920. In the Domesday Book, Cheshire was recorded as having the name Cestrescir (Chestershire), derived from the name for Chester at the time. Through the next few centuries a series of changes that occurred in the English language, which have included simplifications and elision, has resulted in the name Cheshire.

Because of the historically close links with the land bordering Cheshire to the west, which became modern Wales, there is a history of interaction between Cheshire and North Wales. The Domesday Book records Cheshire as having two complete Hundreds (Atiscross and Exestan) that later became the principal part of Flintshire. Additionally, another large portion of the Duddestan Hundred later became known as English Maelor (Maelor Saesneg) when it was transferred to North Wales. For this and other reasons, the Welsh language name for Cheshire, Swydd Gaerlleon, is sometimes used.

== History ==
=== Earldom ===
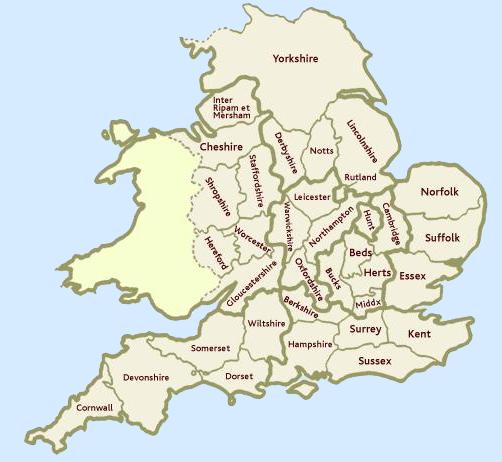
The counties of England following the Norman Conquest. Cheshire held a strategic position on the Welsh border with the hundreds between the rivers Mersey and Ribble (Inter Ripam et Mersam) to the north.

The strategic location of the Earldom of Chester; the only county palatine on the Welsh Marches. Pura Wallia (independent Wales) Lands gained by Llywelyn the Great in 1234 Marchia Wallie (lands controlled by Norman Marcher barons)

After the Norman Conquest of 1066 by William I, dissent and resistance continued for many years after the invasion. In 1069 local resistance in Cheshire was finally put down using draconian measures as part of the Harrying of the North. The ferocity of the campaign against the English populace was enough to end all future resistance. Examples were made of major landowners such as Earl Edwin of Mercia, their properties confiscated and redistributed amongst Norman barons.

The earldom was sufficiently independent from the kingdom of England that the 13th-century Magna Carta did not apply to the shire of Chester, so the earl wrote up his own Chester Charter at the petition of his barons.

=== County Palatine ===
William I made Cheshire a county palatine and gave Gerbod the Fleming the new title of Earl of Chester. When Gerbod returned to Normandy in about 1070, the king used his absence to declare the earldom forfeit and gave the title to Hugh d'Avranches (nicknamed Hugh Lupus, or "wolf"). Because of Cheshire's strategic location on the Welsh Marches, the Earl had complete autonomous powers to rule on behalf of the king in the county palatine.

==== Hundreds ====
Hundreds of Cheshire in Domesday Book. Areas highlighted in pink became part of Flintshire in Wales.

Cheshire in the Domesday Book (1086) is recorded as a much larger county than it is today. It included two hundreds, Atiscross and Exestan, that later became part of North Wales. At the time of the Domesday Book, it also included as part of Duddestan Hundred the area of land later known as English Maelor (which used to be a detached part of Flintshire) in Wales. The area between the Mersey and Ribble (referred to in the Domesday Book as "Inter Ripam et Mersam") formed part of the returns for Cheshire. Although this has been interpreted to mean that at that time south Lancashire was part of Cheshire, more exhaustive research indicates that the boundary between Cheshire and what was to become Lancashire remained the River Mersey. With minor variations in spelling across sources, the complete list of hundreds of Cheshire at this time are: Atiscross, Bochelau, Chester, Dudestan, Exestan, Hamestan, Middlewich, Riseton, Roelau, Tunendune, Warmundestrou and Wilaveston.

==== Feudal baronies ====
There were 8 feudal baronies in Chester, the barons of Kinderton, Halton, Malbank, Mold, Shipbrook, Dunham-Massey, and the honour of Chester itself. Feudal baronies or baronies by tenure were granted by the Earl as forms of feudal land tenure within the palatinate in a similar way to which the king granted English feudal baronies within England proper. An example is the barony of Halton. One of Hugh d'Avranche's barons has been identified as Robert Nicholls, Baron of Halton and Montebourg.

==== North Mersey to Lancashire ====
In 1182, the land north of the Mersey became administered as part of the new county of Lancashire, resolving any uncertainty about the county in which the land "Inter Ripam et Mersam" was. Over the years, the ten hundreds consolidated and changed names to leave just seven—Broxton, Bucklow, Eddisbury, Macclesfield, Nantwich, Northwich and Wirral.

=== Principality: Merging of Palatine and Earldom ===
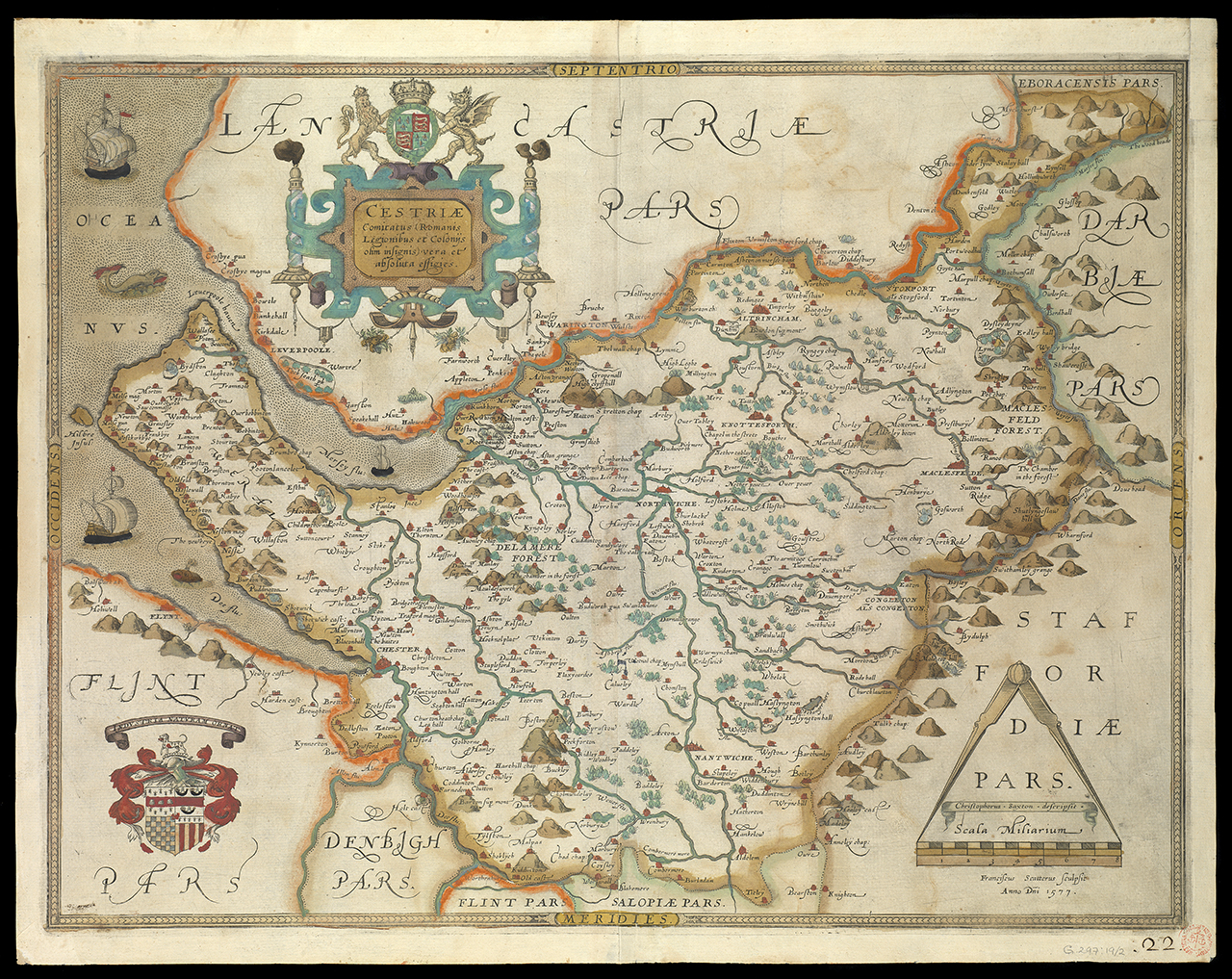
Map of Cheshire by Christopher Saxton from 1577.

In 1397 the county had lands in the march of Wales added to its territory, and was promoted to the rank of principality. This was because of the support the men of the county had given to King Richard II, in particular by his standing armed force of about 500 men called the "Cheshire Guard". As a result, the King's title was changed to "King of England and France, Lord of Ireland, and Prince of Chester". No other English county has been honoured in this way, although it lost the distinction on Richard's fall in 1399.

=== Lieutenancy: North split-off ===
==== District ====
The Redcliffe-Maud Report of 1969 suggested that Cheshire be abolished as an administrative county, with its parts subdivided between Merseyside, Stoke-on-Trent and [what was then called] South-East Lancashire & North East Cheshire (SELNEC). A series of compromises between the report and its implementation retained Cheshire as an administrative county.

Through the Local Government Act 1972, which came into effect on 1 April 1974, some areas in the north became part of the metropolitan counties of Greater Manchester and Merseyside. Stockport (previously a county borough), Altrincham, Hyde, Dukinfield and Stalybridge in the north-east became part of Greater Manchester. Much of the Wirral Peninsula in the north-west, including the county boroughs of Birkenhead and Wallasey, joined Merseyside as the Metropolitan Borough of Wirral. At the same time the Tintwistle Rural District was transferred to Derbyshire. The area of south Lancashire not included within either the Merseyside or Greater Manchester counties, including Widnes and the county borough of Warrington, was added to the new non-metropolitan county of Cheshire.

==== District and Unitary ====
Halton and Warrington became unitary authorities independent of Cheshire County Council on 1 April 1998, but remain part of Cheshire for ceremonial purposes and also for fire and policing. Halton is part of Liverpool City Region combined authority, which also includes the five metropolitan boroughs of Merseyside.

A referendum for a further local government reform connected with an elected regional assembly was planned for 2004, but was abandoned following the decisive 'no' vote in a similar referendum in North East England.

==== Unitary ====
As part of the local government restructuring in April 2009, Cheshire County Council and the Cheshire districts were abolished and replaced by two new unitary authorities, Cheshire East and Cheshire West and Chester. The existing unitary authorities of Halton and Warrington were not affected by the change.

== Governance ==
=== Current ===
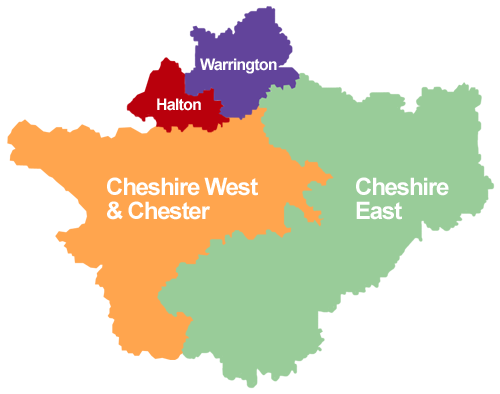
The ceremonial county showing the four unitary authorities. Click on the map for more information

Unit	Admin-HQ	Population (2025)	Area (km^{2})	Density (km^{2})	Head	Party	Combined authority
Cheshire East	Sandbach	425,459	1,166	365	Sam Corcoran		Cheshire and Warringon
Cheshire West and Chester	Winsford, Ellesmere Port	373,951	920	406	Louise Gittins	No overall control	Cheshire and Warringon
Halton	Widnes	131,912	79	1,668	Mike Wharton	Labour	Liverpool City Region
Warrington	Warrington	215,425	181	1,193	Russ Bowden	Labour	Cheshire and Warringon

Cheshire has no county-wide elected local council, but it does have a Lord Lieutenant under the Lieutenancies Act 1997 and a High Sheriff under the Sheriffs Act 1887.

Local government functions apart from the Police and Fire/Rescue services are carried out by four smaller unitary authorities: Cheshire East, Cheshire West and Chester, Halton, and Warrington. All four unitary authority areas have borough status.

Policing and fire and rescue services are still provided across the county as a whole. The Cheshire Fire Authority consist of members of the four councils, while governance of Cheshire Constabulary is performed by the elected Cheshire Police and Crime Commissioner.

Winsford is a major administrative hub for Cheshire with the Police and Fire & Rescue Headquarters based in the town as well as a majority of Cheshire West and Chester Council. It was also home to the former Vale Royal Borough Council and Cheshire County Council.

Devolution talks for the county were scheduled for Autumn 2024. Halton Borough Council has been a member of the Liverpool City Region Combined Authority since that authority was established in 2014. The Cheshire and Warrington Combined Authority, which includes Cheshire East Council, Cheshire West and Chester Council, and Warrington Borough Council, was established in February 2026 and will hold its first elections in May 2027.

=== Transition into a lieutenancy ===
From 1 April 1974 the area under the control of the county council was divided into eight local government districts; Chester, Congleton, Crewe and Nantwich, Ellesmere Port and Neston, Halton, Macclesfield, Vale Royal and Warrington. Halton (which includes the towns of Runcorn and Widnes) and Warrington became unitary authorities in 1998. The remaining districts and the county were abolished as part of local government restructuring on 1 April 2009. The Halton and Warrington boroughs were not affected by the 2009 restructuring.

On 25 July 2007, the Secretary of State Hazel Blears announced she was 'minded' to split Cheshire into two new unitary authorities, Cheshire West and Chester, and Cheshire East. She confirmed she had not changed her mind on 19 December 2007 and therefore the proposal to split two-tier Cheshire into two would proceed. Cheshire County Council leader Paul Findlow, who attempted High Court legal action against the proposal, claimed that splitting Cheshire would only disrupt excellent services while increasing living costs for all. On 31 January 2008 The Standard, Cheshire and district's newspaper, announced that the legal action had been dropped. Members against the proposal were advised that they may be unable to persuade the court that the decision of Hazel Blears was "manifestly absurd".

The Cheshire West and Chester unitary authority covers the area formerly occupied by the City of Chester and the boroughs of Ellesmere Port and Neston and Vale Royal; Cheshire East now covers the area formerly occupied by the boroughs of Congleton, Crewe and Nantwich, and Macclesfield. The changes were implemented on 1 April 2009.

Congleton Borough Council pursued an appeal against the judicial review it lost in October 2007. The appeal was dismissed on 4 March 2008.

== Geography ==
=== Physical ===
A plain of glacial till and other glacio-fluvial sediments extends across much of Cheshire, separating the hills of North Wales and the Pennines. Known as the Cheshire Plain, it was formed following the retreat of a Quaternary ice sheet which left the area dotted with kettle holes, those which hold water being referred to as meres. The bedrock of this region is almost entirely Triassic sandstone, outcrops of which have long been quarried, notably at Runcorn, providing the distinctive red stone for Liverpool Cathedral and Chester Cathedral.

The eastern half of the county is Upper Triassic Mercia Mudstone laid down with large salt deposits which were mined for hundreds of years around Winsford. Separating this area from Lower Triassic Sherwood Sandstone to the west is a prominent sandstone ridge known as the Mid Cheshire Ridge. A 55-kilometre (34 mi) footpath, the Sandstone Trail, follows this ridge from Frodsham to Whitchurch passing Delamere Forest, Beeston Castle and earlier Iron Age forts.

The western fringes of the Peak District - the southernmost extent of the Pennine range - form the eastern part of the county. The highest point (county top) in the historic county of Cheshire was Black Hill (582 m (1,909 ft)) near Crowden in the Cheshire Panhandle, a long eastern projection of the county which formerly stretched along the northern side of Longdendale and on the border with the West Riding of Yorkshire. Black Hill is now the highest point in the ceremonial county of West Yorkshire.

Within the current ceremonial county and the unitary authority of Cheshire East the highest point is Shining Tor on the Derbyshire/Cheshire border between Macclesfield and Buxton, at 559 metres (1,834 ft) above sea level. After Shining Tor, the next highest point in Cheshire is Shutlingsloe, at 506 metres (1,660 ft) above sea level. Shutlingsloe lies just to the south of Macclesfield Forest and is sometimes humorously referred to as the "Matterhorn of Cheshire" thanks to its distinctive steep profile.

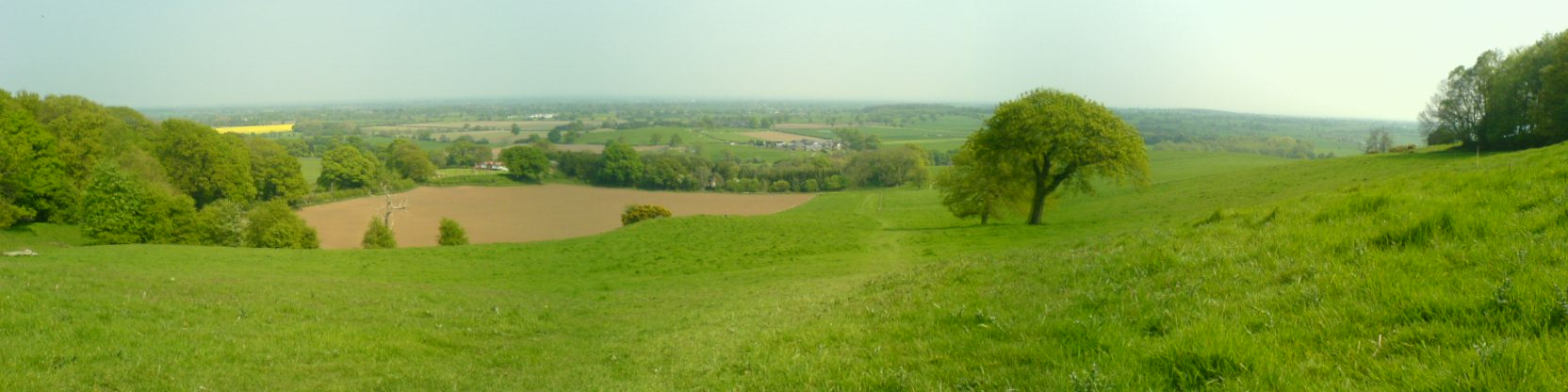
The Cheshire Plain from the Mid-Cheshire Ridge.

=== Human ===
==== Green belt ====
Cheshire contains portions of two green belt areas surrounding the large conurbations of Merseyside and Greater Manchester (North Cheshire Green Belt, part of the North West Green Belt) and Stoke-on-Trent (South Cheshire Green Belt, part of the Stoke-on-Trent Green Belt), these were first drawn up from the 1950s. Contained primarily within Cheshire East and Chester West & Chester, with small portions along the borders of the Halton and Warrington districts, towns and cities such as Chester, Macclesfield, Alsager, Congleton, Northwich, Ellesmere Port, Knutsford, Warrington, Poynton, Disley, Neston, Wilmslow, Runcorn, and Widnes are either surrounded wholly, partially enveloped by, or on the fringes of the belts. The North Cheshire Green Belt is contiguous with the Peak District Park boundary inside Cheshire.

==== Borders ====
The ceremonial county borders Merseyside, Greater Manchester, Derbyshire, Staffordshire and Shropshire in England along with Flintshire and Wrexham in Wales, arranged by compass directions as shown in the table below. Cheshire also forms part of the North West England region.

=== Flora and fauna ===
In July 2022, Eurasian beavers bred in Cheshire for the first time in 400 years, following a reintroduction scheme.

== Demography ==
=== Population ===
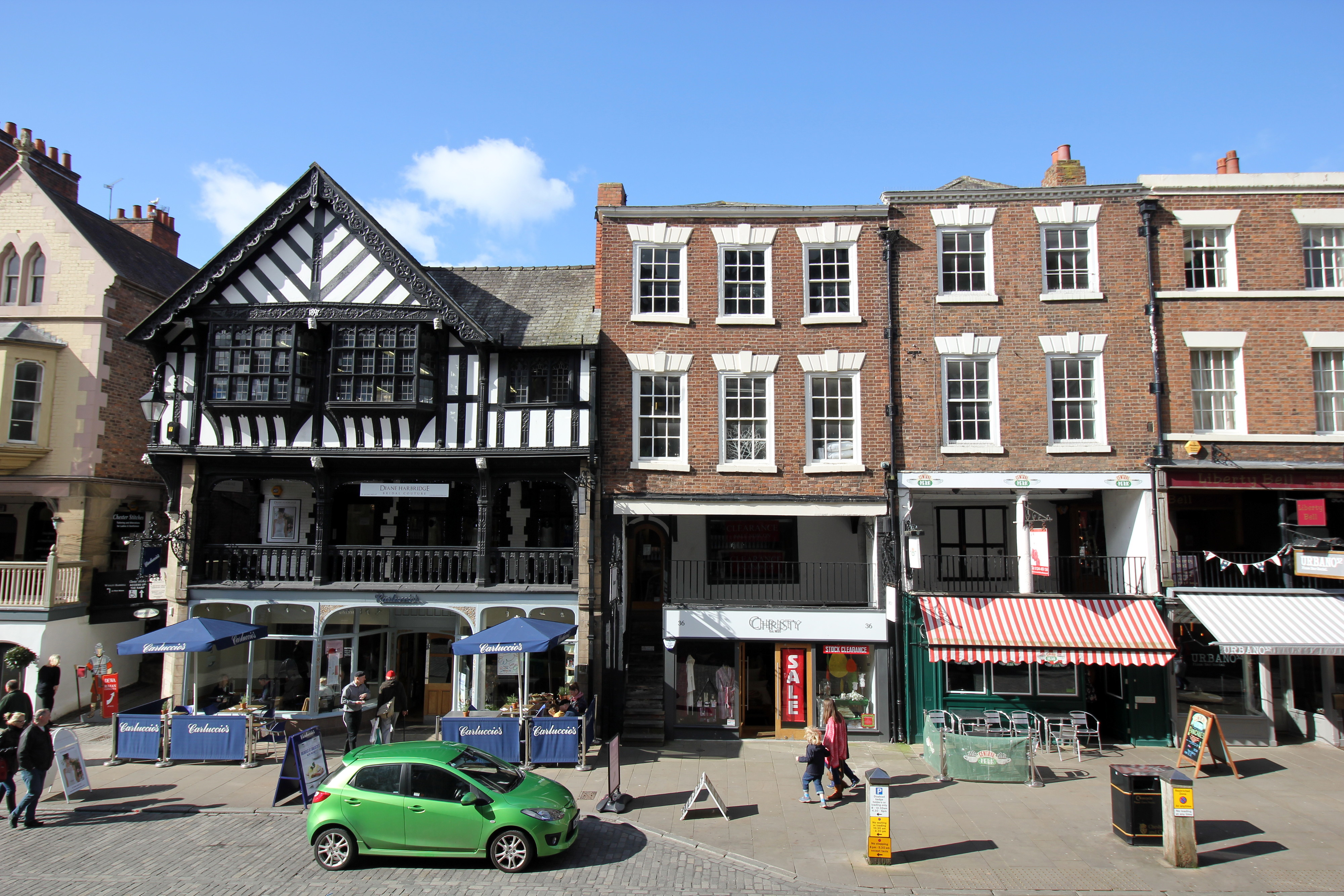
Chester

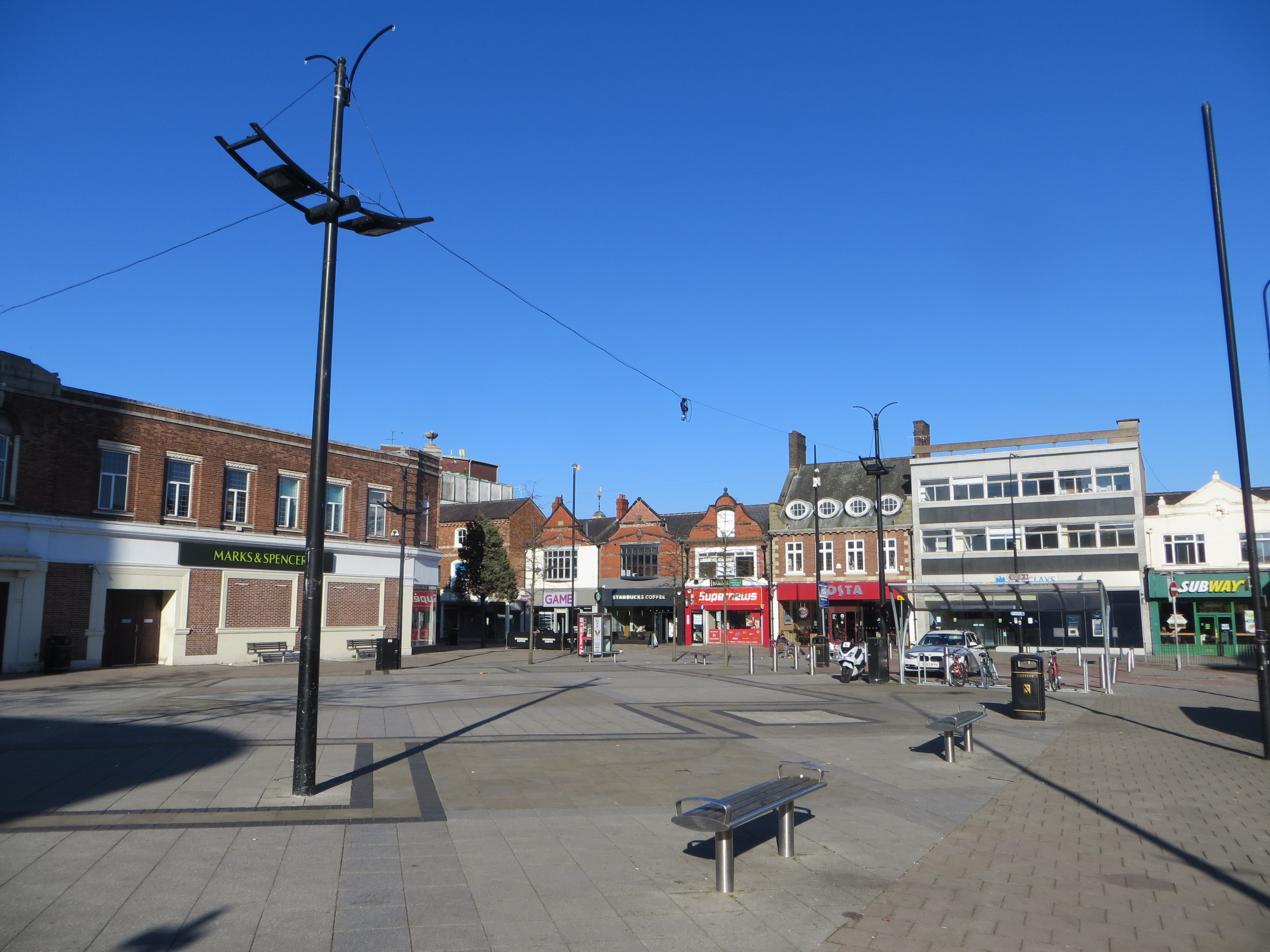
Crewe

Based on the Census of 2001, the overall population of Cheshire East and Cheshire West and Chester is 673,781, of which 51.3% of the population were male and 48.7% were female. Of those aged between 0–14 years, 51.5% were male and 48.4% were female; and of those aged over 75 years, 62.9% were female and 37.1% were male. This increased to 699,735 at the 2011 Census. The population for 2021 is forecast to be 708,000.

In 2001, the population density of Cheshire East and Cheshire West and Chester was 32 people per km^{2}, lower than the North West average of 42 people/km^{2} and the England and Wales average of 38 people/km^{2}. Ellesmere Port and Neston had a greater urban density than the rest of the county with 92 people/km^{2}.

Population totals for Cheshire East, Cheshire West and Chester (Note: Pre-1974 statistics were gathered from local government areas that now compose Cheshire Source: Great Britain Historical GIS.)
Year	Population	Chart
1801	124,570	View source data.
1811	141,672	View source data.
1821	167,730	View source data.
1831	191,965	View source data.
1841	206,063	View source data.
1851	224,739	View source data.
1861	250,931	View source data.
1871	277,123	View source data.
1881	303,315	View source data.
1891	324,494	View source data.
1901	343,557	View source data.
1911	364,179	View source data.
1921	379,157	View source data.
1931	395,717	View source data.
1941	431,335	View source data.
1951	471,438	View source data.
1961	533,642	View source data.
1971	605,918	View source data.
1981	632,630	View source data.
1991	656,050	View source data.
2001	673,777	View source data.
2011	699,735	View source data.
2021	755,835	View source data.

Population of Cheshire by district (2025)
District	Land area		Population		Density (/km^{2})
District	(km^{2})	(%)	People	(%)	Density (/km^{2})
Cheshire East	1,166	50%	425,459	37%	365
Cheshire West and Chester	920	39%	373,951	33%	406
Halton	79	3%	131,912	12%	1,668
Warrington	181	8%	215,425	19%	1,193
Cheshire	2,346	100%	1,146,747	100%	489

=== Ethnicity ===
In 2001, ethnic white groups accounted for 98% (662,794) of the population, and 10,994 (2%) in ethnic groups other than white.

Of the 2% in non-white ethnic groups:

- 3,717 (34%) belonged to mixed ethnic groups
- 3,336 (30%) were Asian or Asian British
- 1,076 (10%) were black or black British
- 1,826 (17%) were of Chinese ethnic groups
- 1,039 (9%) were of other ethnic groups.

== Religion ==
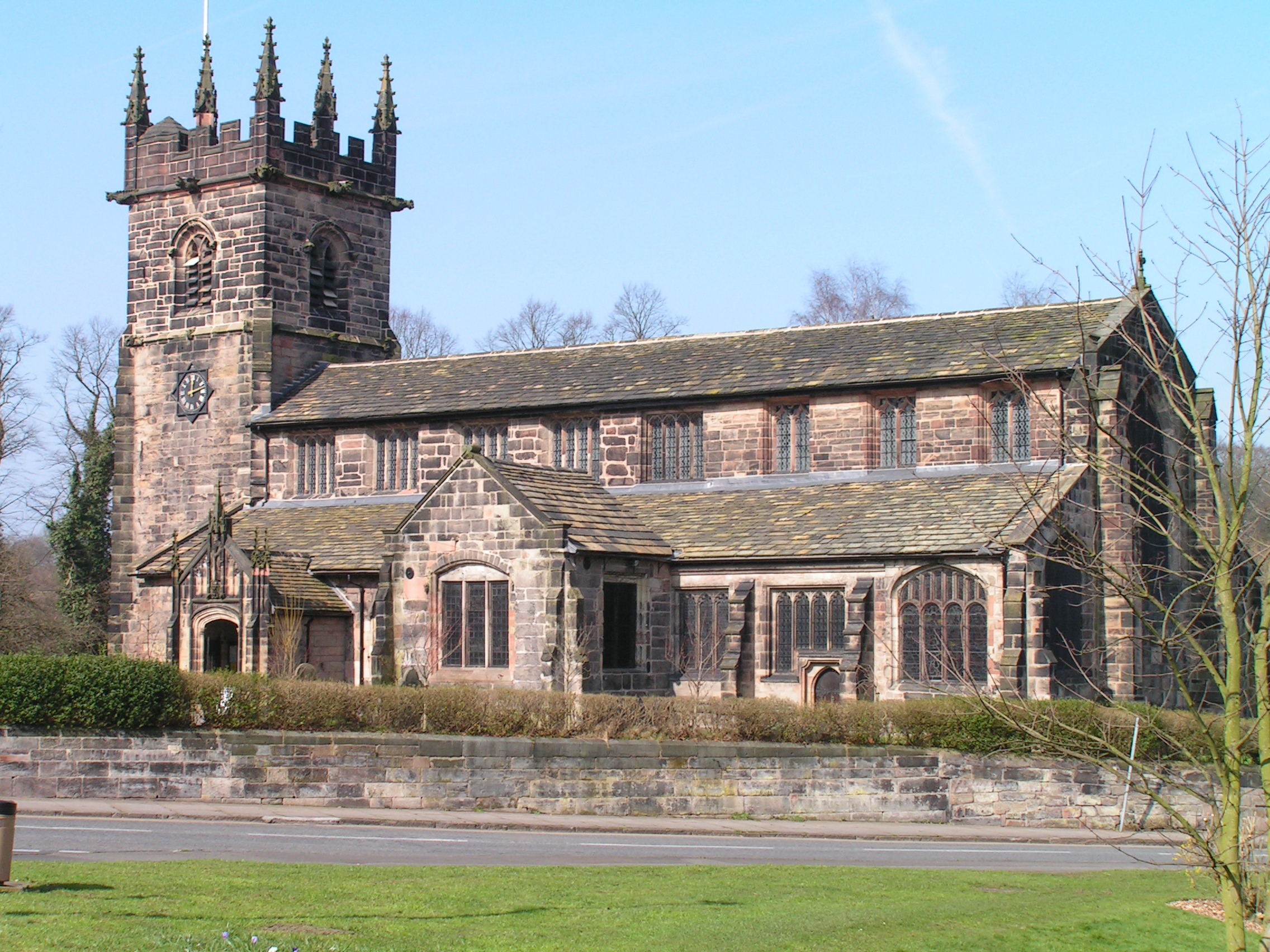
St Bartholomew's Church in Wilmslow

In the 2001 Census, 81% of the population (542,413) identified themselves as Christian; 124,677 (19%) did not identify with any religion or did not answer the question; 5,665 (1%) identified themselves as belonging to other major world religions; and 1,033 belonged to other religions.

The boundary of the Church of England Diocese of Chester follows most closely the pre-1974 county boundary of Cheshire, so it includes all of Wirral, Stockport, and the Cheshire panhandle that included Tintwistle Rural District council area. In terms of Roman Catholic church administration, most of Cheshire falls into the Roman Catholic Diocese of Shrewsbury.

== Economy ==
GVA and GDP by local authority district in 2021
District	GVA (£ billions)	GVA per capita (£)	GDP (£ billions)	GDP per capita (£)
Cheshire East	£14.6	£36,559	£16.1	£40,142
Cheshire West and Chester	£11.7	£32,846	£13.1	£36,518
Warrington	£8.5	£40,085	£9.3	£44,205
Cheshire*	£34.9	£35,957	£38.5	£39,689
*Excluding Halton which forms part of the Liverpool City Region for economic purposes

Cheshire has a diverse economy with significant sectors including agriculture, automotive, bio-technology, chemical, financial services, food and drink, ICT, and tourism. The county is famous for the production of Cheshire cheese, salt and silk. The county has seen a number of inventions and firsts in its history.

A mainly rural county, Cheshire has a high concentration of villages. Agriculture is generally based on the dairy trade, and cattle are the predominant livestock. Land use given to agriculture has fluctuated somewhat, and in 2005 totalled 1558 km^{2} over 4,609 holdings. Based on holdings by EC farm type in 2005, 8.51 km^{2} was allocated to dairy farming, with another 11.78 km^{2} allocated to cattle and sheep.

A resident of Knutsford sanding the street in celebration of May Day in 1920

The chemical industry in Cheshire was founded in Roman times, with the mining of salt in Winsford, Middlewich and Northwich. Salt is still mined in the area by British Salt. The salt mining has led to a continued chemical industry around Northwich, with Brunner Mond based in the town. Other chemical companies, including Ineos (formerly ICI), have plants at Runcorn. The Essar Refinery (formerly Shell Stanlow Refinery) is at Ellesmere Port. The oil refinery has operated since 1924 and has a capacity of 12 million tonnes per year.

Crewe was once the centre of the British railway industry, and remains a major railway junction. The Crewe railway works, built in 1840, employed 20,000 people at its peak, although the workforce is now less than 1,000. Crewe is also the home of Bentley cars. Also within Cheshire are manufacturing plants for Jaguar and Vauxhall Motors in Ellesmere Port.

The county also has an aircraft industry. On the Cheshire border with Flintshire is the Broughton aircraft factory, more recently associated with Airbus. For nearly 80 years until it closed in 2011, aircraft were designed and built at Woodford Aerodrome, including Avro Lancaster and Avro Vulcan bombers and the Hawker-Siddeley Nimrod.

Tourism in Cheshire from within the UK and overseas continues to perform strongly. Over 8 million nights of accommodation (both UK and overseas) and over 2.8 million visits to Cheshire were recorded during 2003.

At the start of 2003, there were 22,020 VAT-registered enterprises in Cheshire, an increase of 7% since 1998, many in the business services (31.9%) and wholesale/retail (21.7%) sectors. Between 2002 and 2003 the number of businesses grew in four sectors: public administration and other services (6.0%), hotels and restaurants (5.1%), construction (1.7%), and business services (1.0%). The county saw the largest proportional reduction between 2001 and 2002 in employment in the energy and water sector and there was also a significant reduction in the manufacturing sector. The largest growth during this period was in the other services and distribution, hotels and retail sectors.

Cheshire is considered to be an affluent county. However, towns such as Crewe and Winsford have significant deprivation. The county's proximity to the cities of Manchester and Liverpool means counter urbanisation is common. Cheshire West has a fairly large proportion of residents who work in Liverpool and Manchester, while the town of Northwich and area of Cheshire East falls more within Manchester's sphere of influence.

== Education ==
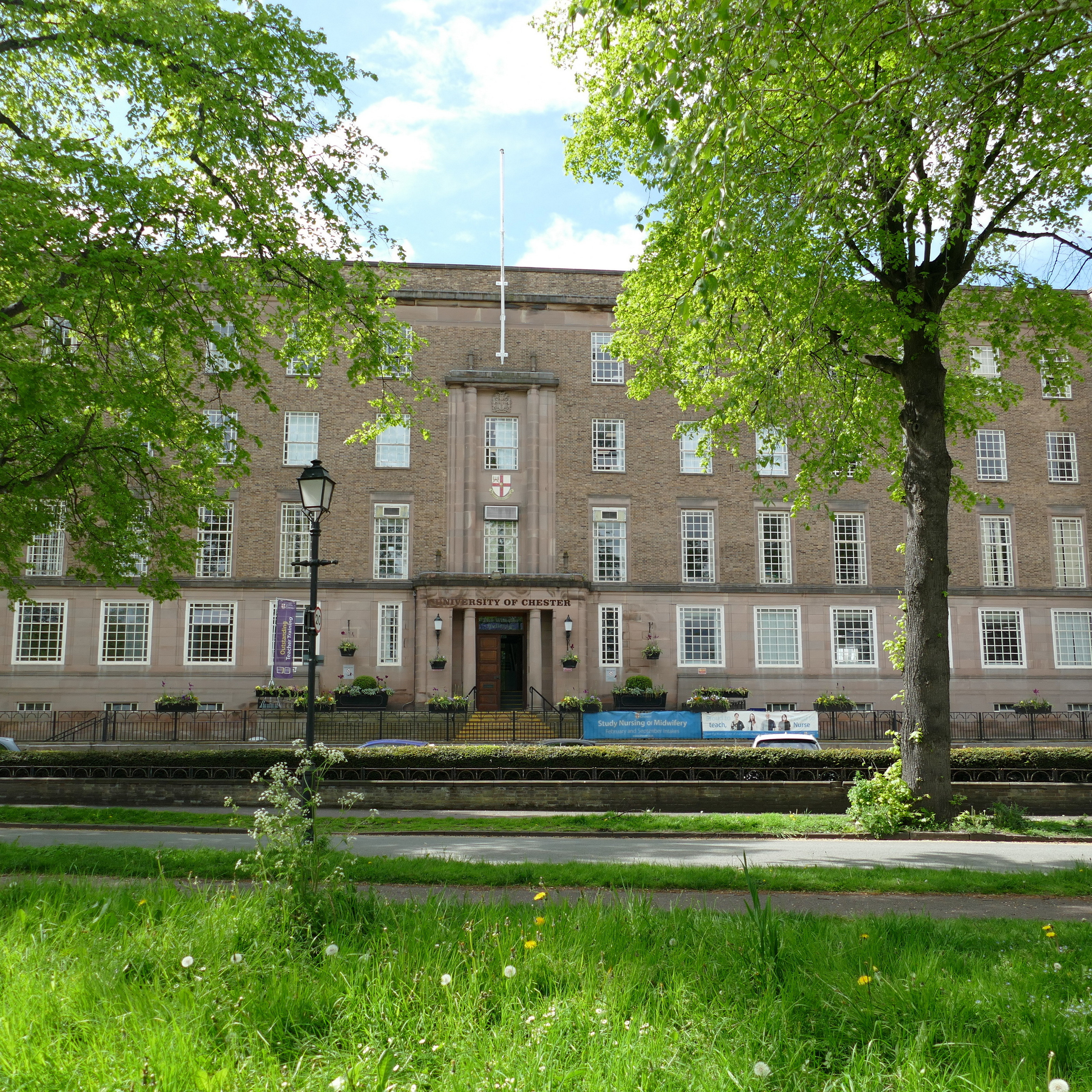
University of Chester

All four local education authorities in Cheshire operate only comprehensive state school systems. When Altrincham, Sale and Bebington were moved from Cheshire to Trafford and Merseyside in 1974, they took some former Cheshire selective schools. There are two universities based in the county, the University of Chester and the Chester campus of The University of Law. The Crewe campus of Manchester Metropolitan University was scheduled to close in 2019.

== Culture ==
=== Arts and entertainment ===
The flag of the historic county of Cheshire

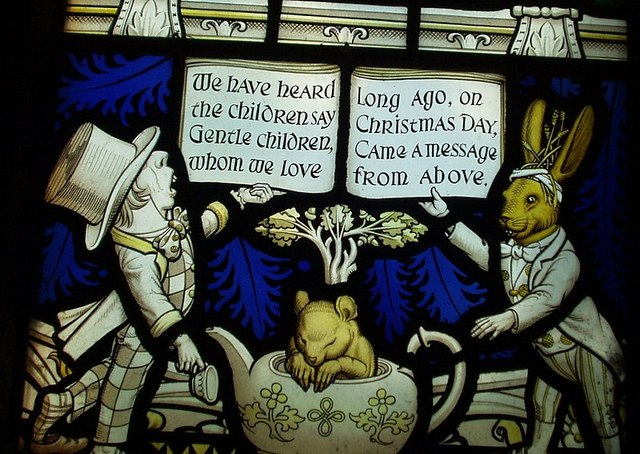
Lewis Carroll memorial window (featuring the Hatter and March Hare)

Cheshire has produced musicians such as Joy Division members Ian Curtis and Stephen Morris, One Direction member Harry Styles, the members of the 1975, Take That member Gary Barlow, the Cult member Ian Astbury, Catfish and the Bottlemen member Van McCann, Girls Aloud member Nicola Roberts, Stephen Hough, John Mayall, the Charlatans member Tim Burgess, and Nigel Stonier.

Actors from Cheshire include Russ Abbot, Warren Brown, Julia Chan, Ray Coulthard, Daniel Craig, Tim Curry, Wendy Hiller, Tom Hughes, Tim McInnerny, Ben Miller, Pete Postlethwaite, Adam Rickitt, John Steiner, and Ann Todd. The most famous author from the county is Lewis Carroll, who wrote Alice's Adventures in Wonderland and named the Cheshire Cat character after it. Other notable Cheshire writers include Hall Caine, Alan Garner, and Elizabeth Gaskell. Artists from Cheshire include ceramic artist Emma Bossons and sculptor/photographer Andy Goldsworthy.

Local news and television programmes are provided by BBC North West and ITV Granada. Television signals are received from the Winter Hill TV transmitter.

Local radio stations in the county include Chester's Dee Radio, Capital North West and Wales, Smooth Wales, Cheshire's Silk Radio and Hits Radio Staffordshire & Cheshire. It is one of only four counties in the country (along with County Durham, Dorset, and Rutland) that does not have its own designated BBC radio station; the south and parts of the east are covered by BBC Radio Stoke, while BBC Radio Merseyside tends to cover the west, and BBC Radio Manchester covers the north and parts of the east. The BBC directs readers to Stoke and Staffordshire when Cheshire is selected on their website. There were plans to launch BBC Radio Cheshire, but those were shelved in 2007 after the BBC licence fee settlement was lower than expected.

=== Sports ===
Athletes native to Cheshire include sailor Ben Ainslie, cricketer Ian Botham, rock climber Shauna Coxsey, boxer Tyson Fury, oarsman Matt Langridge, mountaineer George Mallory, marathon runner Paula Radcliffe, cyclist Sarah Storey, and hurdler Shirley Strong. It has also been home to numerous athletes from outside the county. Many Premier League footballers have relocated there over the years upon joining nearby teams such as Manchester United F.C., Manchester City F.C., Everton F.C., and Liverpool F.C.. These include Dean Ashton, Seth Johnson, Jesse Lingard and Michael Owen. The "Cheshire Golden Triangle" is the collective name for a group of adjacent Cheshire villages where the number of footballers, actors, and entrepreneurs moving in over the years led to the average house prices becoming some of the most expensive in the UK.

Cheshire has one Football League team, Crewe Alexandra, which plays in EFL League Two. The next highest-placed teams are Chester, Warrington Town and Macclesfield, who compete in the National League North, the sixth tier of English football. Macclesfield Town, a former League club, went into liquidation in 2020; a phoenix club, Macclesfield F.C., was formed in 2021, and was promoted to the National League North in 2025. Northwich Victoria, another ex-League team and founding member of the Football League Division Two in 1892/1893, now represents Cheshire in the Northern Premier League along with Nantwich Town.

The Warrington Wolves and Widnes Vikings are the premier rugby league teams in Cheshire; the former plays in the Super League, while the latter plays in the Championship. There are also numerous junior clubs in the county, including Chester Gladiators. Cheshire County Cricket Club is one of the clubs that make up the minor counties of English and Welsh cricket. Cheshire also is represented in the highest level basketball league in the UK, the BBL, by Cheshire Phoenix (formerly Cheshire Jets). Europe's largest motorcycle event, the Thundersprint, is held in Northwich every May.

=== Other ===
The Royal Cheshire Show, an annual agricultural show, has taken place since the 1800s.

Cheshire also produced a military hero in Norman Cyril Jones, a World War I flying ace who won the Distinguished Flying Cross.

=== Unofficial county flower ===
As part of a 2002 marketing campaign, the plant conservation charity Plantlife chose the cuckooflower as the county flower. Previously, a sheaf of golden wheat was the county emblem, a reference to the Earl of Chester's arms in use from the 12th century.

=== Landmarks ===
Buildings and structures of Cheshire
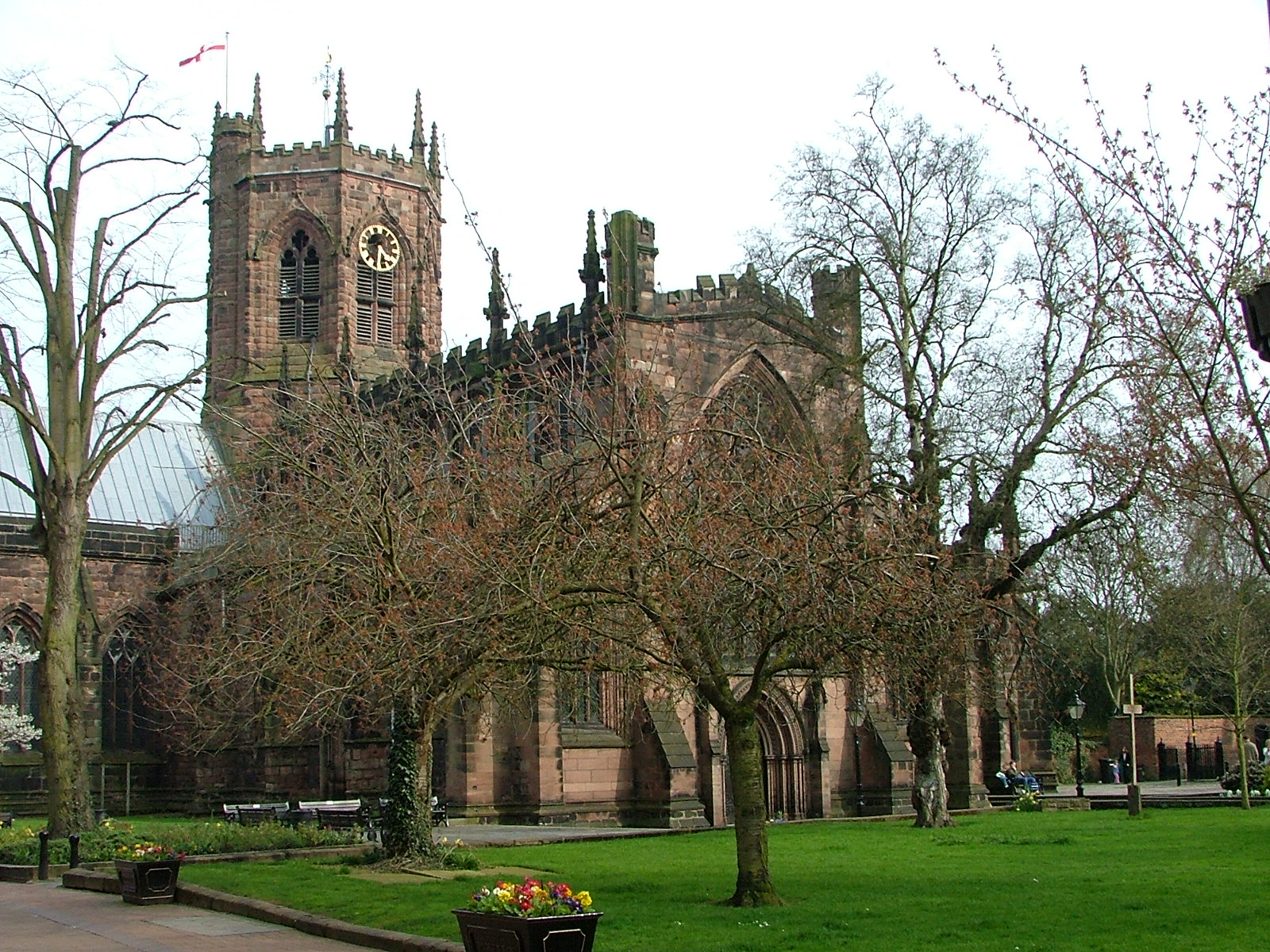
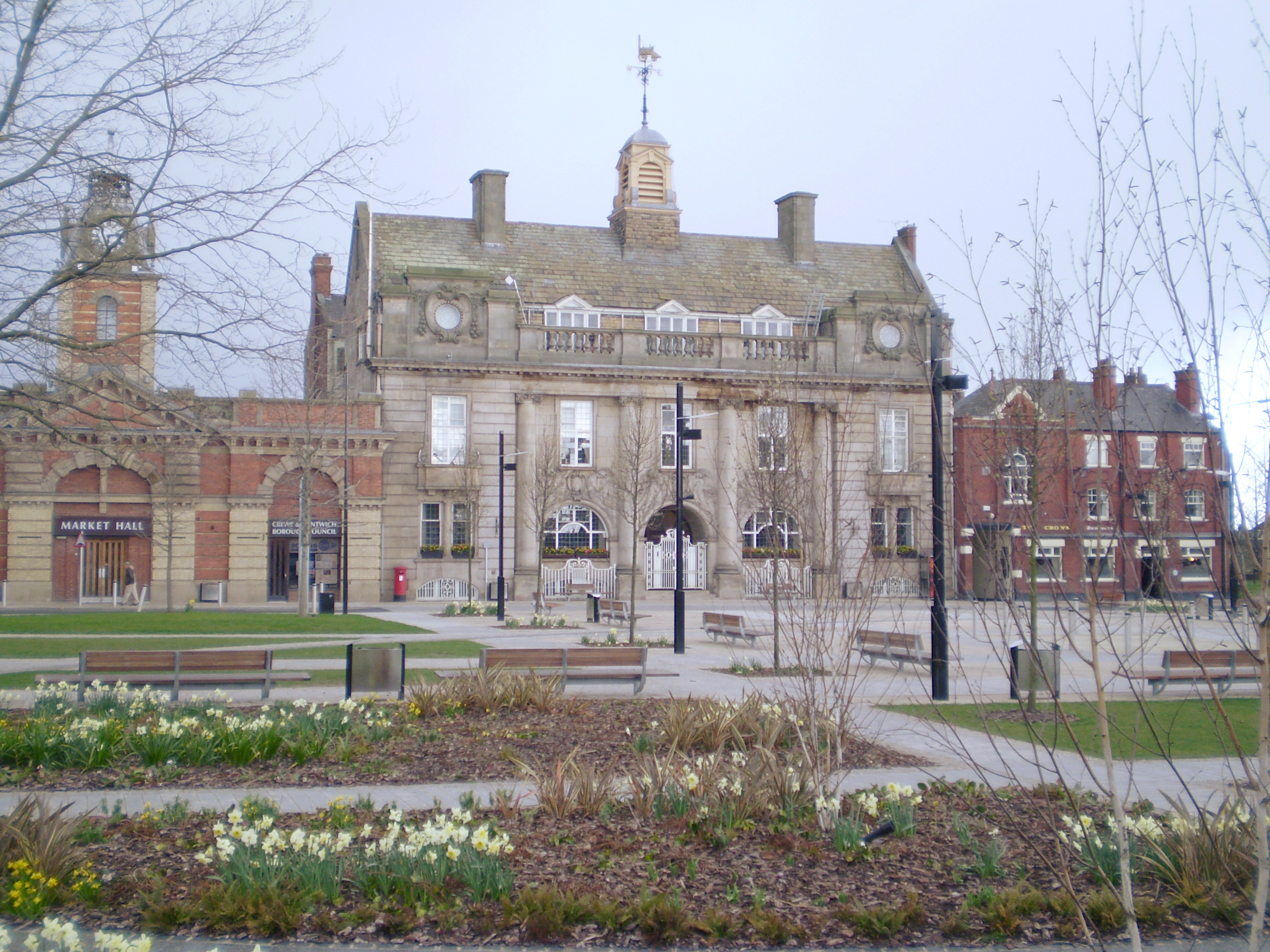
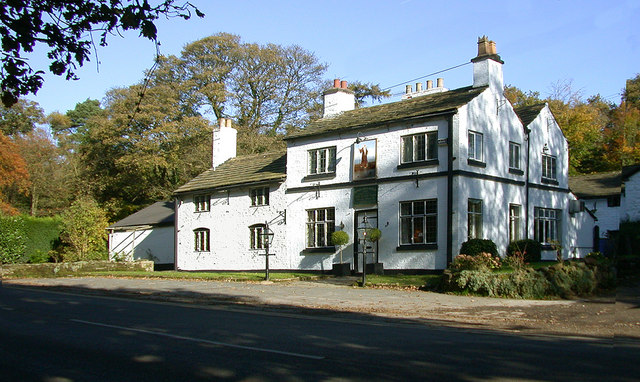
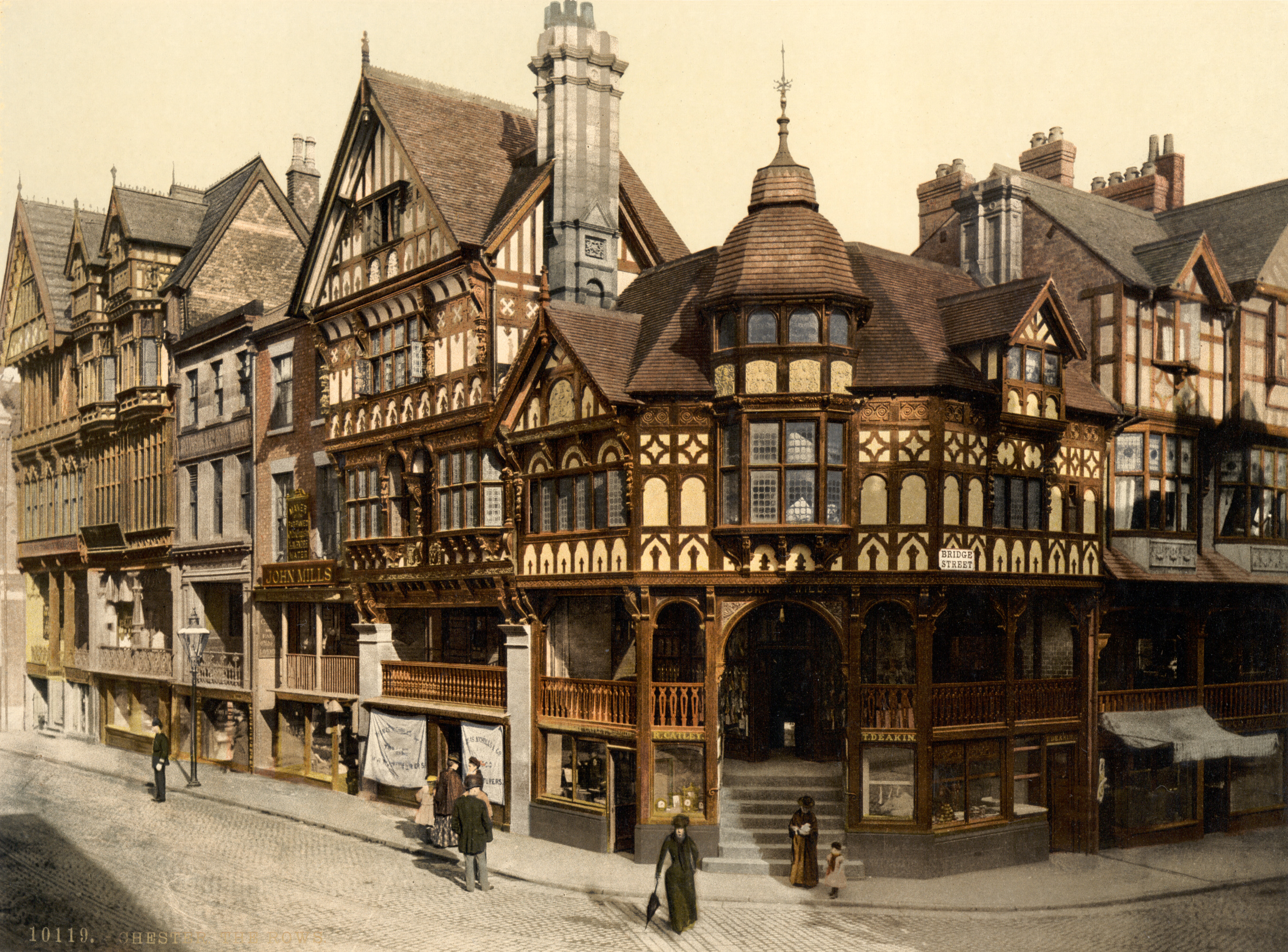
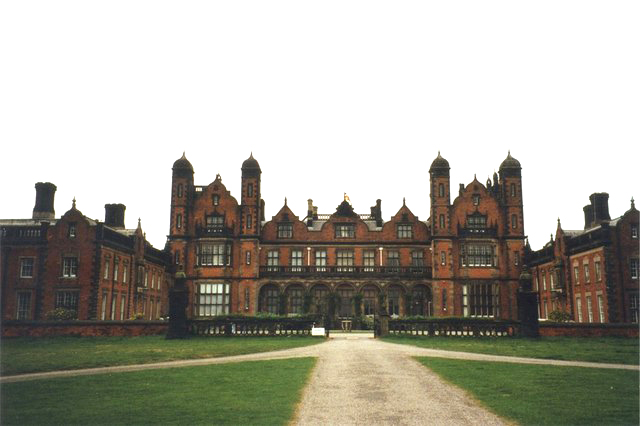
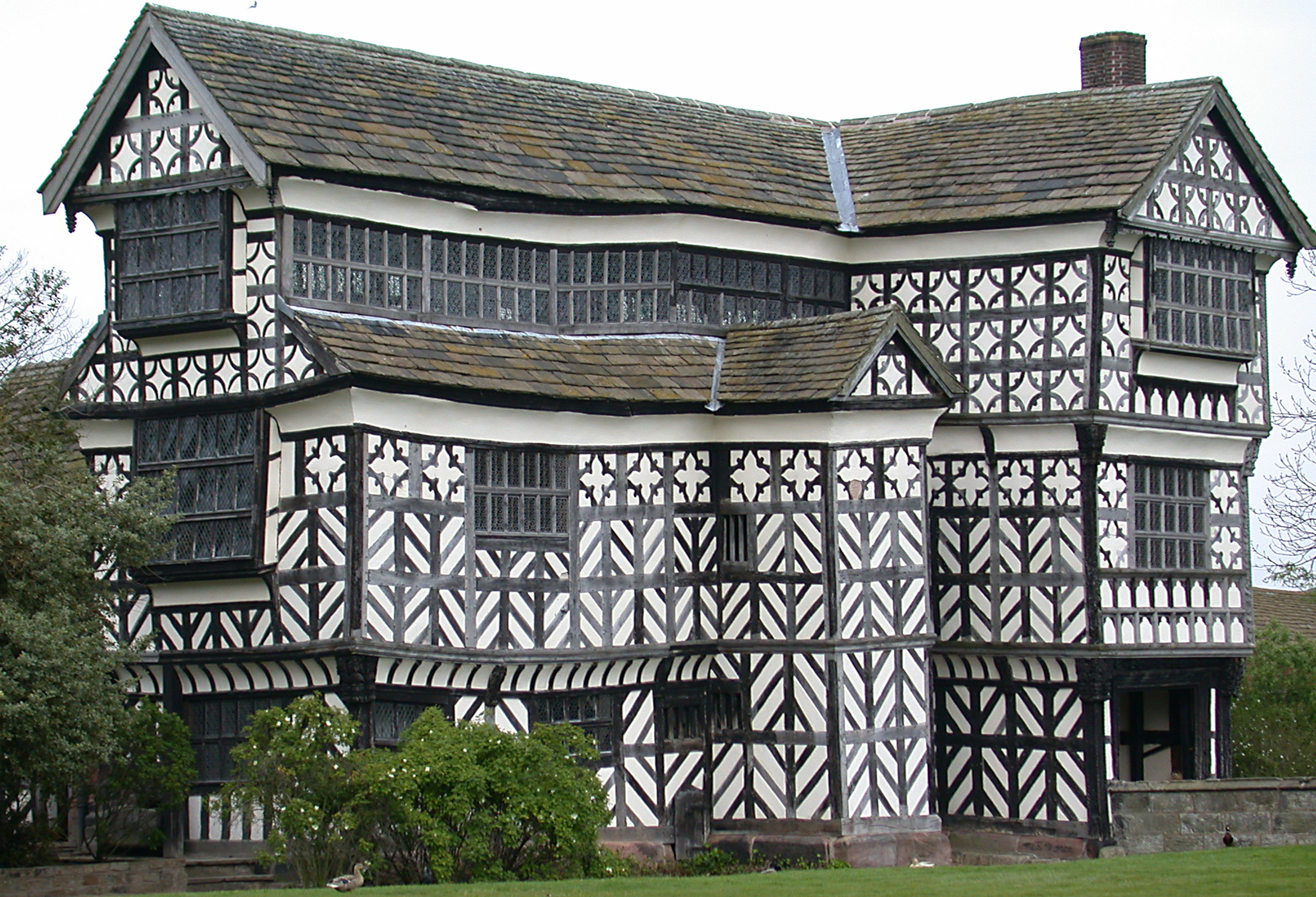
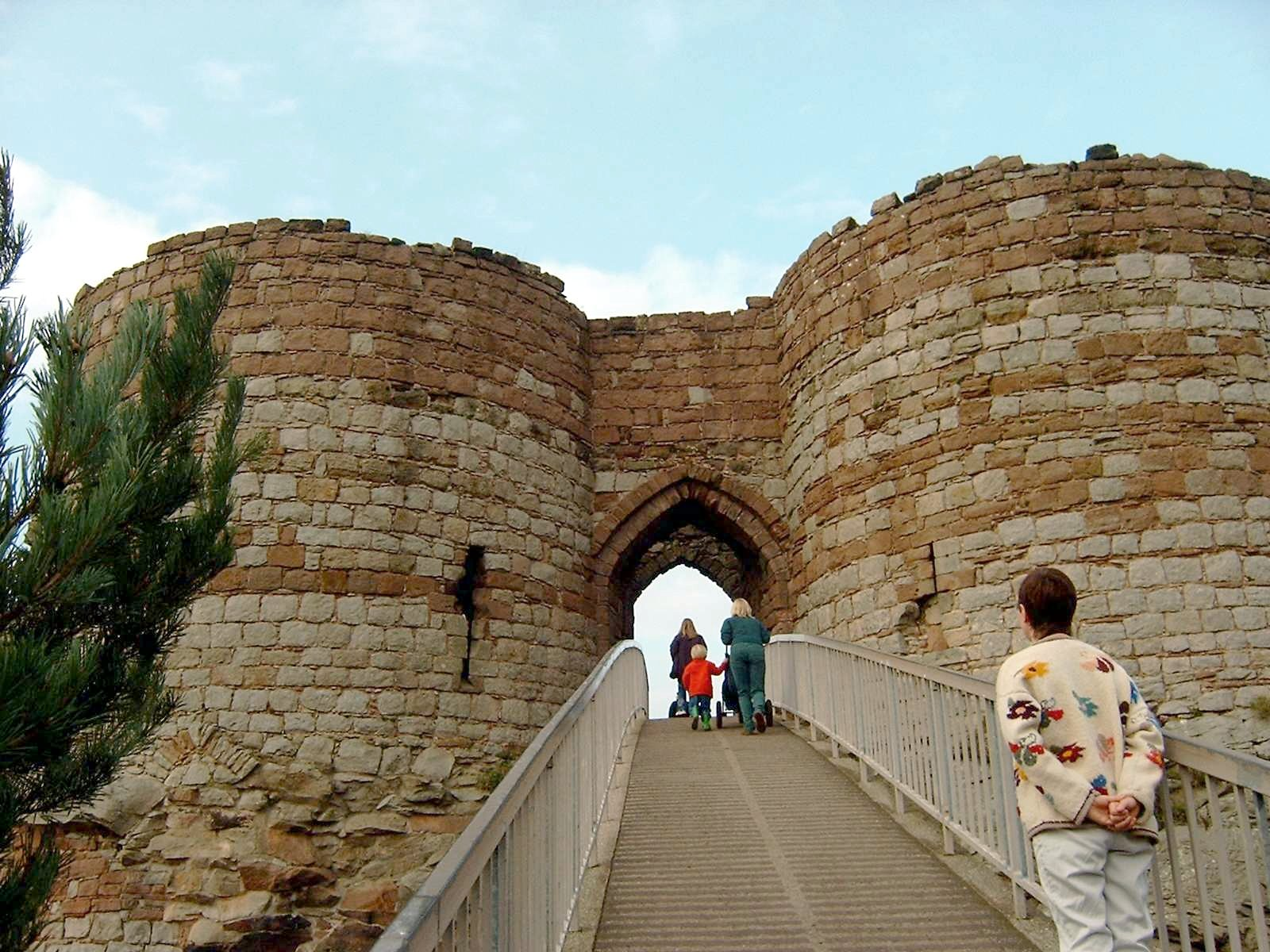
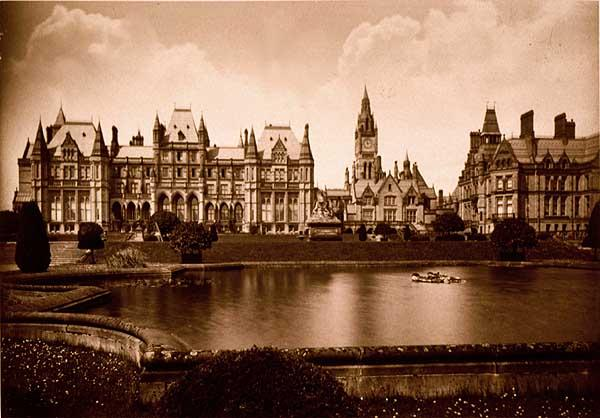
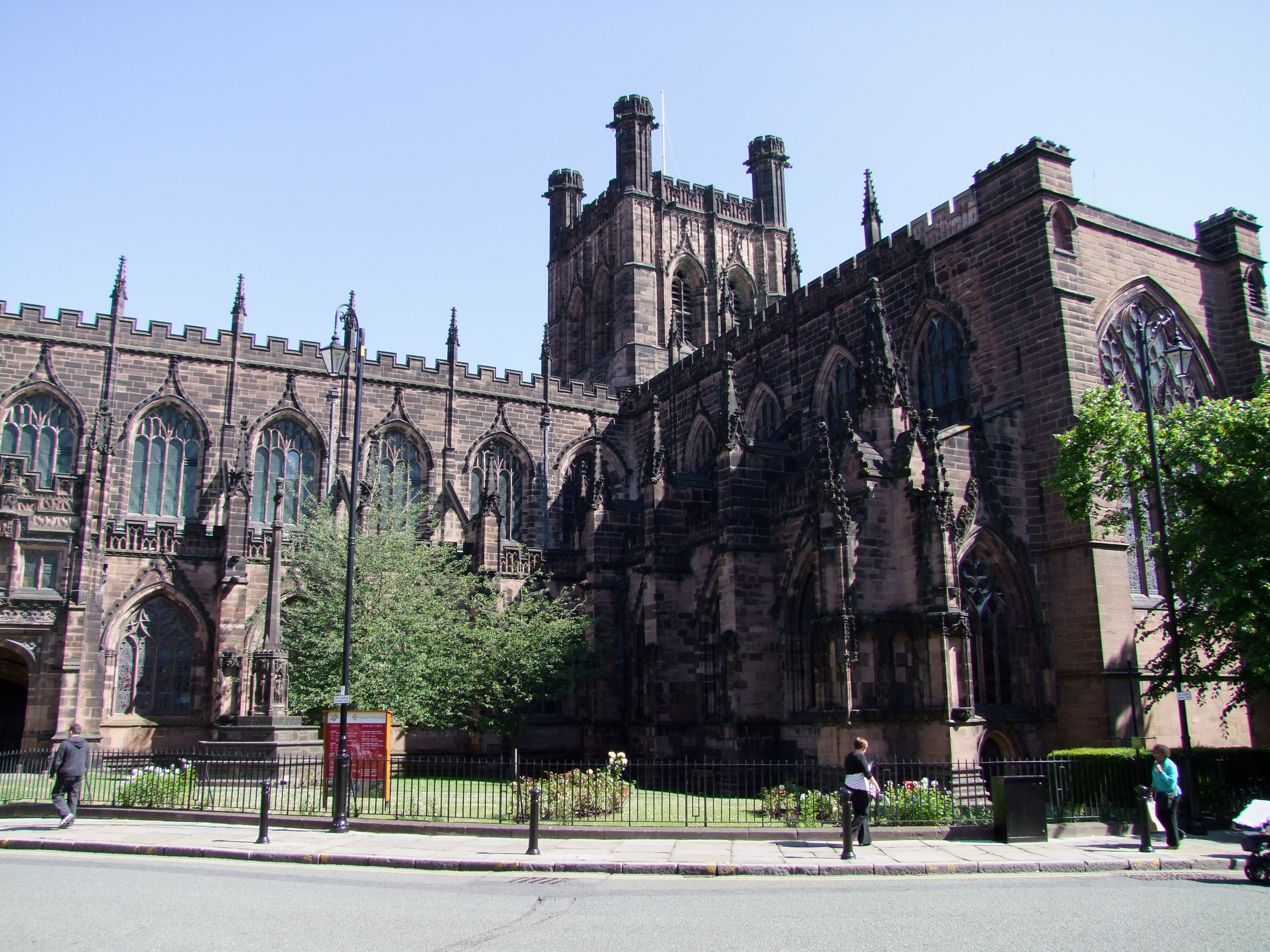
From top left to bottom right: St Mary Church in Nantwich, Crewe Town Council, The Wizard Pub (Alderley Edge), Chester Rows (Chester), Capesthorne Hall, Little Moreton Hall, Beeston Castle, Eaton Hall, and Chester Cathedral

Prehistoric burial grounds have been discovered at The Bridestones near Congleton (Neolithic) and Robin Hood's Tump near Alpraham (Bronze Age). The remains of Iron Age hill forts are found on sandstone ridges at several locations in Cheshire. Examples include Maiden Castle on Bickerton Hill, Helsby Hillfort and Woodhouse Hillfort at Frodsham. The Roman fortress and walls of Chester, perhaps the earliest building works in Cheshire remaining above ground, are constructed from purple-grey sandstone.

The distinctive local red sandstone has been used for many monumental and ecclesiastical buildings throughout the county: for example, the medieval Beeston Castle, Chester Cathedral and numerous parish churches. Occasional residential and industrial buildings, such as Helsby railway station (1849), are also in this sandstone.

Many surviving buildings from the 15th to 17th centuries are timbered, particularly in the southern part of the county. Notable examples include the moated manor house Little Moreton Hall, dating from around 1450, and many commercial and residential buildings in Chester, Nantwich and surrounding villages.

Early brick buildings include Peover Hall near Macclesfield (1585), Tattenhall Hall (pre-1622), and the Pied Bull Hotel in Chester (17th-century). From the 18th century, orange, red or brown brick became the predominant building material used in Cheshire, although earlier buildings are often faced or dressed with stone. Examples from the Victorian period onwards often employ distinctive brick detailing, such as brick patterning and ornate chimney stacks and gables. Notable examples include Arley Hall near Northwich, Willington Hall near Chester (both by Nantwich architect George Latham) and Overleigh Lodge, Chester. From the Victorian era, brick buildings often incorporate timberwork in a mock Tudor style, and this hybrid style has been used in some modern residential developments in the county. Industrial buildings, such as the Macclesfield silk mills (for example, Waters Green New Mill), are also usually in brick.

== Settlements ==
Notable places in Cheshire – red.
Towns historically in Cheshire – orange.

The county is home to some of the most affluent areas of northern England, including Alderley Edge, Wilmslow, Prestbury, Tarporley and Knutsford, named in 2006 as the most expensive place to buy a house in the north of England. The former Cheshire town of Altrincham was in second place. The area is sometimes referred to as The Golden Triangle on account of the area in and around the aforementioned towns and villages. Holmes Chapel has increasingly become a sought out tourist destination due to being the former hometown of celebrity Harry Styles, and is also undergoing a planned population increase.

Thingwall, currently in the county of Merseyside but historically part of Cheshire until 1974, is known for having once been the base of a Viking parliament established by Norse settlers in the area.

There is currently one city in the county officially, Chester. However, it remains a disputed piece of folklore that the village of Thelwall (today administratively paired with its neighbour Grappenhall in a civil parish) was at one time considered a city. Warrington is currently the largest urban settlement in the county overall despite its town status, and was one of the third wave of post-Second World War UK new towns designated for expansion. Other core settlements across Cheshire are:

District	Centre of administration	Other towns or cities
Cheshire East (unitary)	Sandbach	Alderley Edge, Alsager, Bollington, Crewe, Congleton, Handforth, Holmes Chapel, Knutsford, Macclesfield, Middlewich, Nantwich, Poynton, Wilmslow
Cheshire West and Chester (unitary)	Chester	Ellesmere Port, Frodsham, Malpas, Neston, Northwich, Saltney (eastern part), Tarporley, Tarvin, Winsford
Halton (unitary)	Widnes	Runcorn
Warrington (unitary)	Warrington	Birchwood, Culcheth, Lymm

Some settlements which were historically part of the county now fall under the ceremonial counties of Derbyshire, Merseyside and Greater Manchester:

Derbyshire	Crowden, Newtown, Tintwistle, Whaley Bridge (western part), Woodhead
Greater Manchester	Altrincham, Bramhall, Bredbury, Cheadle, Cheadle Hulme, Dukinfield, Gatley, Hale, Hale Barns, Hattersley, Hazel Grove, Heald Green, High Lane, Hyde, Marple, Mossley (part), Partington, Romiley, Sale, Stalybridge, Stockport, Timperley, Woodford Garden Village, Woodley, Wythenshawe
Merseyside	Bebington, Bidston, Birkenhead, Brimstage, Bromborough, Eastham, Greasby, Heswall, Hoylake, Irby, Leasowe, Moreton, New Ferry, Pensby, Port Sunlight, Thingwall, Upton, Wallasey, West Kirby

== Transport ==
=== Railways ===
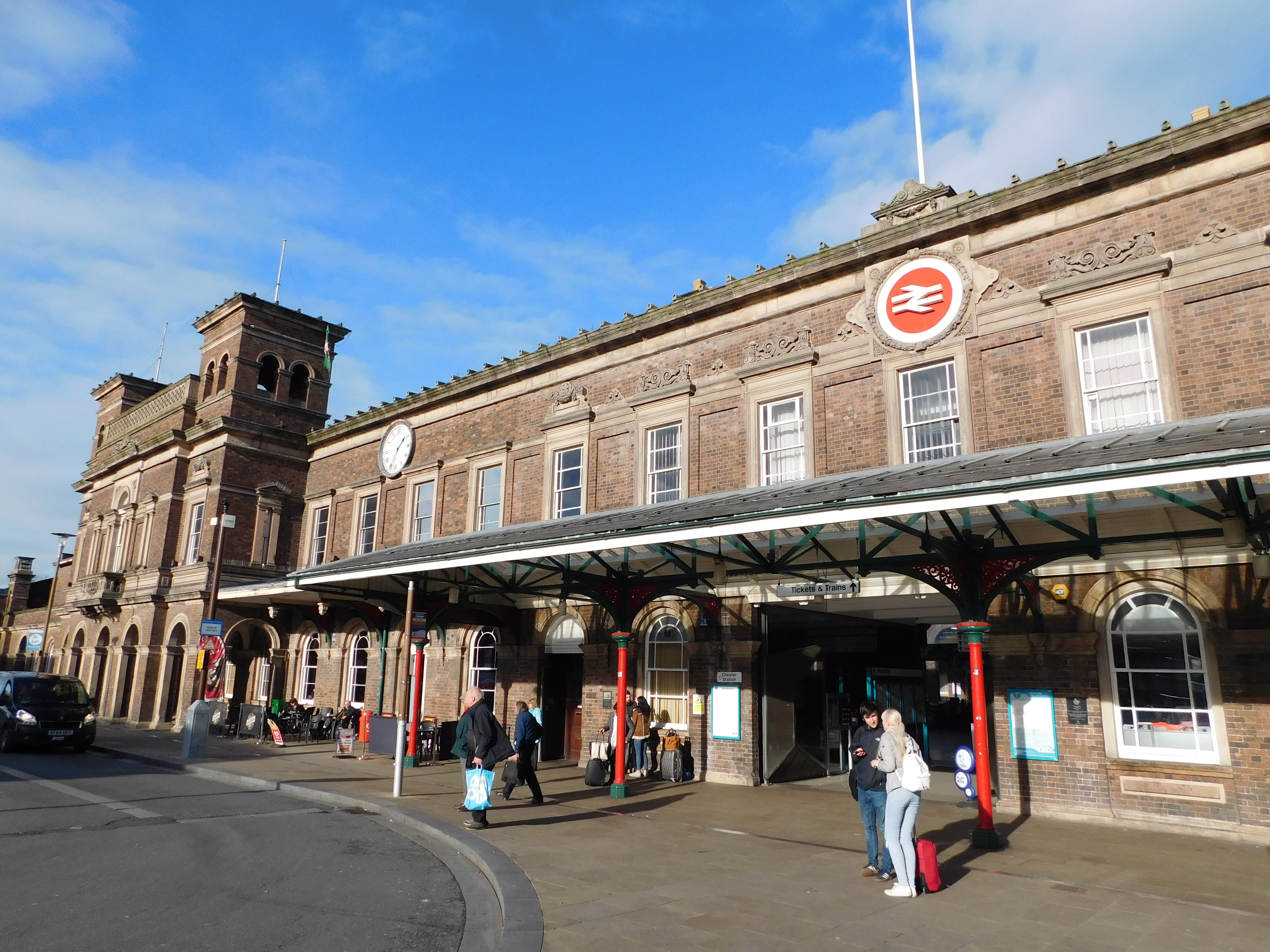
Chester station in November 2017

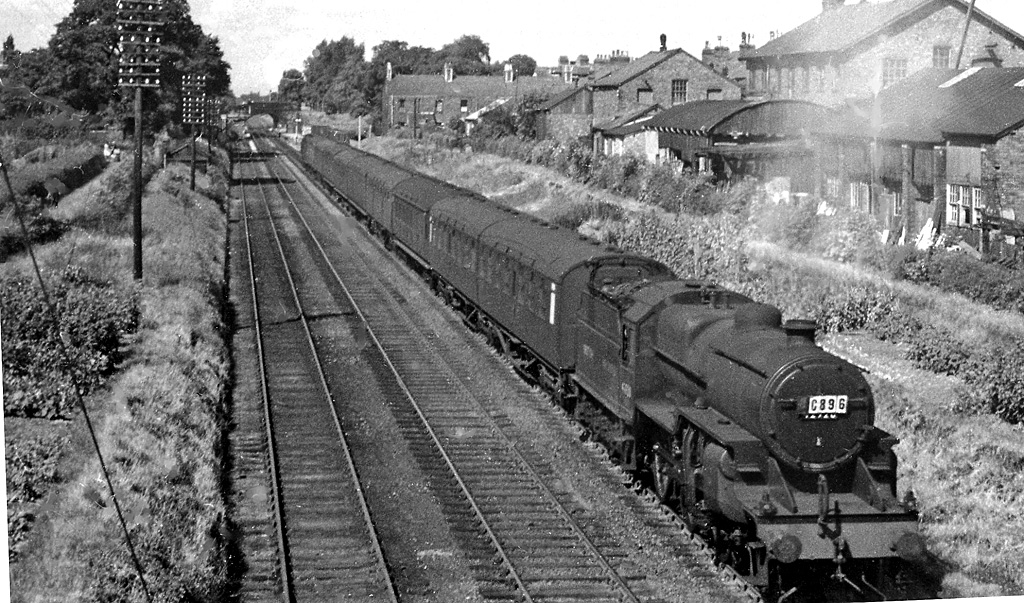
Alderley Edge station in July 1951

The main railway line through the county is the West Coast Main Line. Trains on the main London to Scotland line call at Crewe (in the south of the county) and Warrington Bank Quay (in the north of the county). Trains stop at Crewe and Runcorn on the Liverpool branch of the WCML; Crewe and Macclesfield are each hourly stops on the two Manchester branches. The major interchanges are:

- Crewe (the biggest station in Cheshire) for trains to London Euston, Glasgow Central, Edinburgh Waverley, Manchester Piccadilly and Liverpool Lime Street (via the WCML). Trains on other routes travel to Wales, the Midlands (Birmingham, Stoke and Derby) as well as suburban services to Manchester Piccadilly, Chester and Liverpool Lime Street.
- Warrington stations (Central and Bank Quay) for suburban services to Manchester Piccadilly, Chester and Liverpool Lime Street and regional express services to North Wales, London, Scotland, Yorkshire, the East Coast and the East Midlands
- Chester for urban services (via Merseyrail) to Liverpool Central, suburban services to Manchester, Warrington, Wrexham General and rural Cheshire and express services to Llandudno, Holyhead, Birmingham, the West Midlands, London and Cardiff and, from May 2019, to Leeds.

In the east of Cheshire, Macclesfield station is served by Avanti West Coast, CrossCountry and Northern, on the Manchester–London line. Services from Manchester to the south coast frequently stop at Macclesfield. Neston on the Wirral Peninsula is served by a railway station on the Borderlands line between Bidston and Wrexham.

=== Roadways ===
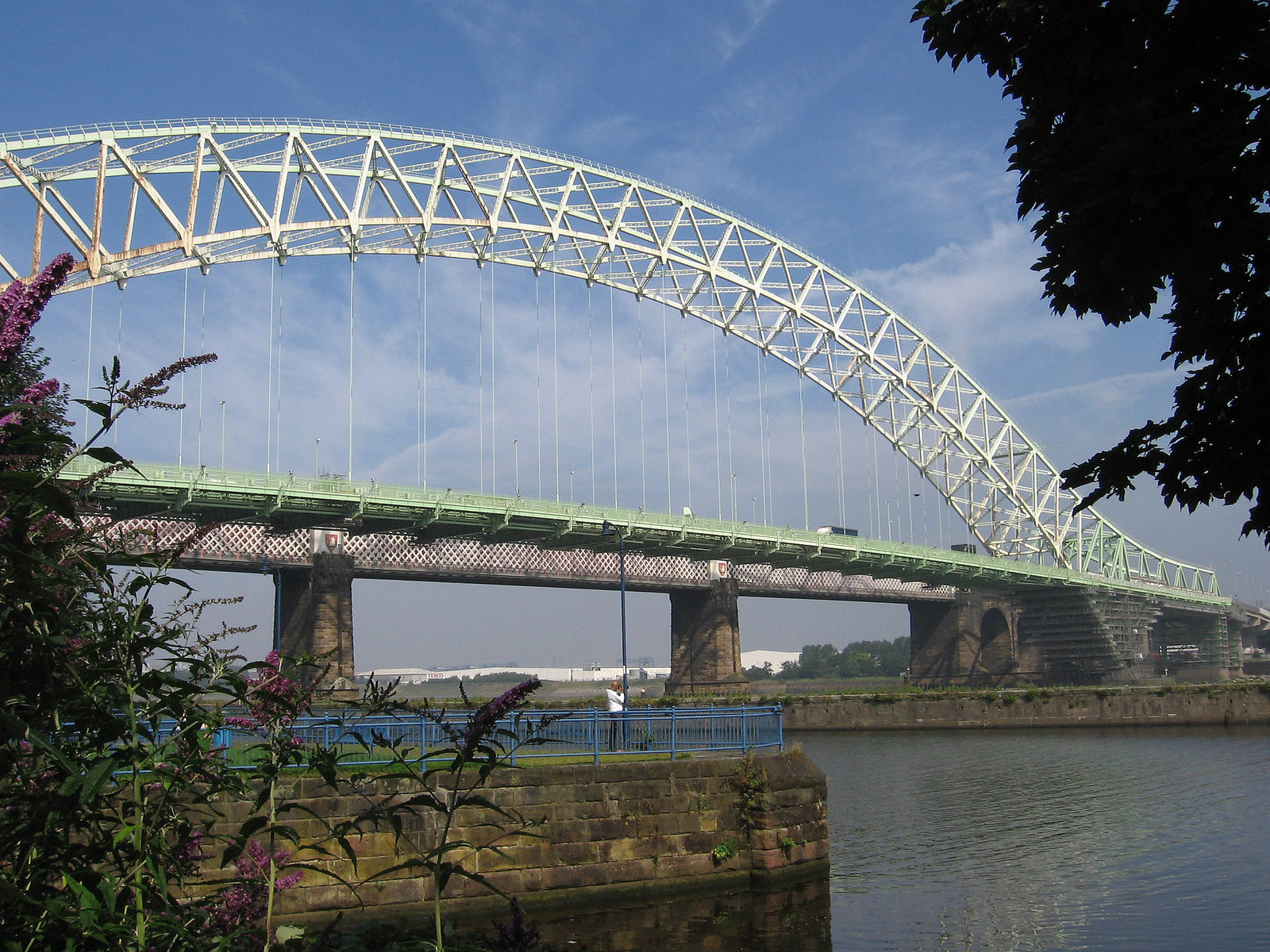
Silver Jubilee Bridge in August 2012

Cheshire has 3,417 miles (5,499 km) of roads, including 214 miles (344 km) of the M6, M62, M53 and M56 motorways; there are 23 interchanges and four service areas. It also has the A580 "East Lancashire Road" at its border with Greater Manchester at Leigh. The M6 motorway at the Thelwall Viaduct carries 140,000 vehicles every 24 hours.

Bus transport in Cheshire is provided by various operators. The major bus operator in the Cheshire area is D&G Bus. Other operators in Cheshire include Stagecoach Chester & Wirral and Warrington's Own Buses.

There are also several operators based outside of Cheshire, who either run services wholly within the area or services which start from outside the area. Companies include Arriva Buses Wales, Aimee's Travel, High Peak, Metroline Manchester, D&G bus and Stagecoach Manchester.

Some services are run under contract to Cheshire West and Chester, Cheshire East, Borough of Halton and Warrington Councils.

=== Waterways ===
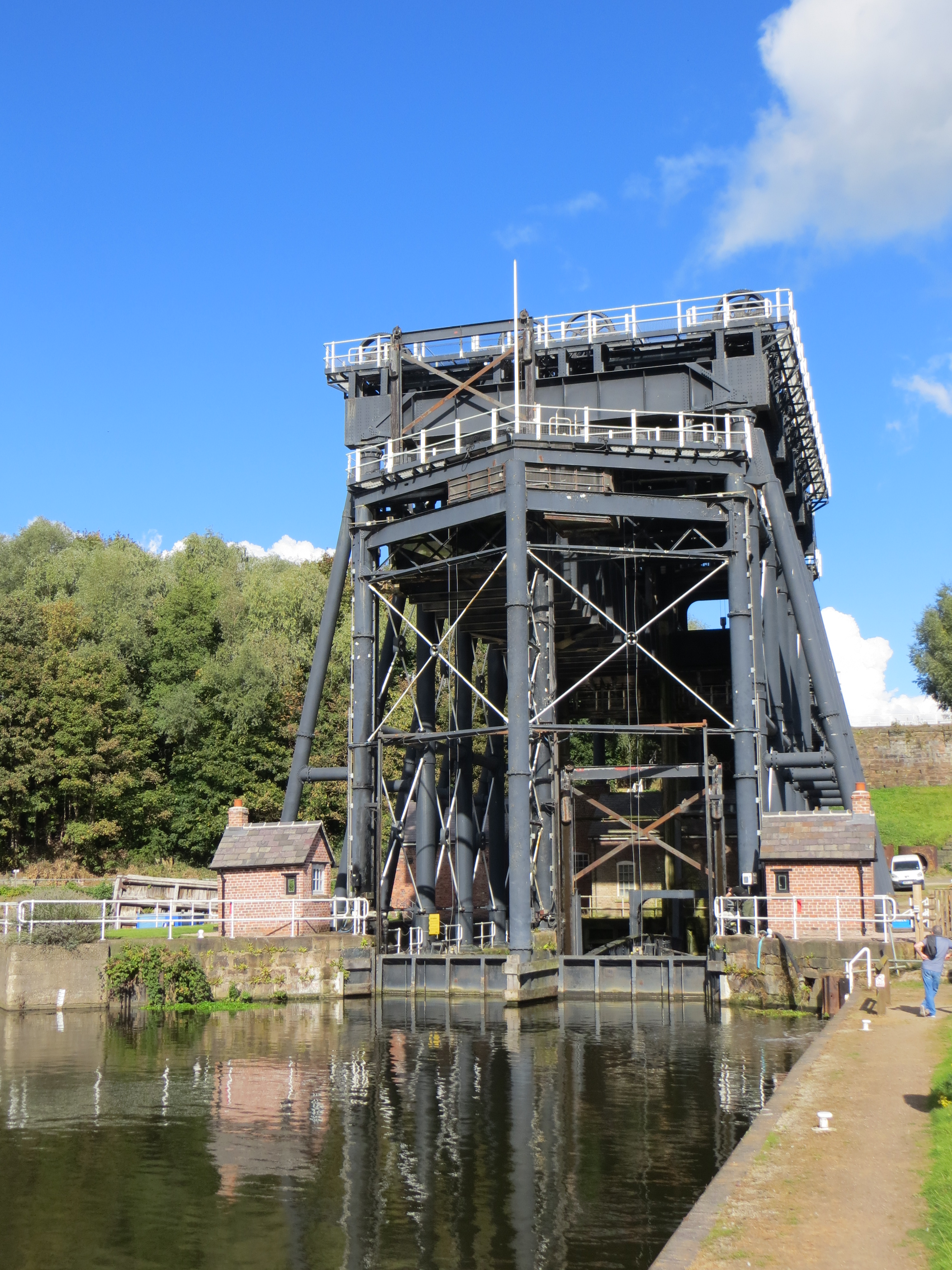
Anderton Boat Lift in October 2016

The Cheshire canal system includes several canals originally used to transport the county's industrial products (mostly chemicals). Nowadays they are mainly used for tourist traffic. The Cheshire Ring is formed from the Rochdale, Ashton, Peak Forest, Macclesfield, Trent and Mersey and Bridgewater canals.

The Manchester Ship Canal is a wide, 36-mile (58 km) stretch of water opened in 1894. It consists of the rivers Irwell and Mersey made navigable to Manchester for seagoing ships leaving the Mersey estuary. The canal passes through the north of the county via Runcorn and Warrington. Rivers and canals in the county are:

- River Bollin
- River Croco
- River Dane
- River Dean
- River Dee / Afon Dyfrdwy
- River Gowy
- River Goyt
- River Mersey
- River Weaver and Weaver Navigation
- River Wheelock
- Bridgewater Canal
- Macclesfield Canal
- Manchester Ship Canal
- Shropshire Union Canal and the Llangollen branch
- Trent and Mersey Canal

== See also ==
- Cheshire (UK Parliament constituency), historical list of MPs for Cheshire constituency
- Constable of Chester
- Custos Rotulorum of Cheshire – Keepers of the Rolls
- Healthcare in Cheshire
- High Sheriff of Cheshire
- Lord Lieutenant of Cheshire
- Outline of England
- List of English and Welsh endowed schools (19th century)#Cheshire

== Bibliography ==
- Crosby, A. (1996). A History of Cheshire. The Darwen County History Series. Chichester, UK: Phillimore & Co ISBN 0-85033-932-4.
- Girls Aloud (2009). Dreams That Glitter. Transworld Publishers Limited. ISBN 978-0-552-15760-5.
- Harris, B. E., and Thacker, A. T. (1987). The Victoria History of the County of Chester. Volume 1: Physique, Prehistory, Roman, Anglo-Saxon, and Domesday. Oxford: Oxford University Press. ISBN 0-19-722761-9.
- Morgan, P. (ed.) (1978). Domesday Book. Volume 26: Cheshire. Chichester, Sussex: Phillmore and Company Limited. ISBN 0-85033-140-4.
- Philip, Neil (1981). A Fine Anger: A Critical Introduction to the Work of Alan Garner. London: Collins. ISBN 978-0-00-195043-6.
- Phillips, A. D. M., and Phillips, C. B. (eds.) (2002). A New Historical Atlas of Cheshire. Chester, UK: Cheshire County Council and Cheshire Community Council Publications Trust. ISBN 0-904532-46-1.
- Shores, Christopher; Franks, Norman; Guest, Russell (1990). Above the Trenches: A Complete Record of the Fighter Aces and Units of the British Empire Air Forces 1915–1920. Grub Street. ISBN 0-948817-19-4, ISBN 978-0-948817-19-9.
- Sylvester, D. (1980) [first ed.: 1971]. A History of Cheshire. Second edition. The Darwen County History Series. London and Chichester, UK: Phillimore & Co. Ltd. ISBN 0-85033-384-9.
