= Hardings Wood Junction =

Canal junction in Staffordshire, England

Coordinates: 53.0883°N 2.2470°W

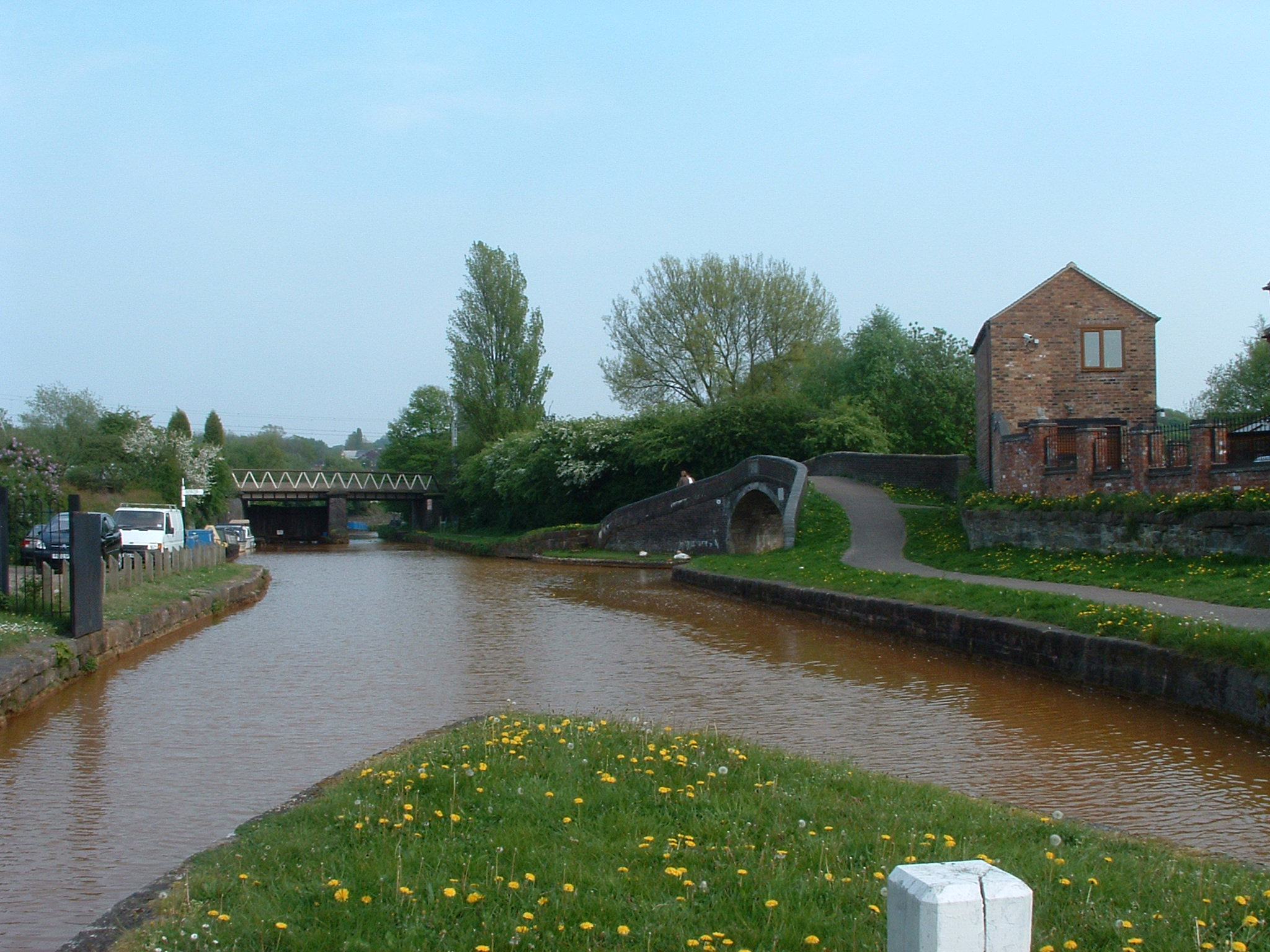
- The junction, viewed from the island between a pair of parallel locks. The Trent and Mersey Canal runs both sides of the camera and ahead. The Macclesfield Canal starts through the side bridge.
- Interactive map of Hardings Wood Junction

Specifications
- Status: open
- Navigation authority: British Waterways

History
- Date completed: 1831

Hardings Wood Junction (grid reference SJ834546) is a canal junction near Kidsgrove, Staffordshire, England and the point at which the Macclesfield Canal (or, historically, the Hall Green Branch) joins the Trent and Mersey Canal. It opened in 1831.

== History ==
The Trent and Mersey Canal was authorised by the Trent and Mersey Canal Act 1766 (6 Geo. 3. c. 96), and construction began at once. After rising through 40 locks from Shardlow on the River Trent, the 93-mile (150 km) canal had a short summit section, most of which was through the 2,897-yard (2,649 m) Harecastle Tunnel, before it began its descent through another 36 locks to reach Preston Brook and the Bridgewater Canal. It was completed in 1777.

From the time of its opening, there were plans for a canal through Macclesfield, but no firm action was taken until 1824. Thomas Telford produced a survey in 1825, and the Macclesfield Canal Act 1826 (7 Geo. 4. c. xxx) was obtained, but although it was based on Telford's design, he did not oversee the work, which was managed by William Crosley. At the same time, Brindley's original tunnel at Harecastle was sinking, and Telford's new tunnel was authorised in 1823, which would be larger than the old one, and would incorporate a towpath. It was slightly longer, at 2,926 yards (2,676 m) but was completed in just over two years, opening on 16 March 1827. The Trent and Mersey were keen to ensure that none of their limited water supply was lost to the Macclesfield Canal, and obtained the Trent and Mersey Canal Act 1827 (7 & 8 Geo. 4. c. lxxxi), which gave them powers to build the first 1.5 miles (2.4 km) of it, to Hall Green Stop Lock. They insisted that the water level of the Macclesfield canal should be maintained 1 foot (0.30 m) higher than their section, which was known as the Hall Green Branch, so that water passed from the Macclesfield Canal, rather than to it. The canal, and hence the junction, opened in 1831.

== Location ==
The junction lies close to the northern portal of the Harecastle Tunnel. The Trent and Mersey Canal turns to the west after leaving the tunnel, and the Hall Green Branch initially turns off to the south. There is a sharp right-hand bend, after which it runs parallel to the main line, which descends through two locks. There is then another sharp right-hand bend, and the branch crosses over the main line on an aqueduct. The Macclesfield Canal is 26.1 miles (42.0 km) long from the stop lock to Marple Junction, and ascends through a single flight of 12 locks, located 9 miles (14 km) from the stop lock. Since both canals are now managed by British Waterways, the Hall Green Branch is usually considered to be part of the Macclesfield Canal. The summit level of the Trent and Mersey is 5.5 miles (8.9 km) long, and ends close to the junction at lock 41. Travelling south, the other end of the summit is at lock 40, just after Etruria Junction, where the Caldon Canal joins the main line.

== See also ==
- Canals of the United Kingdom
- History of the British canal system

== Bibliography ==
- Cumberlidge, Jane (2009). Inland Waterways of Great Britain (8th Ed.). Imray Laurie Norie and Wilson. ISBN 978-1-84623-010-3.
- Hadfield, Charles (1985). The Canals of the West Midlands. David and Charles. ISBN 0-7153-8644-1.
- Nicholson (2006). Nicholson Guide Vol 5 - North West & the Pennines. Harper Collins. ISBN 978-0-00-721113-5.
