= Crick Boat Show =

Boat show in Northamptonshire, England

Coordinates: 52°21′05″N 01°07′30″W

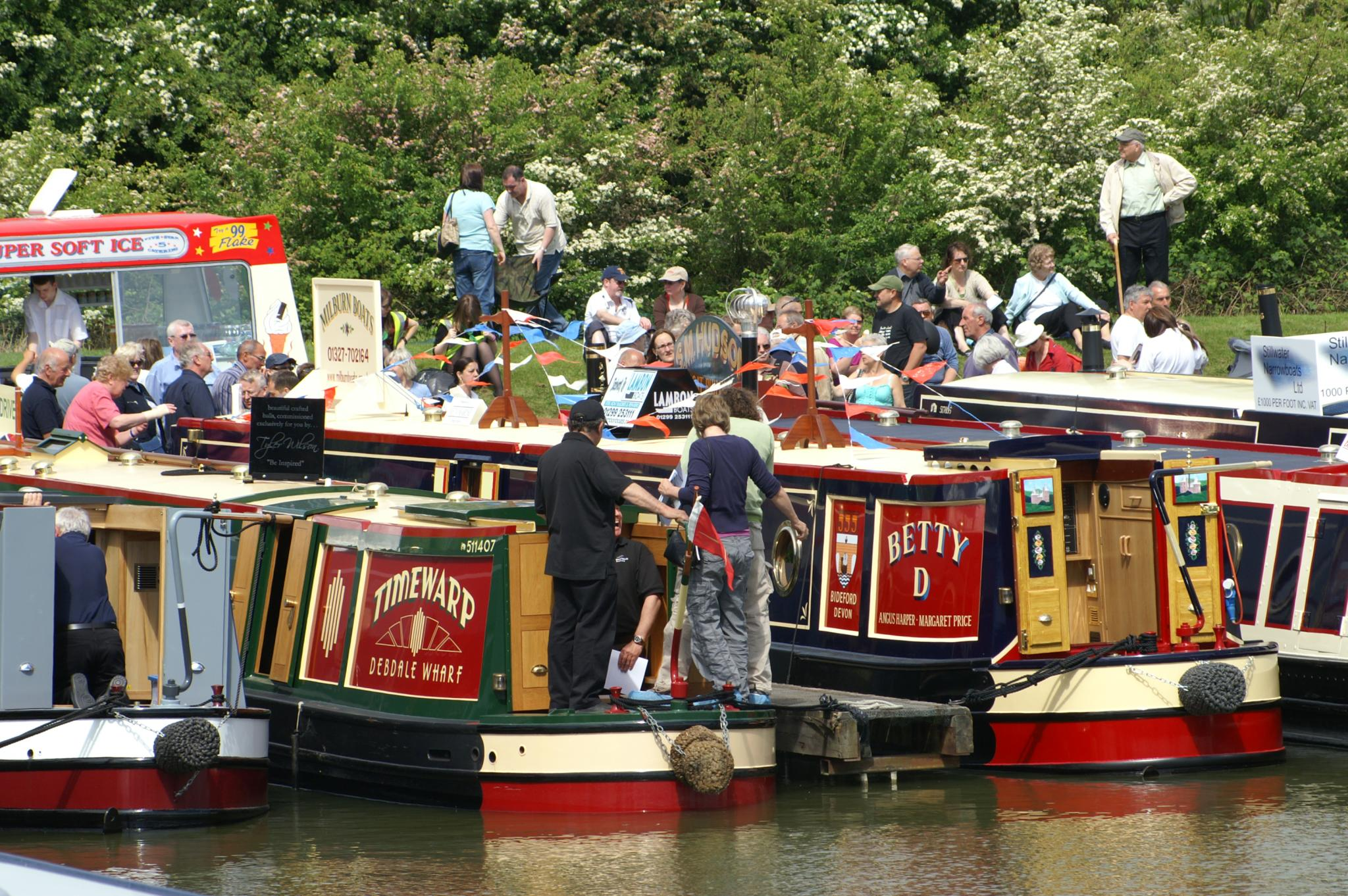
Crick Boat Show

The Crick Boat Show & Waterways Festival is an event that has been held annually at Crick Marina in Northamptonshire, England, since its inception in 2000.

== Location ==
The show takes place every year on the Grand Union Canal at Crick Marina. This is located on the Leicester Line, to the north of Crick Tunnel, on the level section of canal between the tops of the Watford flight and the Foxton flight. The site is close to junction 18 on the M1, and the event has traditionally taken place on the last bank holiday weekend in May.

== Facilities ==
The show was first held in 2000, when it was organised by British Waterways, and has been held every year since then. Responsibility for its organisation was passed to Waterways World Magazine in 2011, where it has remained ever since in partnership with the Canal & River Trust and Crick Marina.

The event is the focal point of the inland boating calendar and provides the opportunity for boat-builders and sellers to promote new and second-hand boats to visitors considering buying a boat. Every conceivable type of product and service for canal boats is represented by the exhibitors, ranging from equipment to finance and insurance. In a dedicated lecture theatre, a series of free seminars are held throughout the event, covering such topics as boat maintenance, living afloat and boat-buying on a budget.

Free boat-trips along the Grand Union Canal are provided – but must be booked upon arrival at the show – and boat-handling courses are available for an additional fee.

The event is also billed as a 'Waterways Festival', with continuous live music, a large beer festival (organised by The Wheatsheaf public house from the local village) with up to 40 real ales, food and crafts stalls and a range of children's activities broadening its appeal. The live music has included headline performances by recording artists such as Toyah Willcox (2014), Hazel O'Connor (2015) and Tom Robinson (2016), but also features well-known tribute acts such as T-Rextasy (2017) and Abba Revival (2018).

The 2017 show was attended by 27,000-plus people and included around 40 'boats on show' among nearly 200 exhibitors.

== Favourite Boat in Show Award ==
A well established tradition of the event is the 'Favourite Boat in Show' award, which is voted for by show visitors and presented to the winner on the Monday. The visitors' choice for the most admired narrowboat in 2019 was Two Hoots by Boating Leisure Services. The widebeam that attracted the most votes is 70ft Brigantine by Finesse Boats.

Previous winners are as follows:

2018

- Narrowboat: Braidbar Boats Elizabeth Ann a 66ft 6in traditional style hybrid boat.
- Widebeam: Burscough Boats What's The Hurry

2017

- Narrowboat: Bourne Boat Builders Threpence Ha'Penny
- Widebeam: Elton Moss Boatbuilders Kingsley

2016

- Boating Leisure Services Silver Melody: a 58 ft semi-trad narrowboat with a bright interior.

2015

- Boating Leisure Services Columbus: a 60 ft Josher tug-style traditional narrowboat with an oak interior.

2014

- Boating Leisure Services Shackleton: a 58 ft semi-trad narrowboat contrasting a fairly traditional exterior with a bright modern interior.

2013

- Navigations Narrowboats Emily: a 58 ft tug-style narrowboat with a Tyler Wilson shell.

2012

- MGM Boats Snail's Pace: a 58 ft cruiser-stern, reverse layout narrowboat that had been custom built for its owners.

2011

- William Piper Narrowboats Barolo 59ft semi-trad narrowboat with a Tim Tyler shell.

2007

- Braidbar Boats Braidbar 100

2000

- Braidbar Boats Rhiannon

== See also ==
- Canals of the United Kingdom
- History of the British canal system

== Bibliography ==
- Langley, Mark; Smedley, Rupert (August 2012). "Crick Boat Show Review". Waterways World. ISSN 0309-1422.
- Cumberlidge, Jane (2009). Inland Waterways of Great Britain (8th Ed.). Imray Laurie Norie and Wilson. ISBN 978-1-84623-010-3.
