= Braidbar Boats =

Boatbuilder in Poynton, Cheshire, England

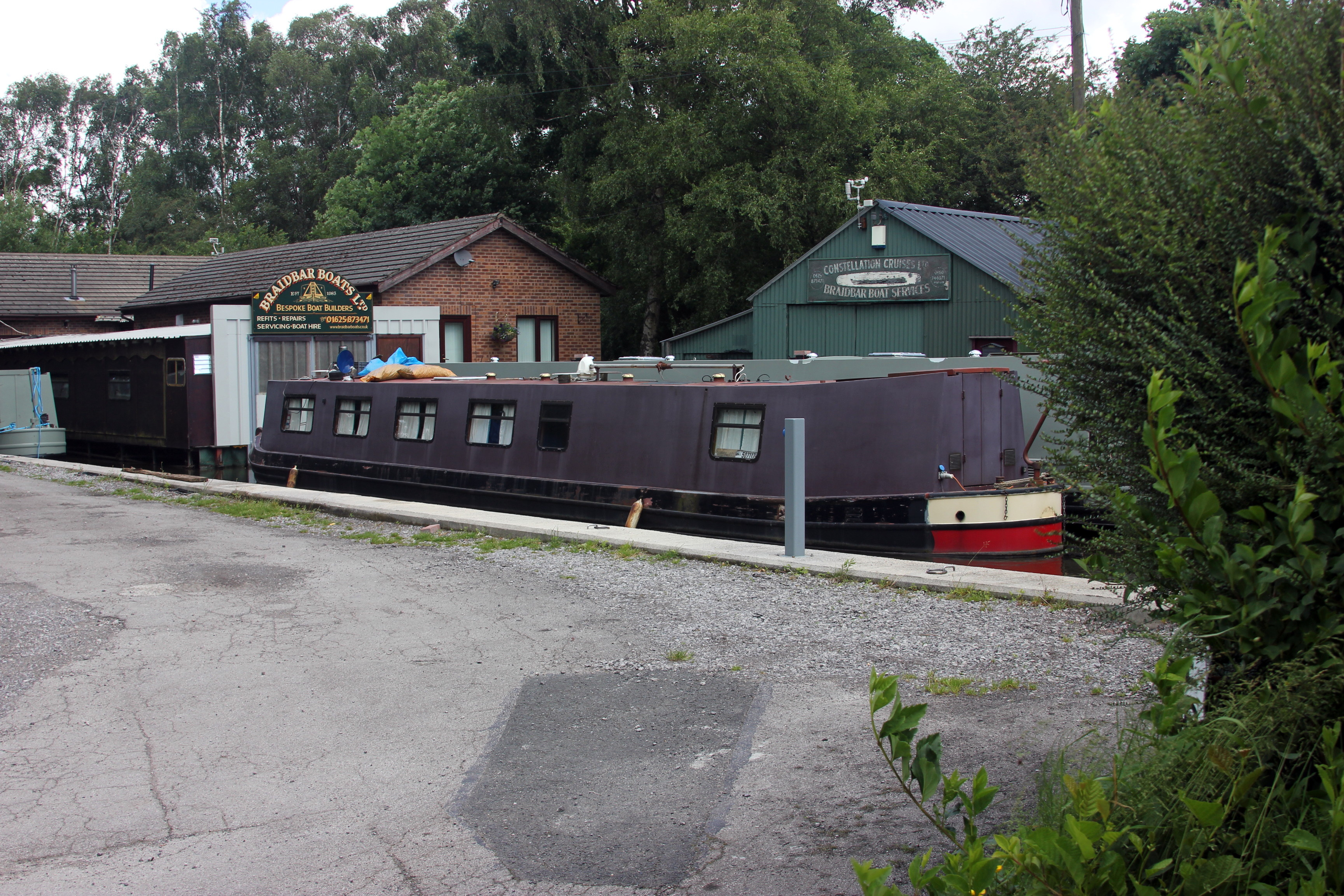
- The boat yard at Lord Vernon’s Wharf
- Company type: Private
- Industry: Boat building
- Founded: 1983
- Headquarters: Poynton, Cheshire, England
- Products: Narrowboats
- Website: braidbarboats.co.uk

Braidbar Boats are a narrowboat building company based at Lord Vernon’s Wharf on the Macclesfield Canal at Poynton, Cheshire.

== History ==
In 1983 Braidbar Boats was established as a narrowboat building business in Lord Vernon’s Wharf on the Macclesfield Canal at Poynton, Cheshire. The company produces around 7 quality narrowboats each year and has won many awards, including Favourite Boat in Show at the Crick Boat Show in 2000, 2007 and 2018.

== Lord Vernon’s Wharf ==
Lord Vernon’s Wharf was constructed as a short arm to the Macclesfield Canal in 1831 shortly after the canal was completed for use by the Poynton Collieries which was owned by the Baron Vernon from 1832 until 1935. In the late 1950s the site was used by Constellation Cruises who started with a 70ft boat which had 7-8 berths.
