= Marple Junction =

Canal junction in Greater Manchester, England

Coordinates: 53.3925°N 2.0593°W

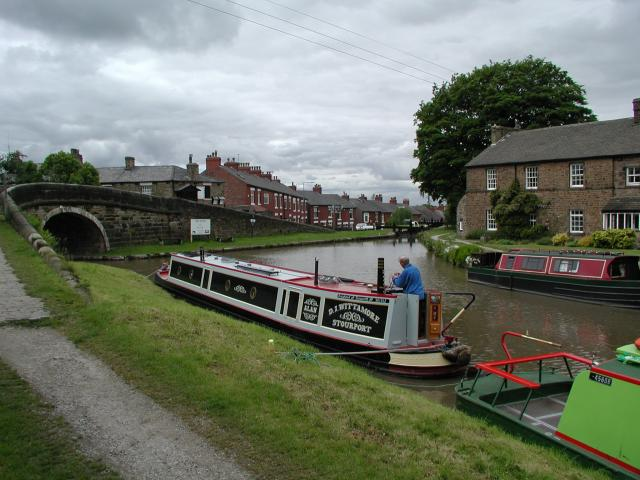
- Marple Junction, looking north-north-west

Specifications
- Status: Open
- Navigation authority: Canal & River Trust

History
- Date completed: 1831
- Date closed: 1939
- Date restored: 1974

Marple Junction (grid reference SJ961884) is the name of the canal junction where the Macclesfield Canal terminates and meets the Peak Forest Canal at Marple, Greater Manchester, England.

The water of the two canal companies was kept apart by a stop lock in the narrows at the end of the later Macclesfield Canal, but this has long since been de-gated and the two canals run at the same level.

== History ==
The Peak Forest Canal was authorised by an Act of Parliament obtained in 1794, which was designed to access the limestone deposits at Doveholes, near Whaley Bridge. The canal ran from Dukinfield Junction on the Ashton Canal to Bugsworth Basin, from where a tramway ran the final 6.5 miles (10.5 km) to the quarries, which were over 1,000 feet (300 m) above sea level. There were two level pounds on the canal, separated by a flight of 16 locks which raised the level by 214 feet (65 m). Most of the canal opened in 1800, but the locks were not completed until 1804 and a second tramway was used to bypass the locks until they were ready.

Although a route through Macclesfield to connect the Trent and Mersey Canal to Manchester had been suggested as early as 1777, an Act of Parliament was not obtained until 1826, following a survey by Thomas Telford. The canal opened on 9 November 1831, and like the Peak Forest, was built as two level sections, with a flight of locks between them, in this case the twelve Bosley locks, which raise the level by 118 feet (36 m). The junction with the Peak Forest Canal is just above the top lock of the Marple flight.

The limestone traffic on the upper Peak Forest Canal ceased in 1922 and the upper section gradually became unusable. The lower canal was also disused by 1939. Following determined efforts by the Peak Forest Canal Society, the Inland Waterways Association, the British Waterways Board and the local authorities (through whose regions the canals ran), both the Peak Forest and Ashton Canals were reopened in 1974; this provided Marple Junction with its connection to the national network. With the reopening, the junction was again operational.

== Location ==
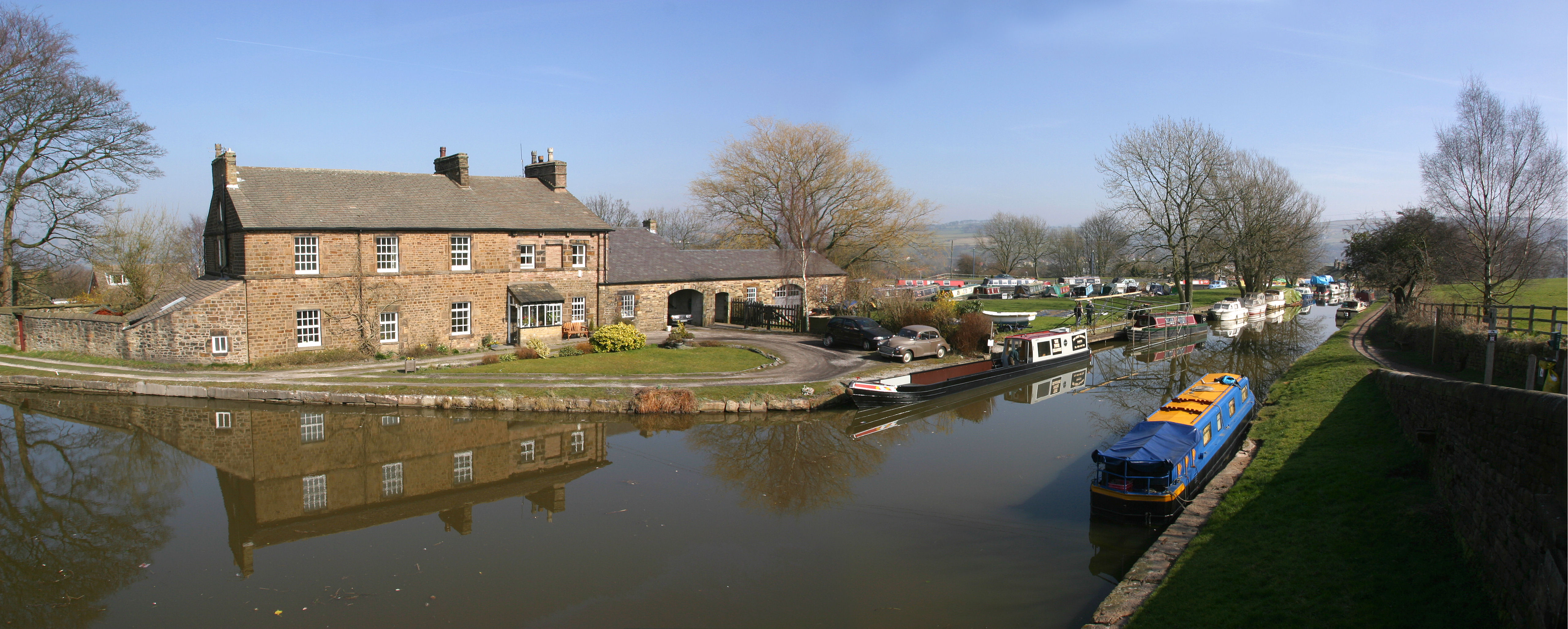

The top lock of the Marple flight is immediately to the north of the junction. From the bottom of the locks, the canal passes through Hyde Bank Tunnel and Woodley Tunnel to reach Dukinfield Junction, 8 miles (13 km) away. To the south-east, the canal is level for 6.7 miles (10.8 km) to its terminus at Bugsworth Basin, which has been restored by the Inland Waterways Protection Society.

The Macclesfield Canal initially heads south-west before turning to the south. A footbridge carries the towpath from the west bank of the Peak Forest Canal to the south bank by the junction, but it very quickly crosses back to the western bank of the Macclesfield Canal at Church Lane Bridge. The canal is level for 16.1 miles (25.9 km) to the top of the Bosley flight and continues on to reach Hall Green stop lock, its junction with the Trent and Mersey Canal, at 26.1 miles (42.0 km).

The whole of the canal is a designated conservation area, following action by Macclesfield Borough Council in June 1975, as a response to a policy document entitled Recreational Framework for Britain's Canals.

== See also ==
- Canals of the United Kingdom
- History of the British canal system

== Bibliography ==
- Cumberlidge, Jane (2009). Inland Waterways of Great Britain (8th Ed.). Imray Laurie Norie and Wilson. ISBN 978-1-84623-010-3.
- Hadfield, Charles (1985). The Canals of the West Midlands. David and Charles. ISBN 0-7153-8644-1.
- Nicholson (2006). Nicholson Guides Vol 5: North West & the Pennines. Harper Collins. ISBN 978-0-00-721113-5.
- Squires, Roger (2008). Britain's restored canals. Landmark Publishing. ISBN 978-1-84306-331-5.
