= Hall Green Branch =

Canal in east Cheshire

Coordinates: 53.0891°N 2.2476°W

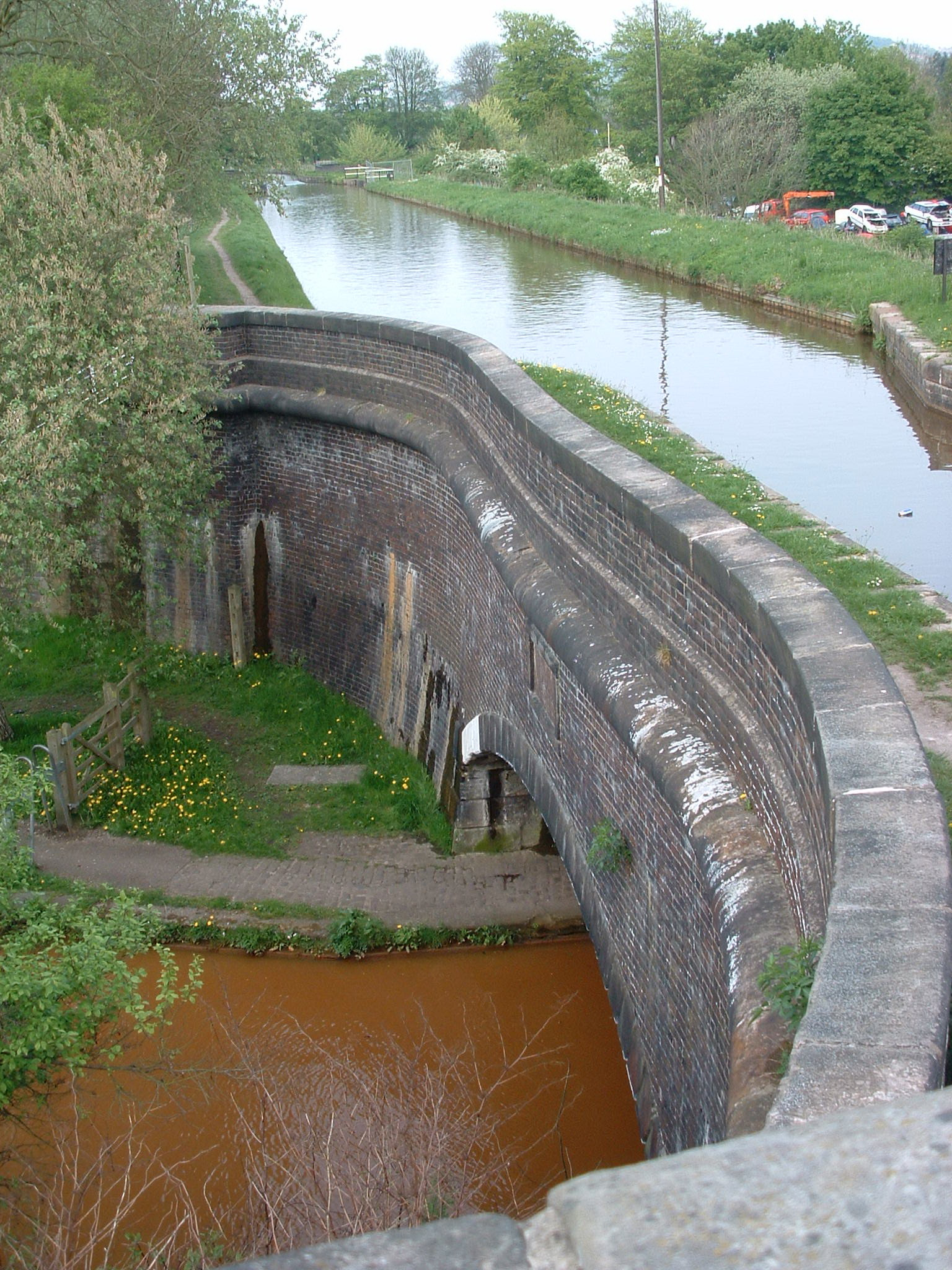
Hall Green Branch canal crosses the Trent and Mersey near Poole Lock

The Hall Green Branch of the Trent and Mersey Canal is a canal in east Cheshire, England. It runs for one mile from Kidsgrove to Hall Green, where it makes an end-on junction with the Macclesfield Canal at Hall Green Stop Lock.

== History ==
The Macclesfield Canal had been authorised by an act of Parliament, the Macclesfield Canal Act 1826 (7 Geo. 4. c. xxx), obtained on 11 April 1826, but the Trent and Mersey Canal had managed to get a clause inserted into the act that required them to build the final mile (1.6 km) of the route. It also enabled them to charge tolls for use of the final section, and to receive all surplus water from the Macclesfield Canal. Work began on construction in 1827, and on 20 March 1829 the engineer Thomas Telford wrote to the Trent and Mersey Company, following an inspection he had made of Knypersley Reservoir, Harecastle Tunnel and the Hall Green Branch. While generally pleased with the standard of the work on the branch, he was not happy with the use of "dense blue clunch", which had been laid on top of the puddle clay. He requested that it be removed, and a covering of gravel used instead.

Part of the route was affected by water ingress, and the resident engineer suggested that the bed should be lined with stone slabs before the puddle clay was applied. Telford advised against this, but there were persistent problems with the water dislodging the clay, and eventually, some 7 yards (6.4 m) of the canal was lined with stone, placed on top of the puddle clay. Water still seeped up between the stones, but did not bring the underlying sand with it, and so the canal remained watertight. The Macclesfield Canal opened throughout on 9 November 1831, and the Hall Green Branch was used from that date.

Whilst originally built by the Trent and Mersey Canal Company, the branch is often considered as part of the Macclesfield Canal in modern maps and guidebooks. The bridges on the branch are numbered from 94 to 98, following on from bridge 93, the final bridge before the stop lock on the Macclesfield Canal. The Macclesfield Canal seem to have treated it as such almost from the start, since their annual meeting held on 18 July 1833 reported that the company had built six wharves, and was in the process of building a seventh at Bosley. One of the original six was at Hardings Wood, close to the final junction with the Trent and Mersey main line.

At Poole Lock aqueduct, the canal crosses over the Trent and Mersey Canal main line, which it joins, after a further 0.5 miles (0.8 km), at Harding Junction. This junction is about 0.75 miles (1.2 km) from the northern portal of Harecastle Tunnel.

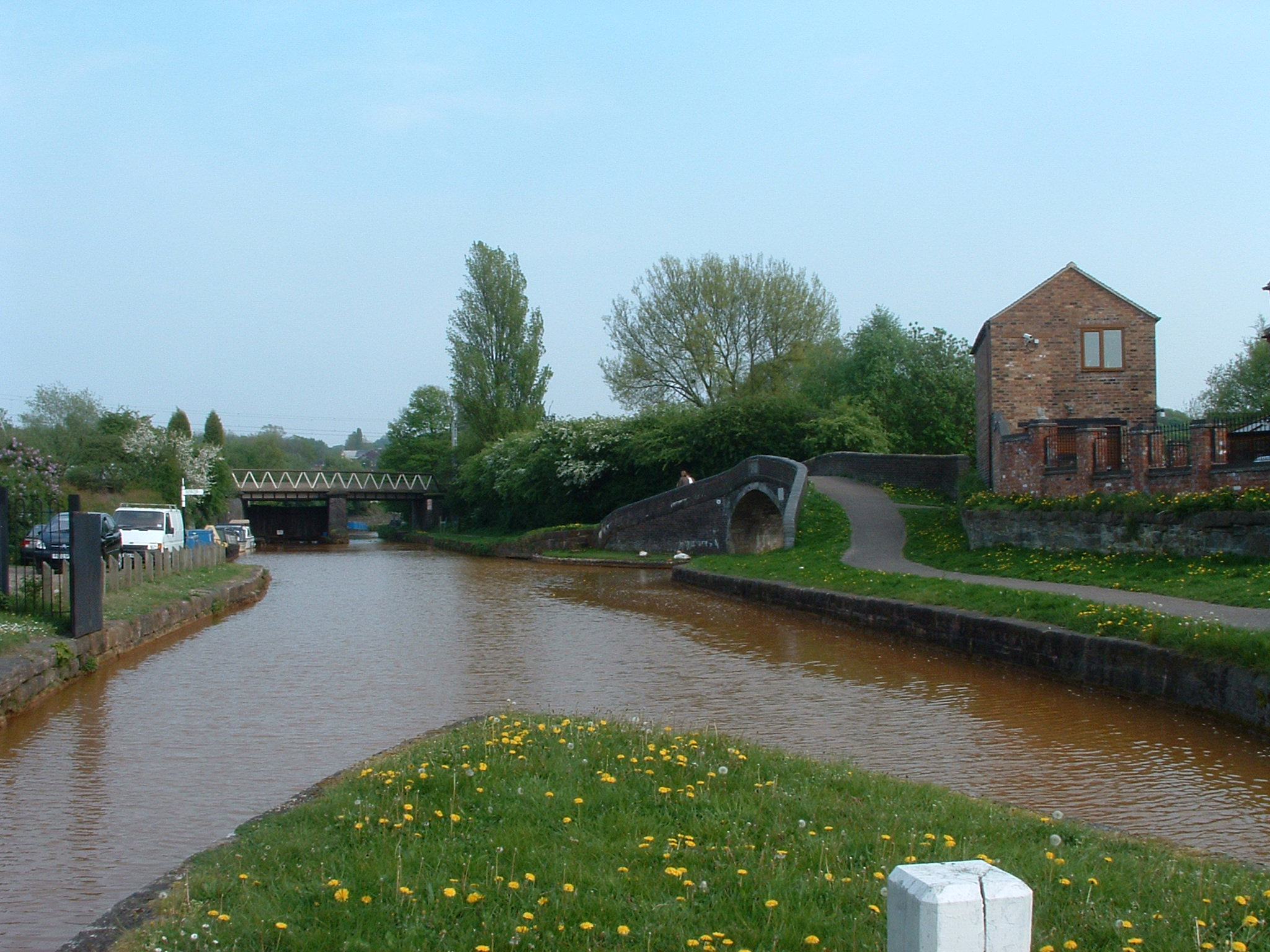
Harding Junction - southern end of the Hall Green Branch (through side bridge)

== Hall Green Stop Lock ==
The stop lock at Hall Green, which has a 12-inch (30 cm) fall from the Macclesfield to the T&M, was originally built as two chambers end to end, to allow for either canal to be higher. The second chamber fell into disuse when the weir level on the top pound of the Trent and Mersey Canal was permanently lowered after nationalisation to improve the clearance in Harecastle Tunnel.

Whilst the fall of the lock is small, it cannot be taken out of use (as many stop locks have), because lowering the bottom pound of the Macclesfield Canal would lead to draft problems on it (as it is a fairly shallow canal), and raising the top pound of the Trent and Mersey would lead to air draft problems through Harecastle tunnel. Indeed, as Harecastle continues to sink, the weir level may be lowered further, leading to an increased fall at this lock.

== See also ==
- Canals of the United Kingdom
- History of the British canal system

== Bibliography ==
- Cousins, Graham (2002a). "Macclesfield Canal construction". The Railway & Canal Historical Society.
- Cousins, Graham (2002b). "Macclesfield Canal benefits". The Railway & Canal Historical Society.
- Gilman, H J (1992). The Macclesfield Canal. M G Publications. ISBN 978-0-9518608-0-9.
- Nicholson (2006). Nicholson Waterways Guide (Vol 5): North West and the Pennines. Harper Collins. ISBN 978-0-00-721113-5.
