= Macclesfield Canal =

Canal in Cheshire, England

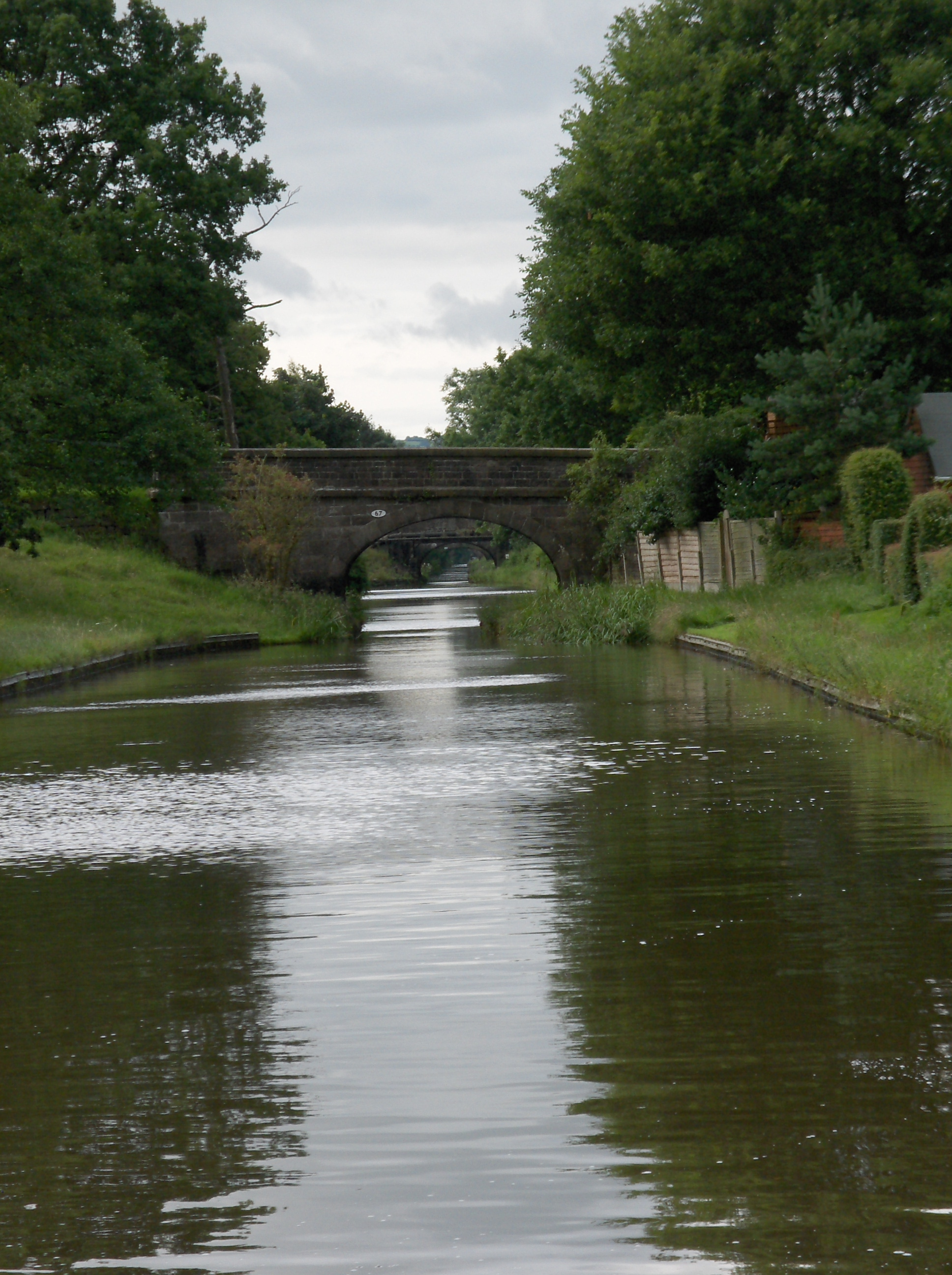
- The canal near Congleton

Specifications
- Maximum boat length: 72 ft 0 in (21.95 m)
- Maximum boat beam: 7 ft 0 in (2.13 m)
- Locks: 13
- Status: Navigable
- Navigation authority: Canal & River Trust

History
- Original owner: Macclesfield Canal Company (est. 1817)
- Principal engineer: Thomas Telford
- Other engineer: William Crosley
- Date of act: 1826
- Construction began: 1826
- Date completed: 1831

Geography
- Start point: Marple Junction
- End point: Hall Green (The final section to Hardings Wood Junction was built as part of the Trent and Mersey Canal)
- Connects to: Peak Forest Canal; Trent and Mersey Canal

The Macclesfield Canal is a canal in Cheshire East, England. There were various proposals for a canal to connect the town of Macclesfield to the national network from 1765 onwards, but it was not until 1824 that a scheme came to fruition. There were already suggestions by that date that a railway would be better, but the committee that had been formed elected for a canal and the engineer Thomas Telford endorsed the decision. The canal as built was a typical Telford canal, constructed using cut and fill, with numerous cuttings and embankments to enable it to follow as straight a course as possible, although Telford had little to do with its construction, which was managed by William Crosley.

The canal opened in 1831 and is 26.1 miles (42.0 km) long. All of its twelve locks are concentrated in a single flight at Bosley, which alters the level by 118 feet (36 m). The canal runs from a junction with the Peak Forest Canal at Marple in the north, in a generally southerly direction, through the towns of Macclesfield and Congleton, to an end-on junction with the Hall Green Branch of the Trent and Mersey Canal. There is a stop lock at the junction, which drops the level by 1 foot (0.30 m), and the branch runs for another 1.5 miles (2.4 km) to Hardings Wood Junction, where it joins the Trent and Mersey main line. This short branch is usually considered to be part of the Macclesfield Canal in modern literature.

Faced with growing threats from railways and the fact that the Trent and Mersey was proposing to merge with a railway company, the management did all they could to cut costs. In 1846, they reached an agreement to sell the canal to a railway company, which became the Manchester, Sheffield and Lincolnshire Railway soon afterwards. Under railway ownership, the canal fared better than many and commercial carrying continued until 1954. There had been some leisure use of the canal since the end of the First World War and the North Cheshire Cruising Club, formed in 1943 and based at the High Lane arm, became the first such cruising club on the British inland waterways. There were dangers that the northern end would be isolated under plans to close the Ashton Canal and the lower Peak Forest Canal in the early 1960s, but vigorous campaigning and a growing restoration movement resulted in the Transport Act 1968, which secured the future of those canals. The designation of the canal as part of the Cheshire Ring in 1965 was part of the strategy by the Inland Waterways Association to promote the leisure potential of canals.

The whole canal was designated as a Conservation Area by Macclesfield Borough Council in 1975 and a large number of its structures have been Grade II listed in recognition of their historic importance. This includes a number of elegant roving bridges, which are known locally as snake bridges. Much of the canal is rural, passing through open countryside, and there are a number of impressive embankments and aqueducts, where the canal crosses river valleys. In the centres of population, there are several large mills that were once served by the canal but are now repurposed as small industrial units or apartments.

== Route ==
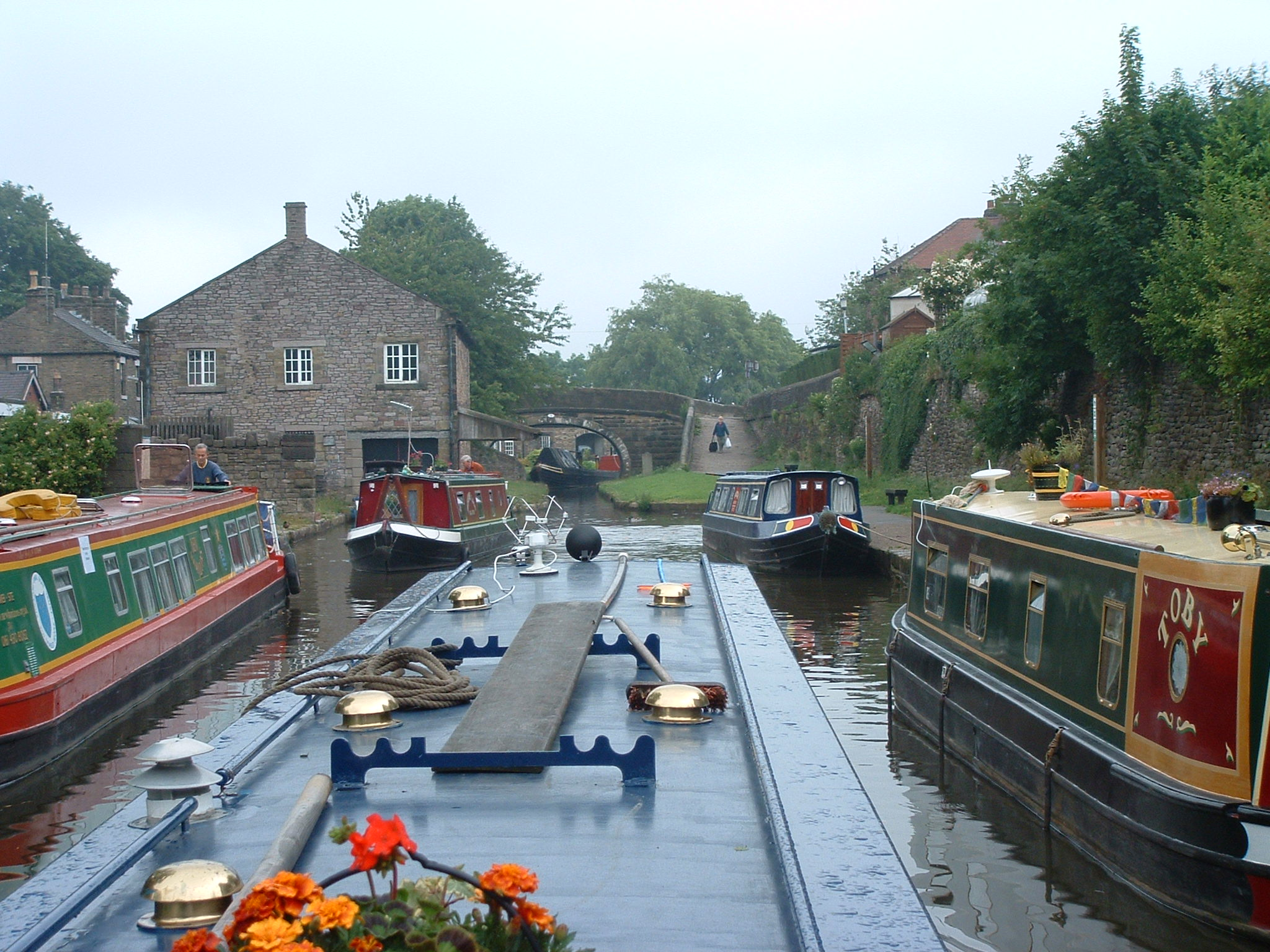
Macclesfield Canal just before Marple Junction

The canal runs for 26.1 miles (42 km) in a generally north to south direction from Marple Junction at Marple, where it joins the Upper Peak Forest Canal, to a junction with the Hall Green Branch of the Trent and Mersey Canal at Hall Green stop lock. The canal runs along the edge of a tall ridge of hills, to the west of the Pennines, and was built using Telford's "cut and fill" approach, following as straight a course as possible, with many cuttings and embankments constructed to achieve this, rather than the earlier approach of following the contours. It is a narrow canal, designed for boats with a maximum length of 72 feet (22 m) and a width of 7 feet (2.1 m).

It joins the Peak Forest Canal on the eastern edge of Marple, at the top of a flight of 16 locks that raise the lower Peak Forest by 214 feet (65 m) to join the upper section. There was once a Stop Lock at Marple, although both canals were built to the same level, and the lock was provided only for cases where water shortages might have resulted in a temporary difference. The lock has long been de-gated, having become unnecessary once the Macclesfield and Peak Forest canals came into common ownership. The site of the lock remains as a narrows just in front of the junction bridge, and is overlooked by a canal warehouse with two storeys, built in 1835. It has a rectangular plan, and includes an internal waterway.

As the canal reaches Hawk Green, just to the south of Marple, a huge mill with six storeys is situated on the east bank. Goyt Mill was built in 1905, and now houses over 50 small businesses. At High Lane, the canal passes through the centre of the village, and the High Lane Branch, which is used as moorings for the North Cheshire Cruising Club, is to the west of the canal. A tall aqueduct carries the canal over a railway line, and beyond it is a large embankment. The next section is isolated and rural, with the canal following the contours, but the route crosses a number of valleys where there are embankments and aqueducts. Near Higher Poynton, the canal is wider, as it has suffered from subsidence from a nearby coal mine, which resulted in the banks and bridges being raised on several occasions. The Peak District Boundary Walk runs along the towpath for about 1 mile near Lyme View Marina.

On the outskirts of Bollington, the canal passes Clarence Mill, another huge building which now houses small industrial units. Two aqueducts and a 60-foot (18 m) embankment carry the canal over the valley of the River Dean and into Bollington. Adelphi Mill is on the west bank at the southern edge of Bollington, and was once a silk mill. It has been converted for use as offices. After another rural section, the canal enters Macclesfield. Hovis Mill, where the famous flour was originally milled, is on the west bank. It was built in the 1820s, and has been converted into apartments. A branch of the canal formerly led into the complex, but only its blocked up entrance remains. Near Gurnett Aqueduct, which carries the canal over the road to Gurnett and the River Bollin, is a cottage with a plaque to commemorate the civil engineer and canal builder James Brindley. He served an apprenticeship to Abraham Bennett between 1733 and 1740 there.

Beyond, the canal resumes its rural course as it follows the contours towards Bosley Lock Flight. To the east is Sutton Reservoir, which draws its water supply from springs to the east, and holds some 94 million imperial gallons (430 Ml) of water to supply the canal. It provides opportunities for walking and picnicking. Just before the first lock is a short branch to the east, which gives access to facilities for boaters. It is actually the widened end of the feeder from Bosley Reservoir, the first to be built to supply the canal, which is located some distance to the south east. The top lock is 16.1 miles (25.9 km) from the Peak Forest Canal. The twelve locks of the flight drop the level of the canal by 118 feet (36 m), and they are squeezed together in around 1 mile (1.6 km). Whereas narrow locks on most canals have a single gate at the upper end, these all have twin mitred gates at both ends. Below the bottom lock, a fine aqueduct carries the canal over the River Dane.

The canal heads towards the west before turning to the south again at Buglawton. In Congleton, it crosses the Dane in Shaw Brook, from which a good view of the tall viaduct that carries the railway across the valley can be had. A branch line formerly passed under an aqueduct, beyond which the canal runs along the top of a large embankment. To the east is The Cloud, a large hill over 1,000 feet (300 m) high with ancient earthworks at the top. In Congleton the canal passes over an aqueduct designed by Thomas Telford. South of Congleton, the canal passes through open countryside in a fairly straight course, to reach Scholar Green and the hamlet of Hall Green, where a stop lock indicates the official junction with the Trent and Mersey Hall Green Branch. The branch continues for another 1.5 miles (2.4 km), crossing over the Trent and Mersey main line, and then turning to the east, to join the main line at Hardings Wood Junction near Kidsgrove, after lock 41 and before the Harecastle Tunnel. Since both canals have been in common ownership, this final section is often treated as part of the Macclesfield Canal, and the numbering of bridges 94 to 98, which are all on the Trent and Mersey section, follows on from bridge 93, the final bridge on the Macclesfield Canal.

The canal forms part of the Cheshire Ring cruising route. This term was first used by the Inland Waterways Association in 1965, when they initiated a campaign to ensure that all of the waterways that comprised the Peak Forest circular route should be retained. It was in response to the threat of complete closure of the Rochdale Canal, of which just a mile (1.6 km) is used to complete the circuit. At the launch of the campaign in July 1965, it was called the Cheshire Canal Ring, but the word "canal" had been dropped by November. The route comprises the Macclesfield Canal, the Hall Green Branch, parts of the Trent and Mersey Canal, the Bridgwater Canal and the Rochdale Canal, all of the Ashton Canal and part of the Peak Forest Canal. There are 92 locks on the ring, which is around 95 miles (153 km) long, and it can reasonably be completed in a week.

== History ==
There were a number of early proposals to link Macclesfield to the canal network. The first was in 1765, when a link to Congleton to the south, and Northwich to the west was proposed. A writer in the Derby Mercury newspaper in 1793 suggested a link from the Caldon Branch of the Trent and Mersey Canal to Macclesfield wia Leek. Two years later, a canal from Poynton Collieries via Macclesfield to the Trent and Mersey at Lawton, with a branch via Leek to the Caldon Branch was proposed.

A rather more serious proposal was made in 1796, when gentlemen from Congleton, Leek, Macclesfield, Manchester, Stockport and the West Riding employed the engineer Benjamin Outram to survey possible routes. Outram was working on the Peak Forest Canal at the time. At a meeting in Macclesfield, held on 11 March 1796, his proposals for a canal from the Peak Forest via Rudyard to Endon on the Caldon Branch, with a separate branch or railway from Poynton and Norbury to Stockport were welcomed. However, there were dissenters, with some arguing that there was no guarantee that the Peak Forest Canal would succeed, and the Trent and Mersey Canal already had plans to build a branch from their Caldon Branch to Leek. The cost was estimated to be £90,000, and there was not enough financial support, now that the initial rush for building canals, known as Canal Mania, had ended.

In 1799, the Peak Forest Canal included clauses for a branch to the collieries at Poynton and Norbury in an act of Parliament they were trying to obtain, but those clauses were deleted during the parliamentary process. In 1805 and 1806, they attempted to find the original papers from Outram's surveys, and hoped that the Trent and Mersey might support their proposal for a canal from Marple to Lawton, via Macclesfield. There was another proposal in 1810, and various half-hearted attempts to revive the idea between 1814 and 1818, but none came to fruition. In 1824, the Cromford and High Peak Railway, a bold scheme to link the Cromford Canal and the Peak Forest Canal, was being planned, but a suggestion to build a branch of the railway to serve Macclesfield was deferred, as there was nobody from Macclesfield at the meeting. A proposal for a canal from Church Lawton to the Bridgewater Canal near Manchester, passing through Congleton, Macclesfield, and Stockport, was also made, but it was thought that there would be difficulties dealing with the Trent and Mersey Canal at one end and the Trustees of the Duke of Bridgwater at the other.

Charles Roe, who was engaged in the manufacture of silk in Macclesfield turned his attention to mineralogy and discovered a copper mine in Anglesey and it is recorded that he first engaged with it during an excursion to that area, located south of the town of Amlwch in north east Anglesey. Parys Mountain has been confirmed as a site of prehistoric mining, has some indications of Roman activity and became probably the world's largest copper mine in the 1780s. Until 1800 most mining was by open cast but from 1810 Cornishmen opened up significant underground workings. By 1900 all significant mining activity had ceased.

In conjunction with his partners he employed miners to extract the ore which was conveyed to Liverpool in coasters. Part of it was refined there and the remainder sent to Macclesfield for smelting. Soon after the commencement of this venture Mr. Roe conceived the idea of opening a communication between Liverpool and Macclesfield by a canal. This proposal was agreed to by Sir George Warren (of Poynton Lodge in Cheshire) as the route of the canal was proposed to pass through his land.

A bill was brought before Parliament and passed there but it was thrown out in the House of Lords by the influence of the Duke of Bridgewater, whose canal had been opened a short time earlier. This was a great obstacle to the success of Charles Roe and his company and shortly afterwards he discontinued his copper business. Subsequently his successors again used coasters to move the ore, this time southwards to Swansea. Here it became an important material in the use of covering the hulls of ships.

=== Proposals ===
Finally, five gentlemen from Macclesfield placed an advertisement in the Courier newspaper on 18 September 1824, which resulted in the Mayor calling a public meeting on 22 September. At the meeting, held at the Macclesfield Arms, the canal was proposed and a committee formed, consisting of the mayor and the five gentlemen. They would attempt to gain the cooperation of any owners of land through which the canal would pass, and would invite the towns of Congleton and Stockport to join them in the venture. Unlike earlier canals, the spectre of the arrival of the railways was already in sight, and at least one present at the first meeting suggested that a railway might be built. After some debate, it was decided to open subscriptions for a canal, but to consider the possibility of a railway, and some £100,000 was pledged.

The engineer Thomas Telford was employed to survey the route, and proposed a canal from Marple on the Peak Forest Canal, which would be level to beyond Macclesfield, and would then descend by a series of locks to the level of the Trent and Mersey Canal summit. It would pass close to Congleton, and would join the Trent and Mersey near Harecastle Tunnel. He stated that an adequate water supply could easily be obtained, and discounted a branch to Stockport, which would have involved a descent of 270 feet (82 m), as the town was already served by the Ashton Canal and the Peak Forest Canal. He considered five possible sites for the location of reservoirs to supply the canal.

By the time the canal gained its act of Parliament, the Macclesfield Canal Act 1826 (7 Geo. 4. c. xxx) on 11 April 1826, the estimated cost of construction, to be funded by shareholders, was put at £295,000. The authorised share capital was £300,000, and the company had powers to borrow a further £100,000.

=== Construction ===
Having conducted the survey and steered the bill through Parliament, Telford does not appear to have been involved in the construction of the canal. Tenders received for the work varied wildly in price, and he chose those that he thought best, as well as contributing £1,000, but after that, the civil engineering was managed by William Crosley, a job which he carried out to a high standard. He had previously been working on the northern end of the Lancaster Canal, but resigned from that post to work on the Macclesfield Canal. Construction of the canal began at Bollington on 4 December 1826, with a ceremonial cutting of the first sod. The northern section from Bosley Locks to Marple was awarded as five separate contracts, and work progressed steadily. The Trent and Mersey Canal had managed to get a clause inserted into the Macclesfield Canal Act 1826 that required the Trent and Mersey Canal Company to build the final mile (1.6 km) of the canal where it joined theirs, and to charge tolls to those using it. By the time the committee met in 1828, much of the northern end of the canal was nearing completion, and contracts for the three sections from Bosley to the Trent and Mersey had been awarded. No work had started on the locks, as the contractor was busy opening a quarry on the nearby hill called Bosley Cloud, and building a railway to carry the quarried stone to the lock sites.

Crosley reduced the number of reservoirs from five to two, and these were built at Bosley and Sutton. According to the Courier, the overall length of the canal had been reduced by some 2 miles (3.2 km) as a result of "the skillful management of Mr Crosley". There were problems with the Trent and Mersey length, with water seeping up and dislodging the puddle clay which made the canal watertight. This was eventually overcome by covering a short section with stone, to hold the clay in position. The committee made another inspection in June 1829, when good progress was reported on most fronts, although there were issues with the embankments at Bollington and Dane-in-Shaw, and with the aqueduct which carried the canal over the River Dane at Bosley. In the autumn of 1829, Telford also inspected the works. He highlighted a few minor problems, but was generally impressed by the quality of the workmanship. The annual meeting for 1830 was delayed, as King George IV had died, and his funeral was held on the day the meeting was scheduled. The aqueduct over the River Dane was completed on 23 October 1830, and contained 10,212 cubic feet (289 m^{3}) of stone, with the main semi-circular arch spanning 42 feet (13 m).

The committee were hoping that the canal would be completed by August 1831, but the opening was delayed, as the embankment at Dane-in-Shaw was still settling. They authorised the borrowing of £50,000 at a special meeting of shareholders held on 29 August 1831, to expedite the works. The formal opening took place on 9 November 1831, with ceremonial processions of boats from Congleton and Marple proceeding towards Macclesfield, meticulously timed so that boats would arrive at Macclesfield from both directions at the same time. Upon arrival, a salute was fired, and the Band of the Macclesfield Cavalry played God Save the King, before the proprietors and dignitaries retired to the Town Hall for dinner. A separate dinner was held at the Bulls Head Hotel for thirty of the contractors, while 500 workmen and 200 boatmen and drivers were each given half-a-crown (12.5p) to spend.

The final cost of the canal was around £320,000, only £25,000 more than the original estimate. The summit level, above Bosley Locks, was constructed at an elevation of 518 feet (158 m), on a level with the Peak Forest Canal. At Bosley, twelve locks dropped the level to almost that of the Trent and Mersey, but there is a stop lock at the junction with their Hall Green Branch, with a fall of just 1 foot (0.30 m), which ensured that the Trent and Mersey did not lose any water to the new canal. When originally built, the chamber was very long, and both companies installed a set of lock gates, enabling them both to collect tolls. Each company built a cottage overlooking the locks, the Macclesfield Canal constructing theirs of stone, while the Trent and Mersey used brick. A long overflow above the locks channels surplus water to the Trent and Mersey Canal, as stipulated by the amendment to the 1827 act. Only one set of gates is still in place, and this is the set that was originally the Macclesfield Canal lock.

=== Early years ===
At the annual general meeting, held in July 1833, there was good news to report. Crosley had left the employment of the canal company on 24 June, but had produced a detailed report on the condition of the works before he left, in which he stated that there was no observable settlement in the embankments, the stonework of the locks, bridges and aqueducts was still good and showing no signs of failure, and the reservoir at Bosley had been filled to the top of several occasions, without any sign of leakage. Edward Stanley, the chairman of the management committee, reported that trade was brisk, and that 98,201.5 tons of cargo had been carried in the first full year of operation (March 1832-March 1833), generating an income of £6,117. Even a reduction in the rates being charged, to bring them in line with other canals, had not resulted in an appreciable fall in income. The company had built six wharfs, and was building a seventh at Bosley, four of which also had warehouses. In addition, ten houses had been built, for use by various members of staff, and offices had been constructed at Macclesfield. The company had bought the land for a second reservoir at Sutton and had already built the feeders to link it to the canal.

By 1838, the canal company was looking to expansion, and sought to build a branch from Buglawton to Biddulph, to serve the coal mines. Initially proposed as a canal, and later as a railway, the plan was eventually dropped after it met with a less than enthusiastic reception from shareholders who were seeking a more substantial dividend, rather than re-investment of profits, and from the mine owners. In the same year, the company joined forces with the Trent and Mersey, the Peak Forest and the Ashton Canal companies to successfully oppose plans to open a new canal from Middlewich to Altrincham.

=== Arrival of the railways ===
As with so many UK canals, the arrival of the railways led to the decline of the canal. By 1845, the spectre of railway competition was looming large, and the proposals for the Trent and Mersey Company to merge with a railway company were causing concern. It was discussed at the 1845 general meeting, as it seemed likely that such a move would be detrimental to the Macclesfield Canal. They tried to cut costs by reducing the number of staff and lowering their wages, all the while reducing tolls in an attempt to retain traffic. They had ceased to pay dividends to the shareholders after a final payment of £1.50 in 1840.

Despite this, they encouraged the use of stream boats, and in 1842 began running swift packet boats carrying leisure traffic from Dukinfield Central railway station, close to Dukinfield Junction on the Peak Forest Canal to Disley, Lyme Park and Macclesfield at fares of 1-1 1/2d per mile. Promotional material stated that "this line of conveyance is peculiarly adapted for pleasure parties, who may enjoy a delightful and healthy excursion on the Peak Forest Canal, and spend a day in the rural woods and pleasure grounds in the neighbourhood. The scenery is beautiful in the extreme, and cannot be equalled in any part of the country." However, the service does not appear to have lasted beyond 1846.

With proposals for the North Staffordshire Railway underway by 1845, the canal company threatened to build their own railway between the branch of the Manchester and Birmingham Railway at Macclesfield and Harecastle Tunnel, where it would meet the North Staffordshire Railway. The railway promoters immediately tried to gain the support of the Macclesfield Canal, by offering them shares, and requesting their assistance in promoting their act of Parliament. The canal company suggested that the railway could lease the canal at £2 per share per year. The railway company responded with an alternative plan, which would see them buying the canal within five years for £2.50 per share, and paying off some of the canal's debts. This was rejected by the shareholders, who authorised the committee to negotiate with other railways, or to seek the required powers to build their own railway.

By June 1846 the company had negotiated an alternative arrangement with the Sheffield, Ashton-under-Lyne and Manchester Railway. Under the terms of this agreement, the railway company took out a perpetual lease of the canal at an annual rent of £6,605, which amounted to £2.50 per share, and was broadly equivalent to the dividend paid by the canal company prior to 1840. They also made a payment of £60,000, to cover all outstanding debts of the canal company. A bill to authorise the takeover of both the Macclesfield Canal and the Peak Forest Canal was sought and an act of Parliament was obtained in late 1846. The final meeting of the canal company took place on 15 July 1847, although it remained as a legal entity until 1883, to manage the rents. The railway company began selling water from the canal as soon as it took over.

=== Ownership ===
At the time it took out its lease, the Sheffield, Ashton-under-Lyne and Manchester Railway was itself at an advanced stage in negotiating a merger with other railway companies, and on 1 January 1847, ownership of the canal passed to the Manchester, Sheffield and Lincolnshire Railway. With an expectation that they would complete the construction of their London extension in 1899, the company changed its name to the Great Central Railway in 1897. When most of the railways of Britain were amalgamated in 1922, under the provisions of the Railways Act 1921, known as "the grouping", the Great Central Railway and hence the canal passed into the ownership of the London and North Eastern Railway (LNER).

In 1848, the carriage of goods earned the company £9,049. The railway company began operating as a carrier soon afterwards, on a fairly small scale, and this continued until 1894, by which time most of the trade was in cotton. Trade in the return direction dwindled, to the point where the operation was uneconomic, and ceased. In 1905, boats using the canal carried coal, raw cotton, grain, which was supplied to textile and flour mills, and stone, but by this time traffic volumes were small. On 29 February 1912, the canal burst its banks at Kerridge, flooding several nearby streets. The cause was the failure of a culvert that carried Tinkers Brook under the canal embankment, at about 1:00 am. By the time the bridges could be stopped with stop planks, most of the upper pound above Bosley locks had drained away. It took three weeks to repair the breach, and around 100 men were employed to fill the gap with 160 boat loads of clay puddle and other materials.

=== Leisure age ===
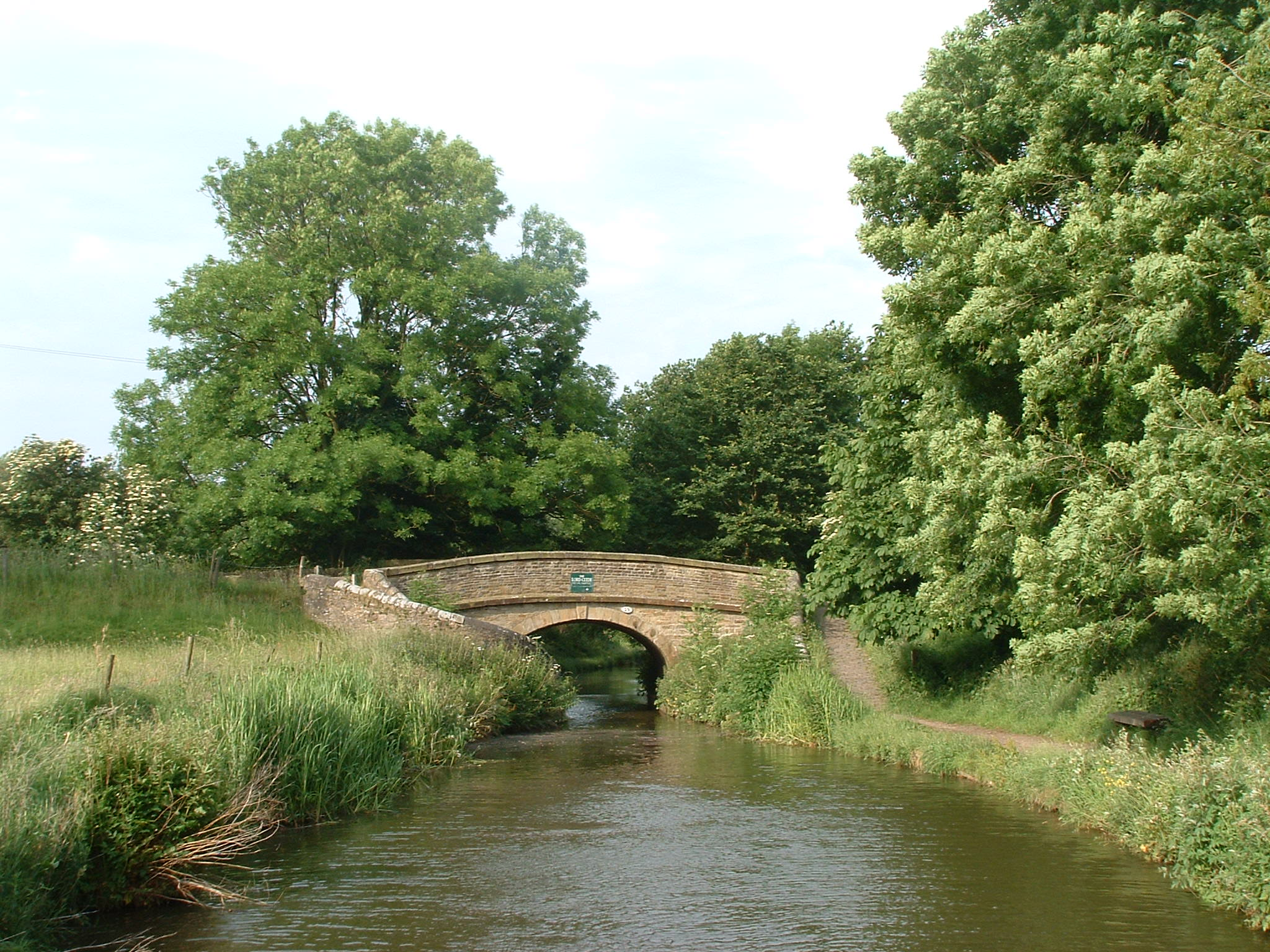
Roving bridges on the Macclesfield Canal are known locally as Snake bridges.

Commercial carrying on the canal ended in 1954, when the carriage of coal between Stoke and Marple ceased. There had been some leisure use of the canal since the end of the First World War, with the High Lane Arm acting as a base, where a number of boathouses were built. In 1937, the local authority decided that such buildings should incur rates, and a group of boaters joined together to challenge this. They were unsuccessful, although they did prevent the rates from being backdated for six years, and in 1943, a more formal organisation was formed. The chairman, Harry Downs, who had had many dealings with the North Cheshire Water Board, suggested that it should be called the North Cheshire Cruising Club, and this was agreed. They subsequently rented part of the arm from the LNER. The club is acknowledged to be the first such cruising club to be formed in Britain.

With the nationalisation of the railways in 1948, responsibility for the canal passed to the British Transport Commission. In 1955, a Board of Survey carried out an assessment of the canals, and many in the fledgling waterways movement, including the Inland Waterways Association, expected that the British Transport Commission annual bill for that year would include powers to close many of the canals rated as Class 3 by the Board of Survey. However, with growing public unease at the perceived fate of the canals, no such powers were included in the bill. The canal was visited by Sir Reginald Kerr, the head of British Transport Waterways, and other dignitaries on 27 February 1958, and again by boat on 21 May 1958, when he expressed his intent to ensure that the canals were used by private boaters. There was a risk that the northern end of the canal would be cut off by the closure of the Lower Peak Forest and the Ashton Canal, but vigorous campaigning and a growing restoration movement resulted in the passing of the Transport Act 1968, which effectively assured their future. As part of the Inland Waterways Amenity Advisory Council's Recreational Framework for Britain's Canals initiative, published as a policy document in 1975, Macclesfield Borough Council designated the whole canal as a Conservation Area in June of that year.

== Features ==
The following are all Grade II listed structures:

- Five aqueducts (Biddulph Valley, Canal Road, Dane, Pool Lock, Red Bull)
- All twelve locks
- Bridge numbers 1, 2, 4–12, 33, 35, 36, 38–41, 43, 44, 50, 52–64, 66, 67, 69, 70, 72, 74, 76, 77
- Pool Lock footbridge
- Warehouse adjacent to bridge number 1
- Drydock at 53.2878°N 2.1045°W
- Sluices Weir and Culvert carrying Shores Clough under the canal
- Disused tunnel under canal near Canal Road, Congleton at 53.1567°N 2.2009°W
- Fourteen milestones
- Five distance markers
- Two sets of stone fence posts

The Hall Green Branch, whilst originally built by the Trent & Mersey Canal Company, is often considered as part of the Macclesfield Canal in modern maps and guidebooks. Hall Green Stop Lock survives, with its rise and fall of about a foot (0.3m); this was to prevent the Trent & Mersey losing water to the Macclesfield in the event of a breach in the latter. There are no tunnels on the Macclesfield Canal, but there are several impressive embankments, including those at Bollington and High Lane on the upper section, and one over the River Dane on the lower section, close to Bosley bottom lock. The Macclesfield Canal is renowned for its elegant roving bridges, locally known as Snake Bridges.

== Proposed connection ==
In 1992, the magazine Waterways World carried an article about a trip made by John Liley from the Caldon Canal feeder, across Rudyard Lake, and ending at the Macclesfield Canal feeder at the top of Bosley Locks. He had made the journey as a boy, and had used a portable dinghy for some of the route. This led to a number of people suggesting that the route could be made fully navigable, to effectively create a new cruising ring. The idea was examined again in 2004, in an article about the lake, in which it was stated that the feeder, which is about 2.5 miles (4 km) long, and the streams which feed into the north end of the lake, could provide a fairly level route for such a canal, which would join the Macclesfield at the bottom of Bosley flight. The main obstacle to overcome would be the difference in height between the start of the feeder and the level of the lake, as the earth dam is 63 feet (19 m) tall. A short flight of locks or perhaps a boat lift was suggested.

== Bibliography ==
- Cousins, Graham (2002a). "Macclesfield Canal proposals, 1765–1824". The Railway & Canal Historical Society.
- Cousins, Graham (2002b). "Macclesfield Canal water supply". The Railway & Canal Historical Society.
- Cousins, Graham (2002c). "Macclesfield Canal construction". The Railway & Canal Historical Society.

These three articles were originally published in the Journal of the Railway and Canal Historical Society, Vol. 33 Pt. 2 No. 173, July 1999, pp.63-76

- Cousins, Graham (2002d). "The Early Working Years". The Railway & Canal Historical Society.
- Cousins, Graham (2002e). "Macclesfield Canal - Benefits". The Railway & Canal Historical Society.
- Cousins, Graham (2002f). "Branch to Biddulph?". The Railway & Canal Historical Society.
- Cousins, Graham (2002g). "Macclesfield Canal - Committee". The Railway & Canal Historical Society.
- Cousins, Graham (2002h). "Macclesfield Canal 1845 - 1846". The Railway & Canal Historical Society.

These five articles were originally published in the Journal of the Railway and Canal Historical Society, Vol. 33 Pt. 8 No 179, July 2001, pp. 553-573

- Cumberlidge, Jane (2009). Inland Waterways of Great Britain (8th Ed.). Imray Laurie Norie and Wilson. ISBN 978-1-84623-010-3.
- Dow, George (2004). Great Central. Volume One: The Progenitors, 1813–1863. Ian Allan. ISBN 978-0-7110-1468-8.
- Gilman, H J (1992). The Macclesfield Canal. M G Publications. ISBN 978-0-9518608-0-9.
- Hadfield, Charles (1985). The Canals of the West Midlands. David & Charles. ISBN 978-0-7153-8644-6.
- Nicholson (2006). Nicholson Waterways Guide (Vol 5): North West and the Pennines. HarperCollins. ISBN 978-0-00-721113-5.
- Paget-Tomlinson, Edward (2006). The Illustrated History of Canal and River Navigations. Landmark Publishing. ISBN 978-1-84306-207-3.
- Shead, Jim (March 2004). "The Cheshire Ring". Waterways World. ISSN 0309-1422. Archived from the original on 3 March 2016.
- Sims, Jon (April 2004). "An Exceedingly Good Lake". Waterways World. ISSN 0309-1422.
- Squires, Roger (2008). Britain's restored canals. Landmark Publishing. ISBN 978-1-84306-331-5.

== See also ==
- Narrowboat
- Braidbar Boats
