= Burslem Port Trust =

UK charity

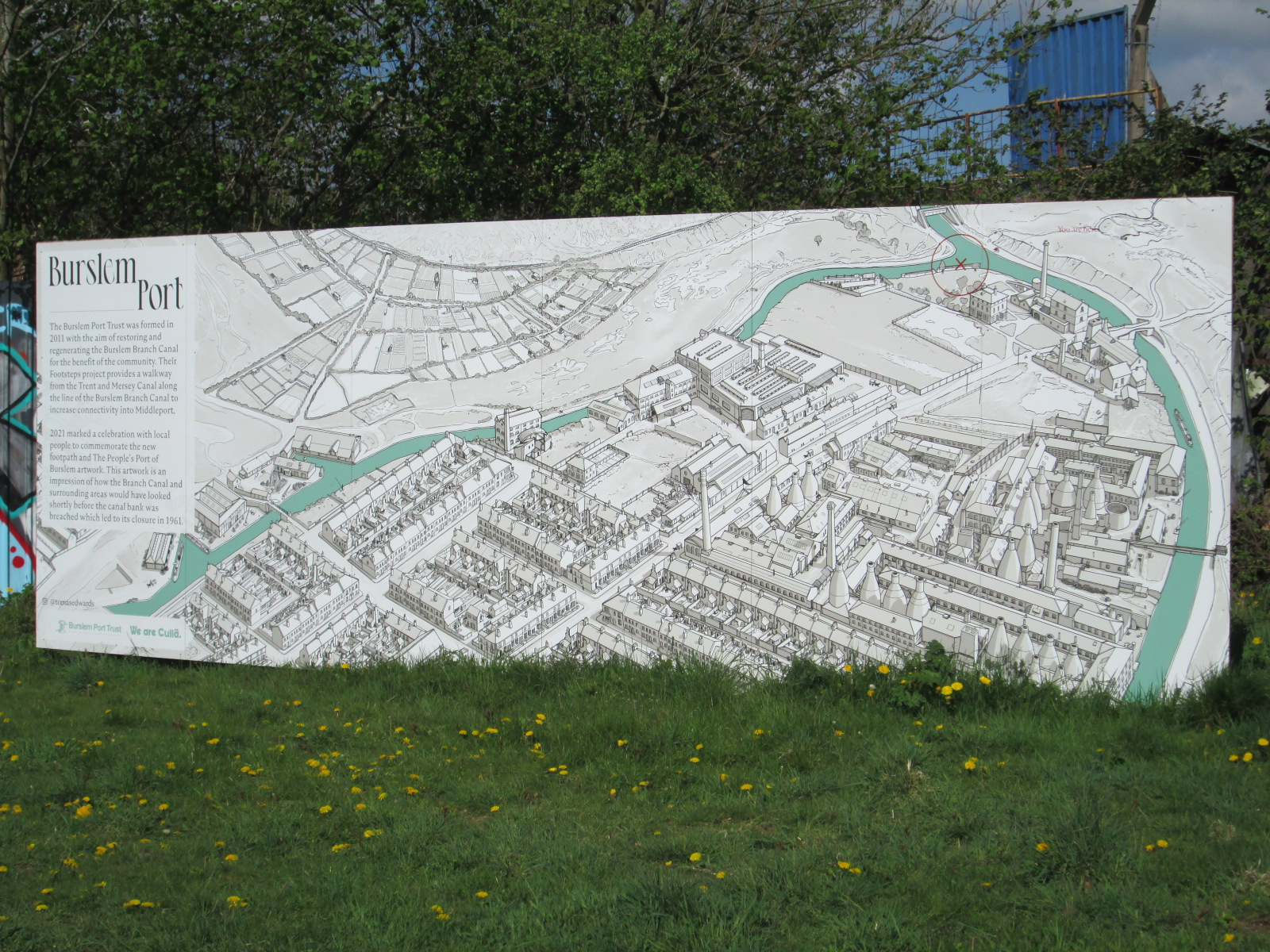
Information board by the Trent and Mersey Canal, at the former junction with the Burslem Branch Canal. The artwork shows how the Branch Canal and surrounding areas would have looked shortly before the breach in 1961.

The Burslem Port Trust is a project to reopen the Burslem Branch Canal, an arm of the Trent and Mersey Canal in Burslem, Stoke-on-Trent in Staffordshire, England.

== History ==
The Burslem Branch Canal, 3/8 mile (0.60 km) long, was authorised by the Trent and Mersey Canal Act 1797 (37 Geo. 3. c. 81), and completed in 1805. It was linked by a tramway uphill to the centre of Burslem. The canal breached in 1961, a result of mining subsidence and lack of maintenance; much of the summit pound of the Trent and Mersey Canal was drained, from Etruria to Kidsgrove. It was then closed off at the junction of the Trent and Mersey main line.

== The trust ==
The Burslem Port Trust was formed in 2011. It is jointly owned by the Inland Waterways Association and the Trent and Mersey Canal Society. In 2014 the Trust published a comprehensive proposal and plan, and volunteer work parties were started.

In 2018 the trust received a grant of £45,000 from Stoke-on-Trent City Council's Community Investment Fund, to which was added £5000 from the Canal & River Trust. In the same year a strategic action plan was produced, detailing the numbers of jobs, canalside homes, visitors and boat movements that restoration of the canal would produce, and the amount of inward investment it could attract. Roger Savage, chairman of the Burslem Port Trust, said: "This new report confirms there is sound economic benefit for investing in the restoration of the Burslem Branch Canal".

In 2021, work to create a footpath along the canal was undertaken, and mostly completed, by volunteers and a local contractor. This will provide a walkway from the Trent and Mersey Canal along the line of the Burslem Branch Canal; there will be information boards describing the canal's history and intentions for its restoration.
