= Trent and Mersey Canal =

Canal in England

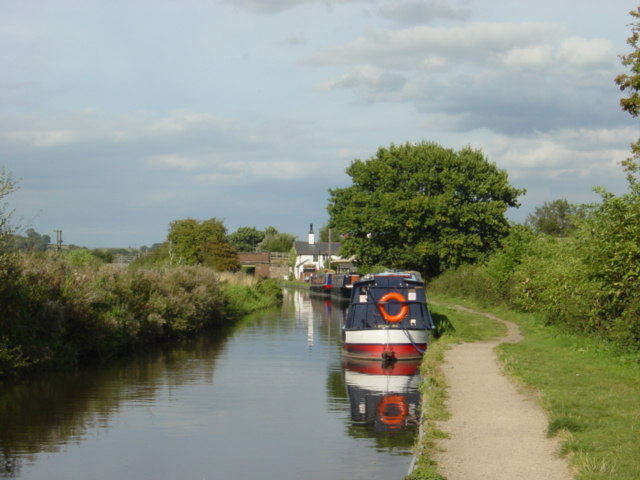
- The Trent and Mersey Canal near Branston Water Park
- Interactive map of Trent and Mersey Canal

Specifications
- Locks: 76
- Status: Open
- Navigation authority: Canal and River Trust

History
- Principal engineer: James Brindley
- Other engineer: Hugh Henshall
- Date of act: 1766
- Date of first use: 1777

Geography
- Start point: River Trent, Derwent Mouth
- End point: River Mersey (via Bridgewater Canal)
- Connects to: Coventry Canal; Staffs & Worcs Canal; Caldon Canal; Macclesfield Canal; Shropshire Union Canal; Bridgewater Canal

The Trent and Mersey Canal is a 93 1/2-mile (150 km) canal in Derbyshire, Staffordshire and Cheshire in north-central England. It is a "narrow canal" for the vast majority of its length, but at the extremities to the east of Burton upon Trent and north of Middlewich, it is a wide canal.

The narrow locks and bridges are big enough for a single narrowboat 7 feet (2.1 m) wide by 72 feet (22 m) long, while the wide locks can accommodate boats 14 feet (4.3 m) wide, or two narrowboats next to each other.

== History ==
The Trent and Mersey Canal (T&M) was built to link the River Trent at Derwent Mouth in Derbyshire to the River Mersey, and thereby provide an inland route between the major ports of Hull and Liverpool. The Mersey connection is made via the Bridgewater Canal, which it joins at Preston Brook in Cheshire. Although mileposts measure the distance to Preston Brook and Shardlow, Derwent Mouth is about 1 mile (1.6 km) beyond Shardlow.

Trent and Mersey Canal Act 1766
- Act of Parliament
- Parliament of Great Britain
- Long title: An Act for making a Navigable Cut, or Canal, from the River Trent, at or near Wilden Ferry in the County of Derby, to the River Mersey at or near Runcorn Gap.
- Citation: 6 Geo. 3. c. 96
- Territorial extent: Great Britain

Dates
- Royal assent: 14 May 1766
- Commencement: 17 December 1765 (Note: Start of session.)
Other legislation
Amended by	Trent and Mersey Canal Act 1770; Trent and Mersey Canal Act 1783; Severn Navigation Act 1843; Staffordshire and Worcestershire Canal Act 1933

Status: Amended

Text of statute as originally enacted

The plan of a canal connection from the Mersey to the Trent ("The Grand Trunk") came from canal engineer James Brindley. It was authorised by an act of Parliament, the Trent and Mersey Canal Act 1766 (6 Geo. 3. c. 96) and the first sod was cut by Josiah Wedgwood in July that year at Brownhills, Burslem. In 1777, the canal was completed, including more than 70 locks and five tunnels, with the company headquarters in Stone.

The first known idea to build a canal between the River Mersey and the River Trent was put forward in 1755, though no action was taken at that time. In 1760, Lord Gower, a local businessman and brother-in-law of the Duke of Bridgewater, drew up a plan for the Trent and Mersey Canal. If his plan had gone ahead, this would have been the second modern canal constructed in England, after the Sankey Canal (1757). James Brindley, the engineer behind many of the canals in England, did his first canal work on the Trent and Mersey, though his first job in charge of construction was on the Bridgewater Canal.

In 1761, Josiah Wedgwood showed an interest in the construction of a canal through Stoke-on-Trent, the location of his Wedgwood pottery, as his business depended on the safe and smooth transport of his pots. Pots transported by road were liable to be damaged and broken, and a canal near to his factory would provide fast and safe transport for his wares. Wedgwood's plan was not to connect the two rivers by canal, but to connect the potteries to the River Mersey.

There was much debate about possible routes that a canal could take. Coal merchants in Liverpool felt threatened about a canal that could bring coal in from Cheshire. The owners of the River Weaver Navigation were also not happy about the proposals, because the route would almost parallel that of the river. Yet another route was published which, much to the shock of Wedgwood, did not at all include the potteries.

Wedgwood, intent on having a waterway connection to his potteries, managed to send his proposal to Parliament, with the help of two of his friends, Thomas Bentley and Erasmus Darwin. John Gilbert's plan for the "Grand Trunk" canal met opposition at the eastern end where, in Burton on Trent, the locals objected to the canal passing parallel to the upper Trent navigation. In 1764, Wedgwood managed to convince Gilbert to include the Potteries in his route. In 1766, Gilbert's plan was authorised by an Act of Parliament. Later that year, "[o]n July 26th a massive celebration was held in the Potteries where Josiah Wedgwood cut the first sod of soil. James Brindley was employed as engineer and work got under way."

Six years before the complete opening of the Trent and Mersey Canal in 1771, Wedgwood built the factory village of Etruria on the outskirts of Stoke-on-Trent, close to the canal. By this time, much of the canal had been built towards Preston Brook. The only obstacle that still had to be tackled by the canal company was the hill at Kidsgrove, through which a tunnel was being dug. Up until 1777, pots had to be carried on the short journey from Etruria, over the top of Kidsgrove Hill, and to the other side, where the canal had been constructed to Preston Brook.

On 15 January 1847 the Trent and Mersey Canal was acquired by the North Staffordshire Railway Company (NSR) under the North Staffordshire Railway (Pottery Line) Act 1846 (9 & 10 Vict. c. lxxxv). This was done to stifle the opposition of the canal company to the creation of the railway company. In particular, the NSR had plans for a railway from Stoke-on-Trent to Liverpool, however, this line was abandoned because of opposition from other rail interests.

North Staffordshire Railway Act 1891
- Act of Parliament
- Parliament of the United Kingdom
- Long title: An Act to authorise the North Staffordshire Railway Company to construct new locks and approaches thereto on the Trent and Mersey Navigation to divert certain roads to acquire additional lands and to confer other powers on such Company.
- Citation: 54 & 55 Vict. c. xxxiv
- Territorial extent: United Kingdom

Dates
- Royal assent: 11 June 1891
- Commencement: 11 June 1891 (Note: The Acts of Parliament (Commencement) Act 1793.)

Status: Current legislation

Text of statute as originally enacted

In 1891 the North Staffordshire Railway Company obtained statutory powers in the North Staffordshire Railway Act 1891 (54 & 55 Vict. c. xxxiv) to raise £400,000 (equivalent to £43,940,000 in 2025) to widen and improve the canal. By 1893 the section between the Anderton Boat Lift and Middlewich had been widened and deepened to allow an increase in the maximum tonnage of boats using this section to be increased from 30 tons to 60 tons. The basin at Middlewich was widened from 16 feet (4.9 m) to 50 feet (15 m) with the erection of a concrete wall and an extension to the wharfage. The canal was dredged by a Priestman-type steam dredger which removed between 80,000 and 100,000 long tons (81,000 and 102,000 t; 90,000 and 112,000 short tons).

The Grand Trunk was a part of a larger scheme of James Brindley's to link the four main rivers of England (Trent, Mersey, Severn and Thames) in a project known as the "Grand Cross". The Trent and Mersey Canal provided the northwestern arm of the cross (to the Mersey), and the northeastern arm (to the Trent). It also provided the central hub of the cross, between Great Haywood, and Fradley Junctions. The southwestern arm, to the Severn, was built as the Staffordshire and Worcestershire Canal, whilst the southeastern arm (to the Thames) traversed the Coventry and Oxford canals.

In July 1923, the Trent and Mersey Canal became part of the new London, Midland and Scottish Railway.

The Trent and Mersey was nationalised along with its owning railway, and became part of the British Transport Commission in 1949, and then British Waterways from 1962.

== Map and gallery ==
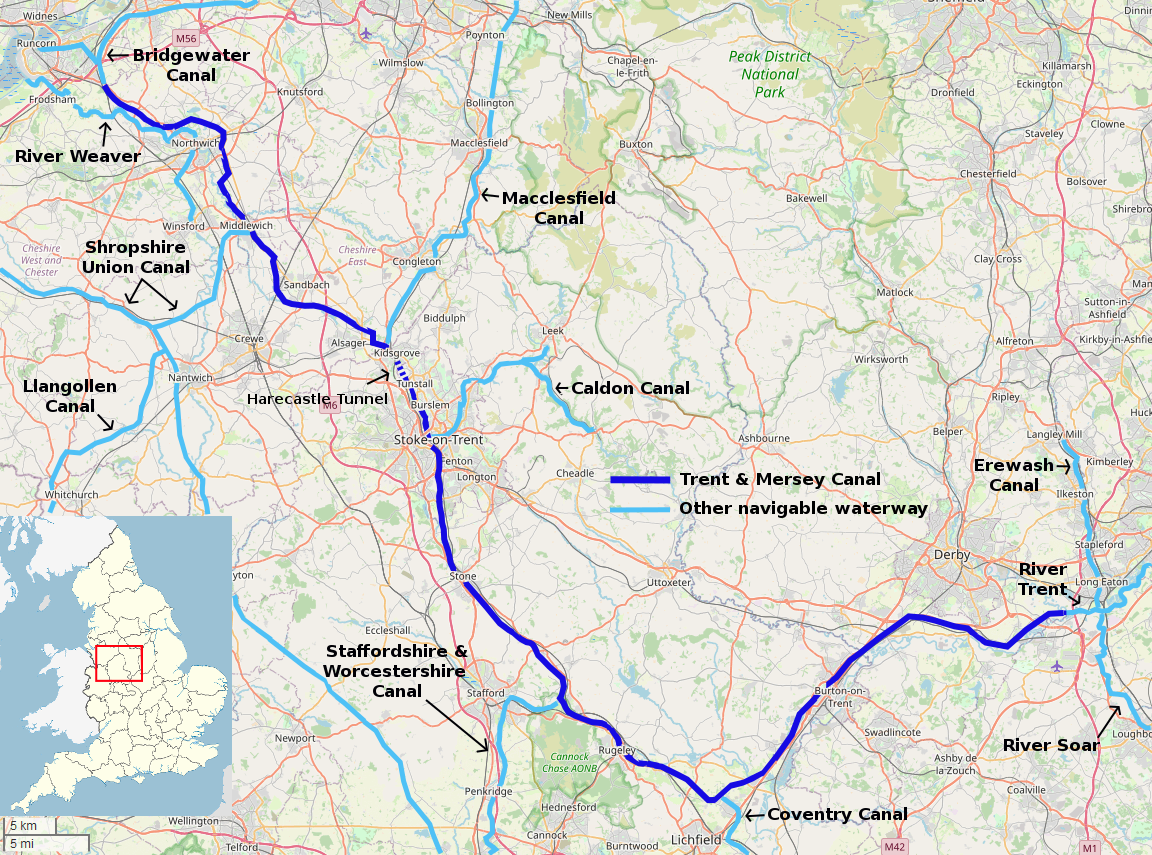
Map the Trent and Mersey Canal (marked in dark blue)

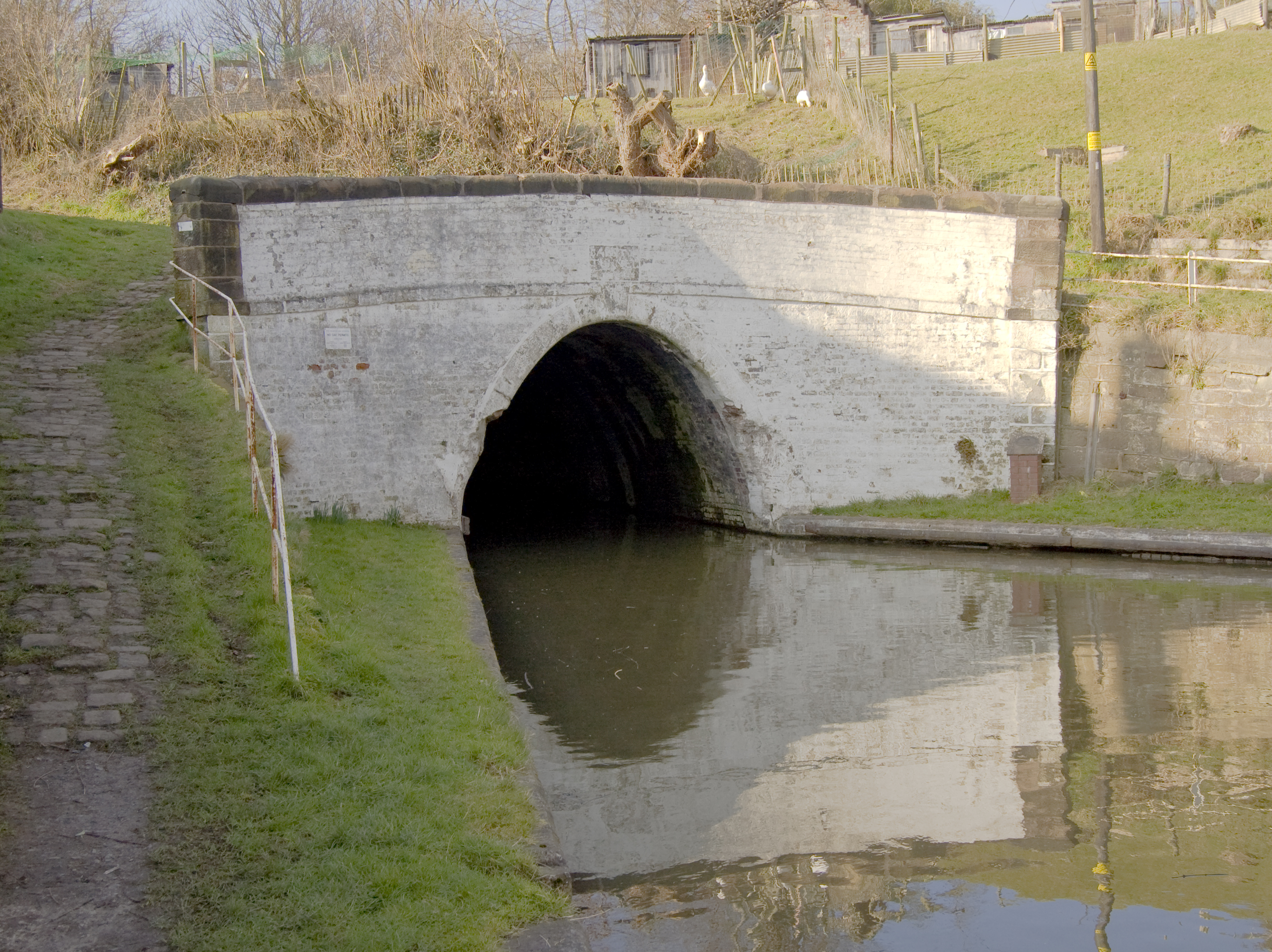
Barnton Tunnel east entrance

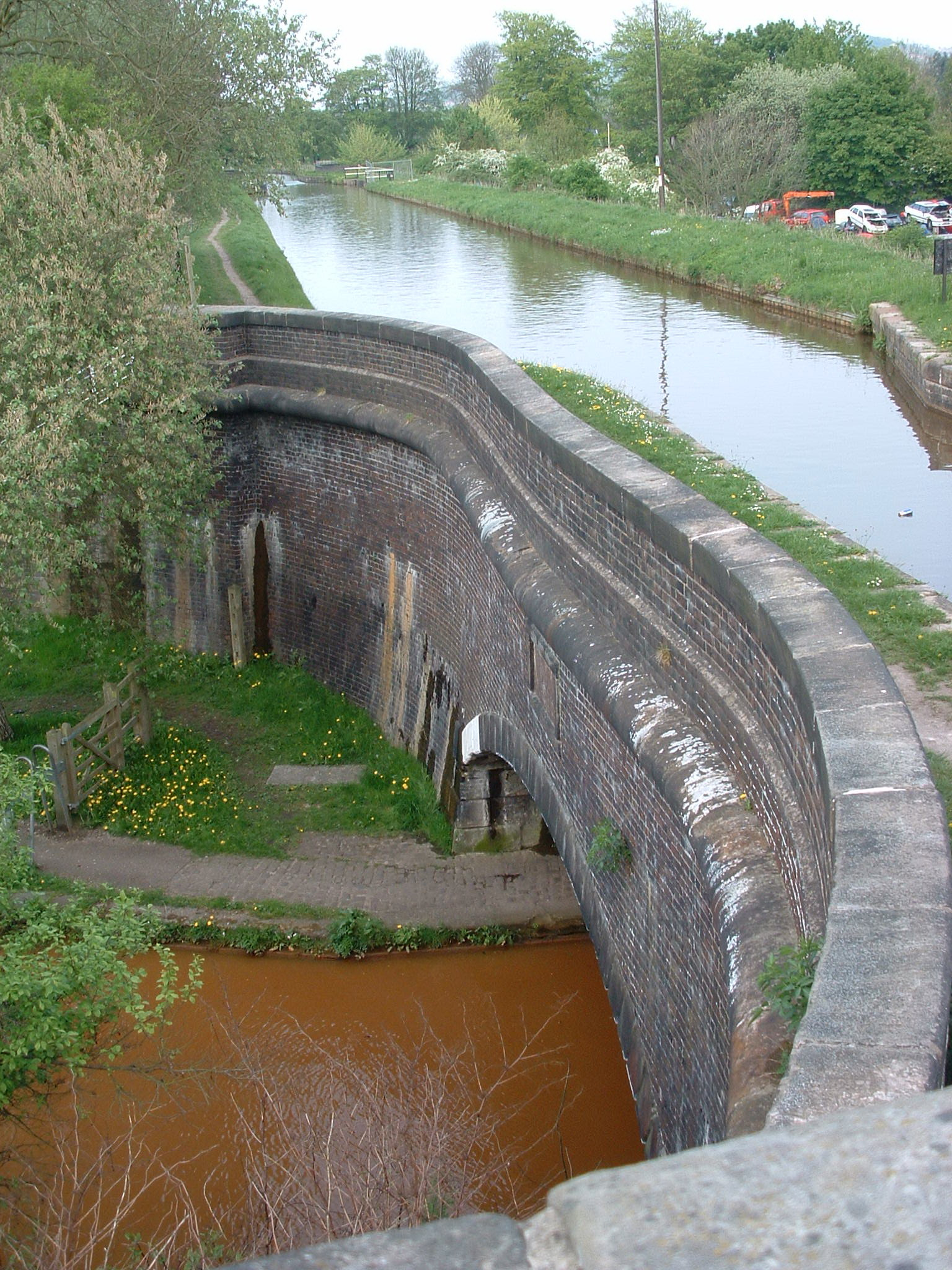
Hall Green Branch crosses the T&M at Poole Aqueduct

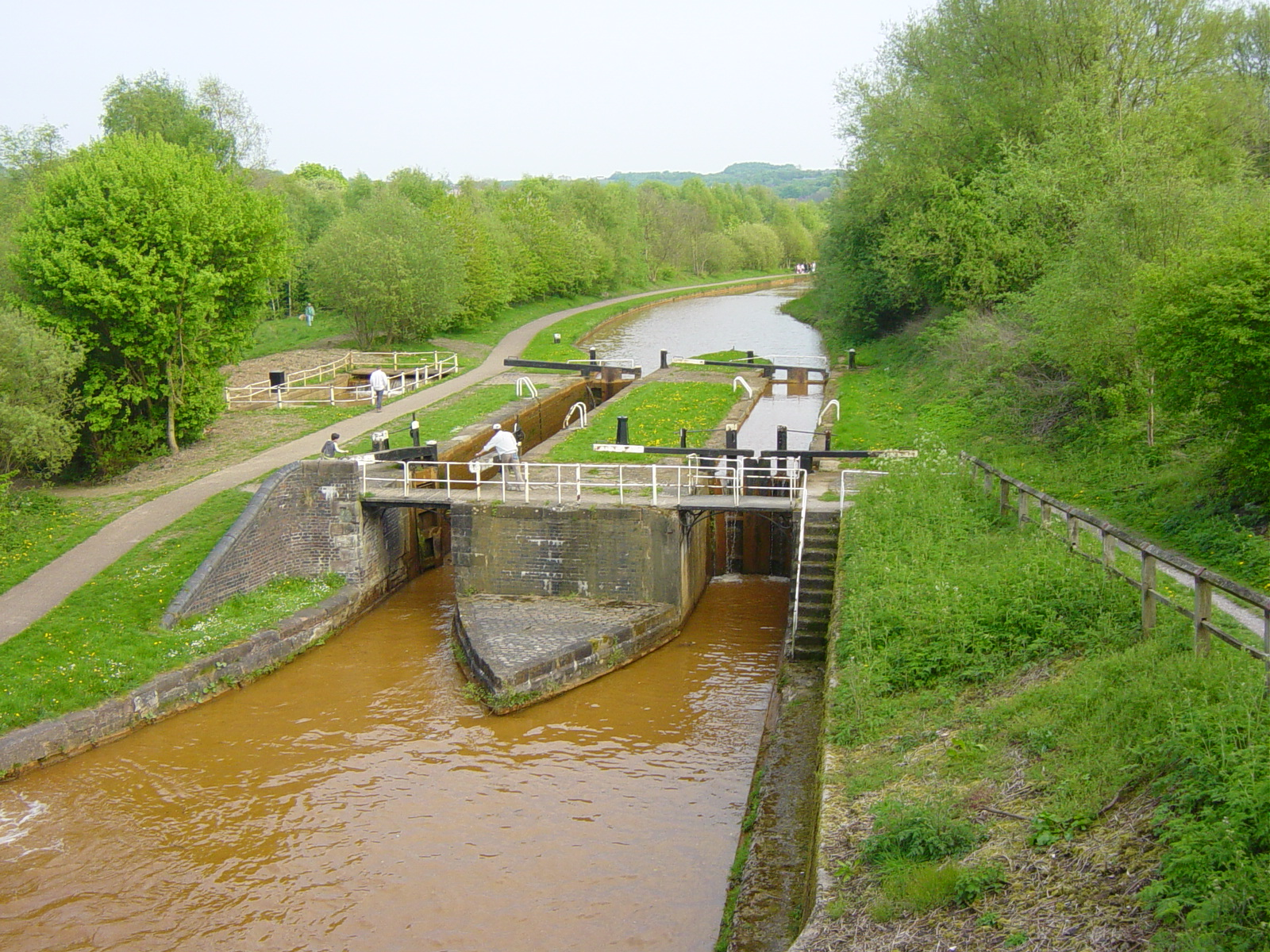
A typical set of double locks on the T&M

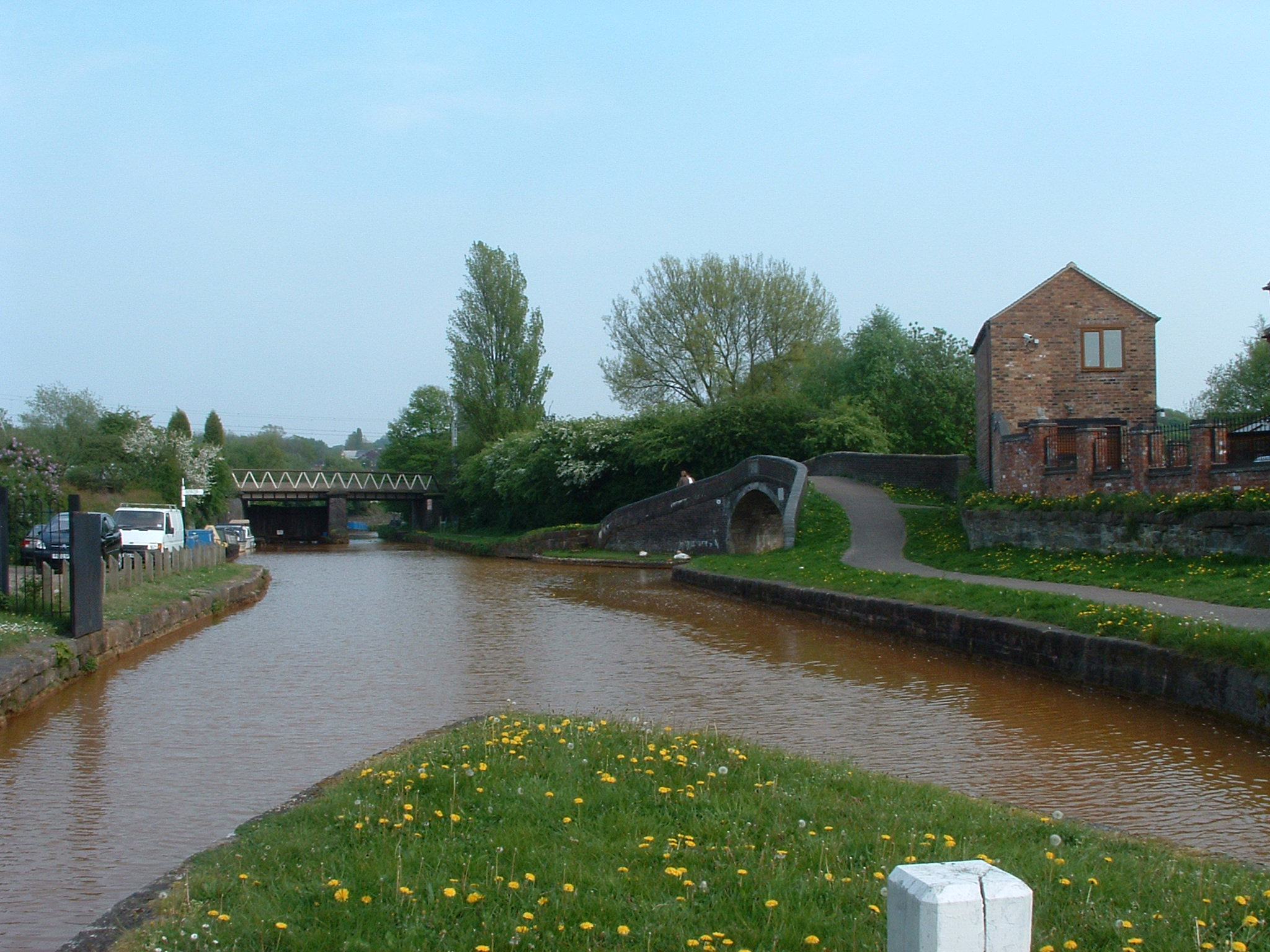
Hardings Wood Junction with the Hall Green Branch

== Features ==
=== Anderton Lift ===
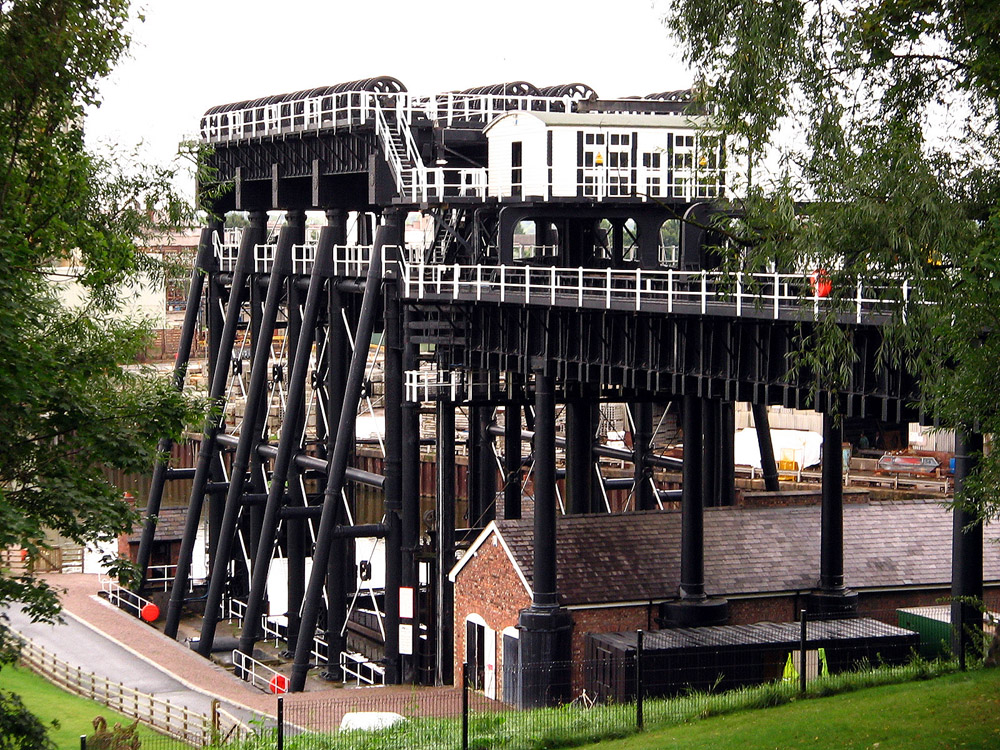
The Anderton Boat Lift

On the Cheshire stretch of the canal, between Middlewich and the northern end of the canal in Preston Brook Tunnel, is the Victorian Anderton Boat Lift, which lowers boats fifty feet from the T&M to the River Weaver. It was restored to full operation in 2002 after twenty years of disuse, and was then the only operational boat-lift in the United Kingdom until the construction of the Falkirk Wheel in Scotland.

=== Harecastle Tunnel ===
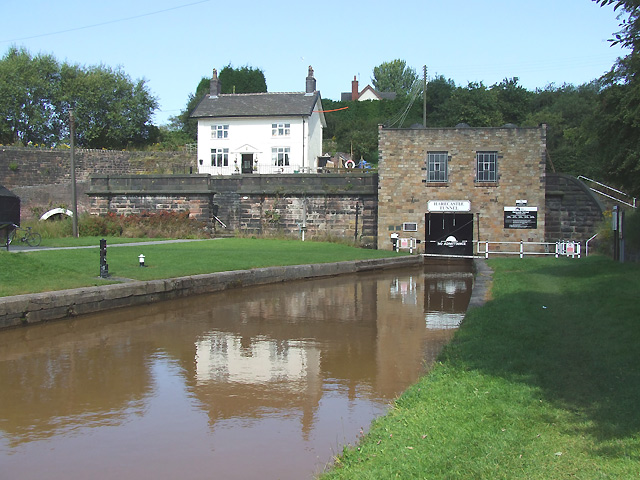
The south portal of the Harecastle Tunnel

Another major feature is the Harecastle Tunnel, near Kidsgrove in the city of Stoke-on-Trent, north Staffordshire. There are actually two tunnels; the first was built by Brindley and was 2,880 yards (2,630 m) long, and boats were moved through by men lying on their backs and pushing against the roof with their feet. This was a physically demanding and slow process and created major delays, so civil engineer Thomas Telford was commissioned to provide a second, wider, parallel tunnel with a towpath. This 2,926-yard-long (2,676 m) tunnel was opened in 1827.

In the 1900s, the Brindley tunnel was closed because of severe subsidence, but the Telford Tunnel – although also prone to the same problems – remains in use, and is the fourth-longest navigable canal tunnel in the United Kingdom.

=== Flyover Junction ===
Poole Lock aqueduct

Just north of Harecastle Tunnel, the T&M features a 'flyover' junction. The Hall Green Branch leaves the T&M mainline (which runs east–west here) on the south side, but then crosses over the main line and travels a short distance north to join the Macclesfield Canal at Hall Green Stop lock (some guides do not refer to the Hall Green branch, simply treating it as part of the Macclesfield Canal).

The actual junction where the branch leaves the main line is a normal right-angle junction called Hardings Wood Junction. The branch leaves the main line on the south side, then immediately turns 90 degrees clockwise. It runs westwards alongside the main line, maintaining the original level while the main line drops through two locks. At the Red Bull settlement, the branch turns 90 degrees right, to head north and cross the main line on Poole Lock aqueduct. It then immediately crosses the A50 on Red Bull aqueduct, carrying boats north to join the Macclesfield Canal at Hall Green.

=== Stoke-on-Trent ===
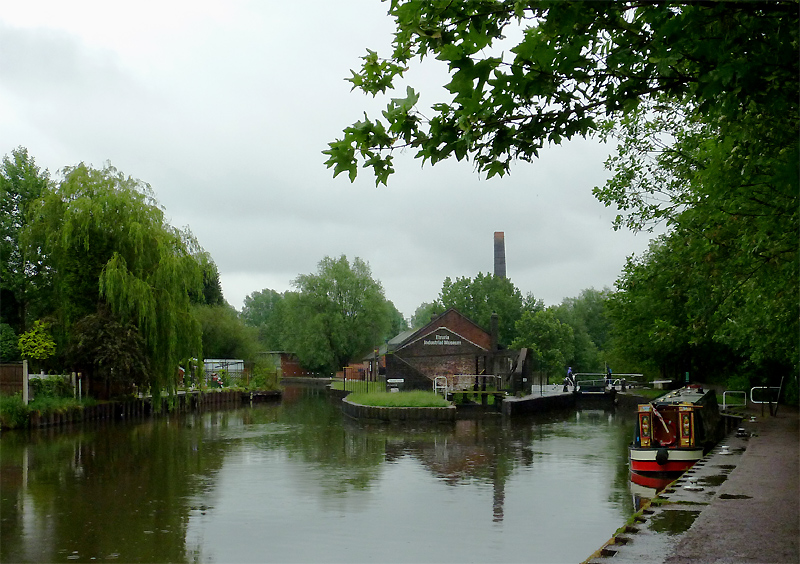
The junction of the Trent and Mersey Canal with the Caldon Canal

The canal passes through the city of Stoke-on-Trent, where it meets the Caldon Canal.

The canal formed an integral part of the 1986 Stoke-on-Trent Garden Festival and in 1988 was declared a linear Conservation Area. The towpath was upgraded in the 1990s and forms part of the National Cycle Network (Route 5).

=== Burslem Port Trust ===
A charity, the Burslem Port Trust, has been established to renovate the short Burslem arm of the Trent and Mersey Canal which will extend 3/8 mile into Burslem.

== Route ==
The route is conveniently divided into a northern and southern section by the Harecastle Tunnel.

=== Northern Trent and Mersey ===
The northern end of the canal makes an end-on junction with the Bridgewater Canal within Preston Brook Tunnel, from which one can access Runcorn (but no longer the Mersey or Ship Canal) in one direction and Manchester (with its many canal links) in the other direction.

From the junction with the Bridgewater Canal, the T&M travels south through Preston Brook Tunnel (one-way operation, alternating each half-hour) and two smaller tunnels at Saltersford (since 2008 also one-way operation, alternating each half-hour), and Barnton to the "junction" with the River Weaver at Anderton Boat Lift near Northwich.

After Anderton, the next major destination is Middlewich, where a junction with the 50-yard-long (46 m) Wardle Canal leads to the Middlewich Branch of the Shropshire Union Canal which gives access to Chester, Llangollen and (heading south on the Shropshire Union) a parallel route to Birmingham via Wolverhampton.

South of Middlewich, having passed through Wheelock, the T&M climbs out of the Cheshire Plain via the 'Heartbreak Hill' locks (more traditionally known as the 'Cheshire Locks') to the summit-level and the junction with the Hall Green Branch, leading to the Macclesfield Canal at Red Bull Kidsgrove. Most of the locks in this flight are doubled, although not all of the duplicates are still usable. Of particular note was lock 53 where, because of subsidence from brine pumping, the 'spare' lock was replaced by a steel contrivance with guillotine gates. Theoretically, this was adjustable to compensate for further subsidence although, in practice it was less than successful and was ultimately removed altogether. Little evidence of 'Thurlwood Steel Lock' remains today. The boater can use the Macclesfield Canal to head for Marple, and the junction with the Peak Forest Canal (and hence, via the Ashton, Rochdale and Bridgewater canal) to complete the 'Cheshire Ring'.

==== 2012 breach at Dutton Hollow ====
In September 2012 a serious breach occurred at Dutton Hollow near Preston Brook, which cost around £2.1 million to repair. The breach was south of bridge 213 and the canal was unusable between there and Middlewich Big Lock 75. The canal was officially reopened on 2 May 2013.

=== Southern Trent and Mersey ===
After the Harecastle Tunnel (one way, alternating roughly every two hours), the canal emerges in the outskirts of Stoke-on-Trent, and is soon in the middle of the city and then at Etruria, and the junction with the Caldon Canal.

Leaving Etruria, the canal is soon back in open country. It is now in the upper valley of the River Trent, which the canal follows until the river becomes navigable and the canal is no longer needed. The next sizeable place is the market town of Stone.

After more countryside, the canal reaches Great Haywood Junction and the towpath bridge across the junction with the Staffordshire and Worcestershire Canal, which heads south to skirt Wolverhampton and join with the River Severn at Stourport-on-Severn, thus connecting the Mersey with the Severn.

The next event is a right-angle bend, of no apparent significance from the boat, but this is where the canal (and the Trent itself) changes its basic direction from south-east to north-east (heading towards Nottingham).

Very near is Fradley Junction (with the Coventry Canal's "detached portion"). The Coventry soon leads to the Birmingham and Fazeley Canal and branches off to Birmingham or (via another stretch of the Coventry Canal) to Coventry and a junction with the Oxford Canal and thence to the Thames and the 'Southern Half' of the English canals.

The canal now heads directly to its terminus, passing through Burton upon Trent, Mercia Marina at Findern, the largest inland waterway marina in the United Kingdom, and then through wide locks (the first being at Stenson) to Shardlow and finally Derwent Mouth.

It is not far from Derwent Mouth, via the River Trent, to Trentlock, the four-way junction with the Erewash Canal (dead end at Great Northern Basin, formerly a link with the Cromford Canal), Cranfleet Cut (bypassing Thrumpton Weir to continue navigation towards Nottingham) and the River Soar Navigation (linking via Leicester to the Grand Union Canal). Beyond the Cranfleet Cut the Trent is navigable all the way to its mouth at Trent Falls on the Humber Estuary.

== See also ==
- Canals of the United Kingdom
- History of the British canal system
- Four Counties Ring, a canal cruising ring that includes part of the Trent and Mersey
