= Knypersley Reservoir =

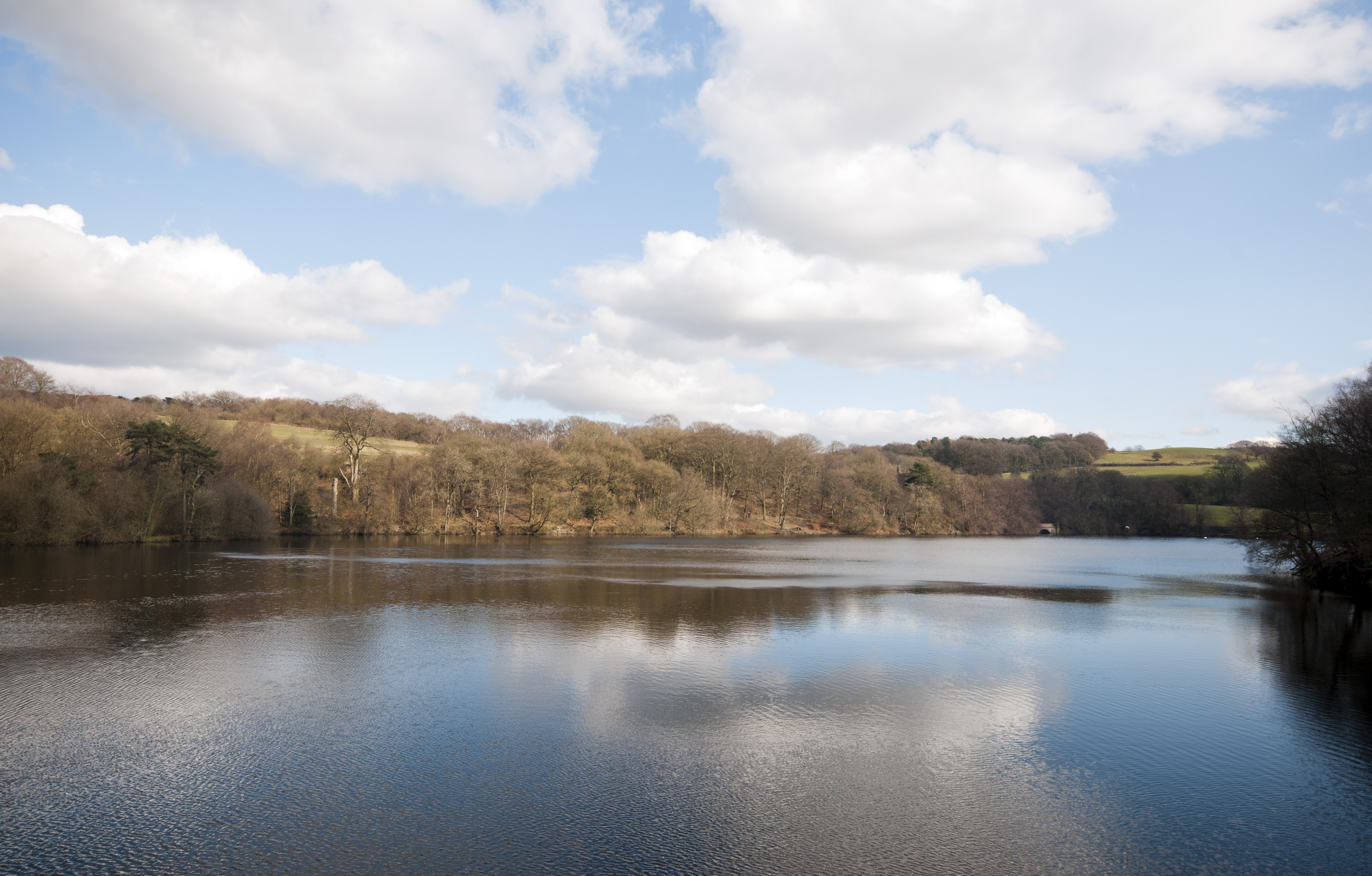

- Location within Staffordshire
- Location: near Biddulph, Staffordshire
- Coordinates: 53.094131°N 2.157384°W
- Type: canal reservoir
- Primary inflows: Head of Trent and Overflow from Serpentine Reservoir
- Primary outflows: Caldon Canal, River Trent
- Basin countries: England
- Managing agency: Canal & River Trust
- Built: 1825–1827
- First flooded: 1829
- Max. length: 630 metres (2,070 ft)
- Max. width: 220 metres (720 ft)
- Surface area: 142,000 square metres (35 acres)
- Average depth: 6.5 metres (21 ft)
- Max. depth: 12.2 metres (40 ft)
- Water volume: 930,000 m^{3} (750 acre⋅ft)
- Shore length^{1}: 1.8 kilometres (1.1 miles)
- Surface elevation: 175.81 m (576.8 ft) OD
- ^{1} Shore length is not a well-defined measure.

Knypersley Reservoir near Biddulph, Staffordshire, England, was built in 1827 to supply water to the Caldon Canal, along with two others at Stanley Pool and Rudyard Lake.

It is the only reservoir along the course of the River Trent and is surrounded by Greenway Bank Country Park.

There are two adjacent lakes at the site, the upper Serpentine Pool feeding the lower Knypersley Pool or reservoir. Designed by Thomas Telford, it was constructed by the waterways engineer James Potter. There were a number of problems both during and after construction with settlement of the dam, and a number of repairs had to be made.

In 2006, substantial improvements were made by British Waterways, and it is currently operated and managed by their successors, the Canal & River Trust, as part of the Caldon Canal group which also includes Stanley Pool and Rudyard Lake.

There are several features surrounding the reservoir which date back to the days when the site was part of the landscaped grounds of a stately home, these include a Castellated Tower, Ancient Well and Hermits Stone.

The reservoir and surrounding woodland support a wide range of birds including the mallard, great crested grebe, grey heron, blue tit, great tit, coal tit, chaffinch, grey wagtail, nuthatch and robin.

The fishing rights are owned separately by a consortium of local angling clubs, the Cheshire and North Staffs Angling Association.

The fishery is known for its stocks of large fish, notably bream, but also includes roach, perch, pike and a few carp that due to their low numbers are not easy to catch. The association manages the fishery on a catch and release basis.
