= William Hamond Bartholomew =

English engineer

William Hamond Bartholomew (30 January 1831 – 19 November 1919) was an engineer in West Yorkshire, England who was responsible for the expansion of the Aire and Calder Navigation in the 19th century and invented a number of improvements in coal-handling which led to the expansion of Goole as one of the largest exporters of coal in the country.

== Early life ==
His father, Thomas Hamond Bartholomew, was the chief engineer of the Aire and Calder Navigation, which was the transport hub of the expanding Yorkshire industry based on Leeds, Sheffield and the Yorkshire coalfields, from 1825 to 1853. William was born at Lake Lock, Stanley, West Yorkshire and was appointed as engineer of the company at the age of 22, on the death of his father at a period when the company was generating up to 150% dividends to its shareholders.

At the age of 29 he married Maria Wilson with whom he had two daughters and a son.

== Canal Engineer and Inventor ==
During his time as engineer he oversaw the rebuilding of the navigation with all the locks being lengthened to cope with increased tonnages, an unusual event in British canal history, and paving the way for future increases in the 20th century.

As early as 1852 he proposed that steam boats be introduced on the navigation as cargo-carrying tugs and in 1857 he introduced the first two such tugs. In the 1860s he proposed and supervised the expansion of the ship lock at Goole and patented a scheme for compartment boats commonly known as Tom Puddings. This improved the efficiency of carrying coal from the coalfields at Knottingley, eventually allowing 4 men to control 800 tons of cargo. By 1913 there were over 1,000 of these boats in use transporting 1.5m tons of coal annually. He constructed mechanical hoists at Goole so that the contents of the boats could be transferred to ships mechanically, one of the first such transhipment schemes in the world.

In the 1880s he carried out the Ouse improvement project, training the banks between Goole and Trent Falls with thousands of tons of stone. The Victoria entrance to Goole docks was opened to take boats up to 500 feet (150 m) long.

One of his last functions was to direct the construction of the Sheffield and South Yorkshire New Junction Canal between 1896 and 1905.
