= North Pennine Ring =

Canal ring in England

Coordinates: 53°28′28″N 2°15′24″W

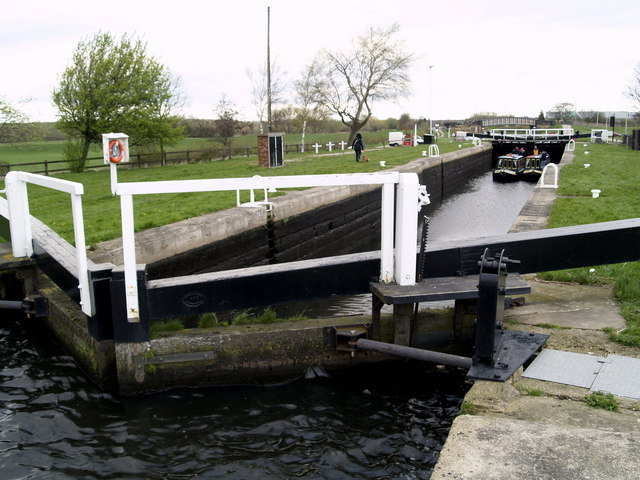
- Two narrow boats in Kings Road Lock give an idea of the size of locks on the Aire and Calder Navigation.

Specifications
- Length: 184 miles (296 km)
- Locks: 215
- Status: Canal ring
- Navigation authority: Canal and River Trust, Peel Holdings

The North Pennine Ring is a canal ring which crosses the Pennines between Manchester, Leeds and Castleford. It follows parts of five canals, and shares much of its route with the Outer Pennine Ring, which uses a different route for the southern crossing of the Pennines.

== History ==
The concept of a canal ring was created in 1965, as part of a campaign by the Inland Waterways Association to prevent the complete closure of the Rochdale Canal. Initially the canal was described as part of the "Cheshire Canal Ring", which was soon shortened to the "Cheshire Ring". It described a series of interconnecting canals which could be navigated, usually in a week or two, without having to cover any section twice, and has subsequently been applied to several other such routes. The North Pennine Ring is a recent addition, as it was only with the restoration of the Rochdale Canal in 2002 that the ring became a possibility.

The term was coined by enthusiasts as an adjunct to the South Pennine Ring, devised as a marketing tool by British Waterways.

== Route ==
The North Pennine Ring follows parts of the following canals starting from Castlefield Junction in Manchester, and proceeding clockwise around the ring.

- Bridgewater Canal
- Leeds and Liverpool Canal
- Aire and Calder Navigation
- Calder and Hebble Navigation
- Rochdale Canal

=== Bridgewater Canal ===
From Castlefield Junction, the route follows the Bridgewater Canal to Waters Meeting, where the main line turns to the left to reach Runcorn and the ring follows the Stretford and Leigh Branch to an end-on junction with the Leeds and Liverpool Leigh Branch at Leigh. This was originally considered to be the main line, as the canal was connected to a series of underground levels which ran into the coal mines at Worsley. One feature was a huge aqueduct, 38 feet (12 m) above the River Irwell, which allowed sailing ships to pass beneath it. It was demolished when the Manchester Ship Canal was built, and replaced by the famous Barton Swing Aqueduct. The canal opened in 1761, and is often thought to be the first canal in England, although it was preceded by the Sankey Canal, which opened in 1757, and the Stamford Canal, which opened in the 1670s.

The length of this section is 13.6 miles (21.9 km), and it is operated by the Manchester Ship Canal, although there is no additional charge for boats with a current British Waterways licence for the first seven days of use.

=== Leeds and Liverpool Leigh Branch ===
The Leigh Branch of the Leeds and Liverpool Canal was originally planned in 1800, but a series of disagreements with the owners of the Bridgewater Canal led to stalemate, and it was not until 1820 that the branch finally opened. A year later, there were requests to increase the length of the locks from 62 feet (19 m) to 72 feet (22 m), and this work was carried out in 1822. The route runs through a coal mining area, and has been severely affected by subsidence. It now sits on top of an embankment, made for waste from the pit tips, and the locks have been moved to Poolstock, just before the junction with the main line at Wigan. There are two locks, and the length of the section is 7.3 miles (11.7 km).

=== Leeds and Liverpool Canal ===
Construction of the Leeds and Liverpool Canal was authorised in 1770, and although the section below Wigan was open by 1777, as was another section adjoining the Aire and Calder Navigation to the west of Leeds, it did not become a through route until 1816. The locks on the section to the east of Wigan are 60 by 14.25 feet (18.29 by 4.34 m) and the North Pennine Ring climbs the top 21 locks of the 23-lock Wigan flight immediately. At the top of the flight, it joins what was once the southern part of the Lancaster Canal, which continues for 10.2 miles (16.4 km) on the level. The Walton Summit Branch of the Lancaster Canal turned off just before the seven locks at Johnson's Hillock. There are six more locks at Blackburn, a 559-yard (511 m) tunnel at Gannow and a final flight of seven locks at Barrowford to reach the summit, which is 487 feet (148 m) above sea level.

Water supply on the summit was always a problem, despite the building of several reservoirs, and the summit level, which includes the 1,640-yard (1,500 m) Foulridge Tunnel, is only 6 miles (9.7 km) long, before the descent to Leeds begins. As on the western section, the route consists of relatively long level stretches, with groups of locks at intervals. It follows the valley of the River Aire, to arrive at Leeds and the Aire and Calder Navigation. The ring has covered 92 miles (148 km) since leaving Wigan, and has passed through 85 locks.

=== Aire and Calder Navigation ===
The ring now follows an active commercial waterway, where narrowboats may meet 600-tonne oil tankers and sand barges. Most of the locks on the River Aire section from Leeds to Castleford Junction are 200 by 20 feet (61.0 by 6.1 m), while those on the River Calder section from Castleford to Wakefield are 141 by 17.75 feet (42.98 by 5.41 m). The ring does not include the navigation below Castleford, where locks were 457 feet (139 m) long, to allow them to be used by a tug and 19 Tom Pudding compartment boats.

Development of the Aire and Calder began in 1699, and continued to be improved at intervals, with the construction of bigger locks and imaginative solutions such as the compartment boats, which resulted in it flourishing until the twenty-first century. Most of the coal traffic has now ceased, to be replaced by cargos of petroleum and sand. At Castleford, great care is needed, as the Leeds Arm arrives at a crossing. Straight ahead is the channel to the enormous Castleford weir. Immediately to the left is Castleford Flood Lock, and traffic lights must be observed to prevent a collision with a commercial boat emerging from the lock. The ring turns to the right to reach Wakefield, on its way passing the Stanley Ferry Aqueducts. The original one was opened in 1839, and uses the same principles as the Sydney Harbour Bridge. Its replacement opened in 1981, but both remain in water. From Leeds to Wakefield, the distance by navigation is 17.5 miles (28.2 km) with 11 locks.

=== Calder and Hebble Navigation ===
The Calder and Hebble Navigation is another river navigation, although most river sections have been bypassed by cuts since its inception in the 1770s. The lower locks were enlarged when the waterway was leased to the Aire and Calder Navigation from 1855, enabling them to accommodate boats of 120 by 17.5 feet (36.6 by 5.3 m), but above Broad Cut Low Lock, they are still 57.5 by 14.2 feet (17.5 by 4.3 m), a size which was originally dictated by the dimensions of keel boats in use on the Humber waterways. Commercial traffic ceased to use the waterway in 1981, with the demise of coal deliveries to Thornhill power station.

To the west of Wakefield, the waterway passes under the M1 motorway, after which the scenery is dominated by the Elmley Moor television transmitter. At Dewsbury there is a short branch to Saville Town Basin. A little further to the west, the cut rejoins the river, and the next cut is to the north of the river, rather than the south. At Cooper Bridge, the Calder is joined by the River Colne. The navigation passes through Cooper Bridge Lock and Cooper Bridge Flood Gates, after which it continues straight ahead to Kirklees Cut. The Outer Pennine Ring makes a U-turn after the flood gates, to pass the Cooper Bridge weir and then follows the Huddersfield Broad Canal, the Huddersfield Narrow Canal and the Ashton Canal to reach the same destination as the North Pennine Ring. The junction is overshadowed by a tall chimney belonging to Bottomley & Sons.

The ring continues through Brighouse and past some worked-out gravel pits which are now flooded and used for water skiing. There are three locks at Salterhebble. The bottom gate of the first was replaced by a guillotine gate when the road was widened, and is electrically powered. Above the top lock is the Salterhabble Branch, which was once part of the heavily-locked branch into Halifax. The final section is narrow, and runs along the side of a wooded hill, to reach Sowerby Bridge. Nearby is another tall building, designed as a chimney for a dyeworks in 1875, but used instead as a viewing platform. It is 253 feet (77 m) tall and known as the Wainhouse Tower. From Fall Ings, the distance covered is 21.5 miles (34.6 km), and the navigation has risen through 26 locks, six flood locks and 2 sets of flood gates. Sowerby Bridge was a transshipment point for the longer boats of the Rochdale Canal.

=== Rochdale Canal ===
The Rochdale Canal forms the final part of the North Pennine Ring. It opened in 1804, and most of the locks are 72 by 14.2 feet (21.9 by 4.3 m), but locks 40, 41 and 47 are only 13.5 feet (4.1 m) wide, which restricts the size of boats that can use it. It is 32 miles (51 km) long, and most of it, except for the final nine locks at the far end, was closed for navigation in 1952. Restoration began in 1984 with the formation of the Rochdale Canal Trust Ltd, and a large section was reconnected to the national waterways network in 1996 when Tuel Lane lock was built to replace locks 3 and 4, and a 114-yard (104 m) tunnel rejoined it to the Calder and Hebble. At 20 feet (6.1 m), the lock is the deepest on the English canal network. The final part of the restoration was partially funded by the Millennium Commission, and resulted in the canal being opened throughout in 2002.

Water supply was always a problem, and eight reservoirs were built to provide the volumes required. All of the locks were built with the same drop, which ensured that equal volumes of water were used at each lock, and it also meant that only one size of gate needed to be manufactured. Much of the canal is remote, and water supply is still a problem, as the reservoirs were sold to water supply companies when the canal was closed. Passage over the summit is restricted to four boats per day in each direction, is subject to water being available, and must be booked in advance. British Waterways staff assist boats between locks 36, the last one to the east of the summit, and 48, at Littleborough. The summit level is just on the Lancashire side of the border with Yorkshire, and is 601 feet (183 m) above sea level. Passage between locks 65 and 83 must also be booked, and is again restricted to four boats per day.

Below lock 83 at Ducie Street Junction, the canal is joined by the Ashton Canal, and the Outer Pennine Ring rejoins the North Pennine Ring. Nine locks, surrounded by urban Manchester, descend to Castlefield Junction, to complete the ring. The Rochdale Canal has 91 locks, reduced by one from the original total by Tuel Lane Lock, which replaced locks 3 and 4.

== See also ==
- Canals of the United Kingdom
- History of the British canal system
- Outer Pennine Ring

== Bibliography ==
- Boyes, John; Russell, Ronald (1977). The Canals of Eastern England. David and Charles. ISBN 978-0-7153-7415-3.
- Cumberlidge, Jane (2009). Inland Waterways of Great Britain (8th Ed.). Imray Laurie Norie and Wilson. ISBN 978-1-84623-010-3.
- Edwards, Lewis A (1985). Inland Waterways of Great Britain (6th Ed). Imray Laurie Norie and Wilson. ISBN 0-85288-081-2.
- Hadfield, Charles; Biddle, Gordon (1970). The Canals of North West England, Vol 1 (pp.1-236). David and Charles. ISBN 0-7153-4956-2.
- Nicholson (2006). Nicholson Waterways Guide (Vol 5): North West and the Pennines. Harper Collins. ISBN 0-00-721113-9.
- Shead, Jim (March 2004). "The Cheshire Ring". Waterways World. ISSN 0309-1422.
