= South Pennine Ring =

Canal ring in England

Coordinates: 53.679°N 1.819°W

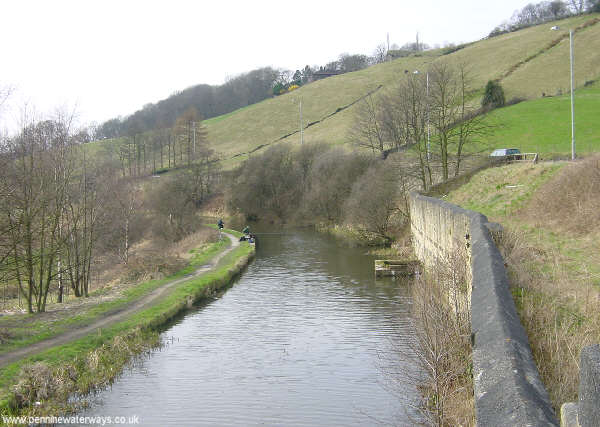
- The Rochdale Canal runs along the side of a hill at Brearley
- Interactive map of South Pennine Ring

Specifications
- Length: 69 miles (111 km)
- Locks: 197
- Status: Canal ring
- Navigation authority: Canal and River Trust

The South Pennine Ring is an English canal ring which crosses the Pennines between Manchester and Huddersfield. It covers parts of five canals, and includes passage through the longest canal tunnel in Britain. It has only been possible to cruise it since 2002, when restoration of the Huddersfield Narrow Canal provided the return route across the Pennines.

== History ==
The concept of a canal ring was created in 1965, as part of a campaign by the Inland Waterways Association to prevent the complete closure of the Rochdale Canal. Initially the canal was described as part of the "Cheshire Canal Ring", which was soon shortened to the "Cheshire Ring". It described a series of interconnecting canals which could be navigated, usually in a week or two, without having to cover any section twice, and has subsequently been applied to several other such routes. The South Pennine Ring is a recent addition, as it was only with the restoration of the Huddersfield Narrow Canal (dubbed the impossible restoration) and the Rochdale Canal in 2001-2002 that the ring became a possibility.

The term was coined as a marketing tool by British Waterways, and was later taken up by waterways enthusiasts in coining the North Pennine Ring and Outer Pennine Ring to describe the three possible rings that incorporate the three transpennine canals.

== Popularity ==
The moorland scenery and apparent isolation of the upper reaches of the ring would normally be a big attraction to leisure boaters, but boater numbers are relatively small due to a number of factors. These include

- the large numbers of locks, which are not generally clustered in flights
- unpredictable and planned engineering stoppages (as temporary closures are called on English canals), caused by water shortages, bank failures and maintenance work
- some densely urban sections being unpopular with people seeking rural England
- operating restrictions on the number of boats that can pass through the Standedge Tunnel.

As a result of the frequent stoppages and the need to book passage through the Standedge Tunnel, planning for a trip on the Huddersfield Narrow or Rochdale canals should include consulting the British Waterways website.

== Route ==
The South Pennine Ring follows parts of the following canals starting from Ducie St Junction in Manchester, and proceeding clockwise around the ring.

- Rochdale Canal
- Calder and Hebble Navigation
- Huddersfield Broad Canal
- Huddersfield Narrow Canal
- Ashton Canal

=== Rochdale Canal ===
The Rochdale Canal was authorised in 1794 and completed in 1804. Unlike the other two trans-Pennine canals, it does not have a major tunnel, but has to climb higher as a consequence, and the large number of locks, which were able to take wide-beam barges up to 14 feet (4.3 m) wide, used a prodigious amount of water, which often presented problems. The last commercial boat to travel from one end of the canal to the other did so in 1937, and most of the canal except for the section below Ducie St Junction, which is not part of the canal ring, was closed in 1952. Restoration began in 1984, and was completed in 2002 with the aid of a grant from the Millennium Fund. The canal remained in private ownership until 2000, and has been the responsibility of British Waterways since it reopened.

Originally, there were eight reservoirs which supplied water to the canal, but these were sold to water supply companies when the canal was closed, and so water supply is again a problem. For this reason, passage through the first 19 locks above Ducie St Junction, starting with lock 83, is restricted to four boats per day in each direction, and must be booked in advance. Making progress along the canal is hard work, as there are three locks per mile (5 locks per km), but they are spread out, rather than being organised into flights. There are a total of 47 locks between Ducie Street and the summit level, all constructed with the same rise, as a way to conserve water and to make the lock gates interchangeable. By the time West Summit Lock is reached, boats have travelled 17 miles (27 km) and ascended to a height of 601 feet (183 m), make this one of the highest canal summits in the country. Passage over the summit, between locks 37 to the west and 36 to the east, must again be booked and only four boats per day can make the passage in each direction. Although the lock at the western end of the summit is called West Summit Lock, the canal is actually travelling in a north to south direction at this point. The summit is quite short, at just 0.8 miles (1.3 km), and the descent to Sowerby Bridge begins all too soon.

The distance from Ducie Street to Sowerby Bridge is 30.8 miles (49.6 km) and there are 82 locks. The discrepancy between the locks and their numbers is because Tuel Lane Lock, just before Sowerby Bridge, was built as a single lock to replace the original locks 3 and 4, in order to give sufficient headroom as the canal passed under a road junction. Sowerby Bridge was historically a transshipment point, as the barges on the Calder and Hebble Navigation were only 56 feet (17 m) long, and this still restricts the size of boats that can complete the ring.

=== Calder and Hebble Navigation ===
The Calder and Hebble Navigation opened between Wakefield and Sowerby Bridge in 1770, almost as an extension to the Aire and Calder Navigation. It was never as successful as the Aire and Calder, and was leased by a railway company for a time, until the Aire and Calder took over the lease. Some of the lower locks were enlarged during this period, but this did not include any that form part of the South Pennine Ring. Commercial traffic lasted until 1981, and it is now used entirely for leisure boating. One unusual feature of the waterway is the need for a long piece of wood, called a handspike, to open the paddles on the locks. Because it is a river navigation, water levels are liable to fluctuate, and many of the locks have coloured gauge boards to indicate if it is safe to proceed. A green band indicates that river levels are normal, while an amber band indicates that river levels are high, but that progress to the next lock and passage through it should be possible with care. A red band indicates that navigation is unsafe, as the river is in flood, and the next lock is closed.

When the river levels are normal, travelling along the canal is a pleasant experience, as the route passes through areas of beautiful countryside and other areas with interesting industrial archaeology. After 8.5 miles (13.7 km) and 14 locks, the channel forks. The Calder and Hebble proceeds straight ahead through Cooper Bridge flood gates to reach the Aire and Calder at Wakefield. That route is part of the North Pennine Ring, which uses the Leeds and Liverpool Canal to re-cross the Pennines. The South Pennine Ring takes a left turn onto the Huddersfield Broad Canal. Care is needed as there is a large weir beside the entrance to the first lock.

=== Huddersfield Broad Canal ===
The Huddersfield Broad Canal is relatively short, at just 3.3 miles (5.3 km), and ascends through 9 locks to connect the Calder and Hebble to the industrial centre of Huddersfield. It was opened in 1780, and features short wide locks, as its only outlet was via Cooper Bridge when it was built. Despite the proximity of towns the route feels quite rural, with wooded banks and playing fields close by. It reaches Aspley Basin after passing the Locomotive Lift Bridge, named because of its shape rather than its function, as it carries a road over the canal. The basin was required once the Huddersfield Narrow Canal opened, as boats using either canal could not proceed along the other.

=== Huddersfield Narrow Canal ===
The Huddersfield Narrow Canal was the third of the trans-Pennine routes to open. It was authorised at the same time as the Rochdale Canal, but had a long tunnel on the summit level, and was not fully opened until 1811, seven years after the Rochdale. Standedge tunnel is the longest canal tunnel in Britain, and also the highest, as the summit level is 656 feet (200 m) above sea level. This is higher than the summit of the Rochdale, and yet it is also the deepest canal tunnel, as it is 638 feet (194 m) below Saddleworth Moor in places.

The canal is 19.9 miles (32.0 km) long, with 42 locks, numbered 1E to 42E up to the summit level, and another 32, numbered 32W to 1W on the descent to Dukinfield Junction. Near to Huddersfield there are two tunnels, constructed to take the reinstated canal under factories which were built after it closed in 1944. Bates Tunnel is 100 yards (91 m) long, and Sellers Tunnel is 355 yards (325 m) long. As on the Rochdale, the locks are spread out rather than occurring in flights. Between the top lock and the north-east portal of Standedge Tunnel there is around 0.5 miles (0.8 km) of level canal. Near the tunnel mouth is an information centre. There are four tunnels running through the hills at this point, as the canal tunnel is paralleled by three railway tunnels. Passage through the tunnel must be booked in advance, and is limited to a convoy of four boats in each direction on days when the tunnel is open.

The reconstruction of the canal has made big changes to places such as Stalybridge, where the canal was culverted in 1947. Now the new canal threads through the streets, and it is appreciated for the vibrancy it has created. Below the final lock is another tunnel, 166 yards (152 m) long, which carries the canal under an Asda supermarket to reach Dukinfield Junction.

=== Ashton Canal ===
At Dukinfield Junction, the Peak Forest Canal turns to the left, but the South Pennine Ring continues straight ahead onto the Ashton Canal. The first half is level, until Fairfield Junction is reached. This was the point at which the Hollinwood Canal turned off. A short section of it now leads to a new marina, opened in 2008, and there are plans to reopen more of it. Between locks 10 and 11 is a short stub which used to be part of the Stockport Canal, for which there are also reopening plans. After descending through 18 locks and travelling 6.7 miles (10.8 km), the Ashton Canal arrives back at the starting point where it joins the Rochdale Canal at Ducie Street Junction.

== See also ==
- Canals of the United Kingdom
- History of the British canal system
- North Pennine Ring
- Outer Pennine Ring

== Bibliography ==
- Cumberlidge, Jane (2009). Inland Waterways of Great Britain (8th Ed.). Imray Laurie Norie and Wilson. ISBN 978-1-84623-010-3.
- Nicholson (2006). Nicholson Waterways Guide (Vol 5): North West and the Pennines. Harper Collins. ISBN 978-0-00-721113-5.
- Shead, Jim (March 2004). "The Cheshire Ring". Waterways World. ISSN 0309-1422. Archived from the original on 3 March 2016.
