= New Junction Canal =

Canal in South Yorkshire, England

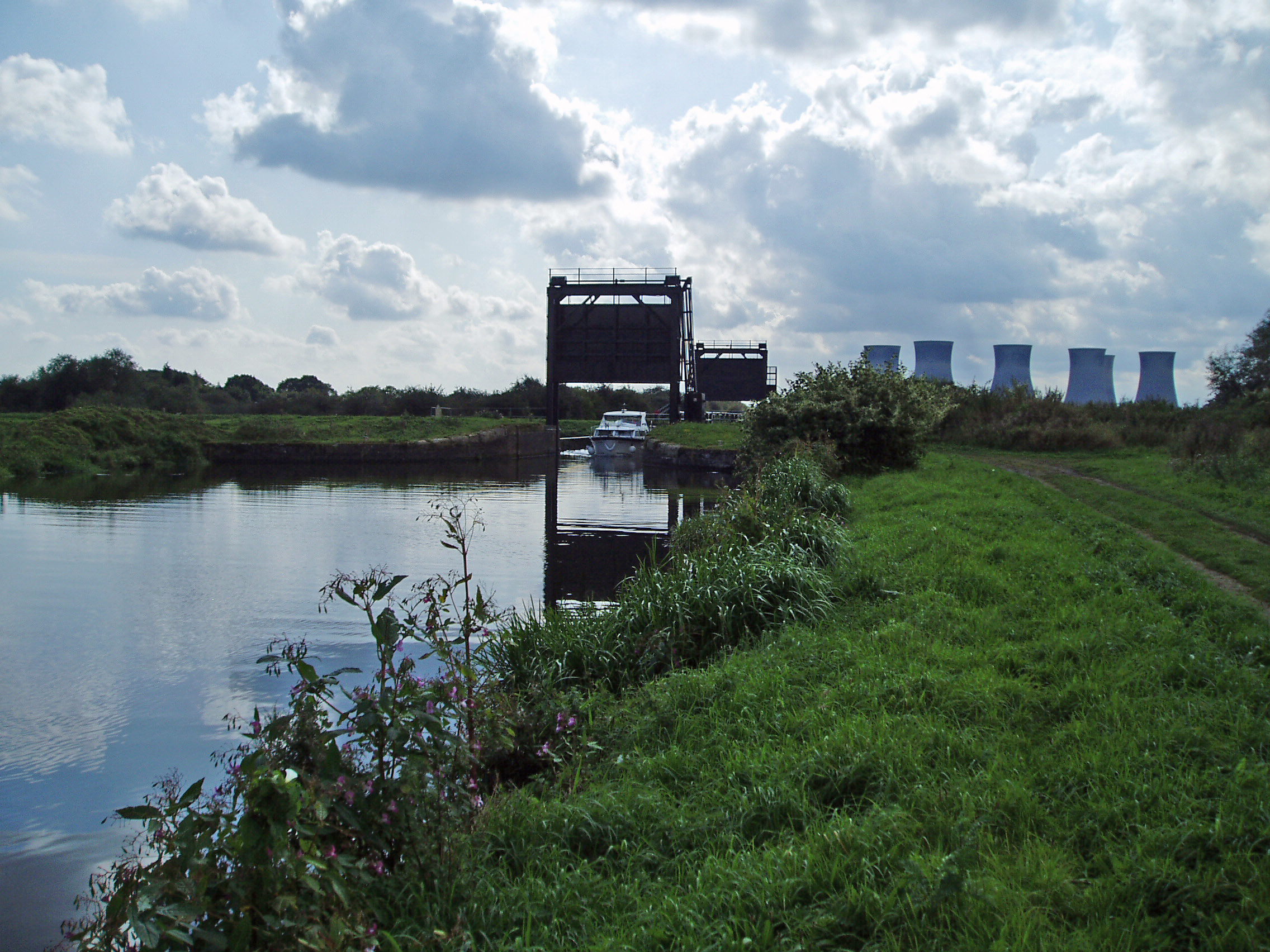
- Guillotine gates protect the canal from the River Don

Specifications
- Maximum boat length: 215 ft 0 in (65.53 m)
- Maximum boat beam: 22 ft 6 in (6.86 m)
- Locks: 1
- Status: Operational
- Navigation authority: Canal and River Trust

History
- Original owner: Aire and Calder Navigation, Sheffield and South Yorkshire Navigation Co
- Date of act: 1891
- Date of first use: 1905

Geography
- Start point: River Don
- End point: Aire and Calder
- Connects to: Aire and Calder Navigation, River Don Navigation

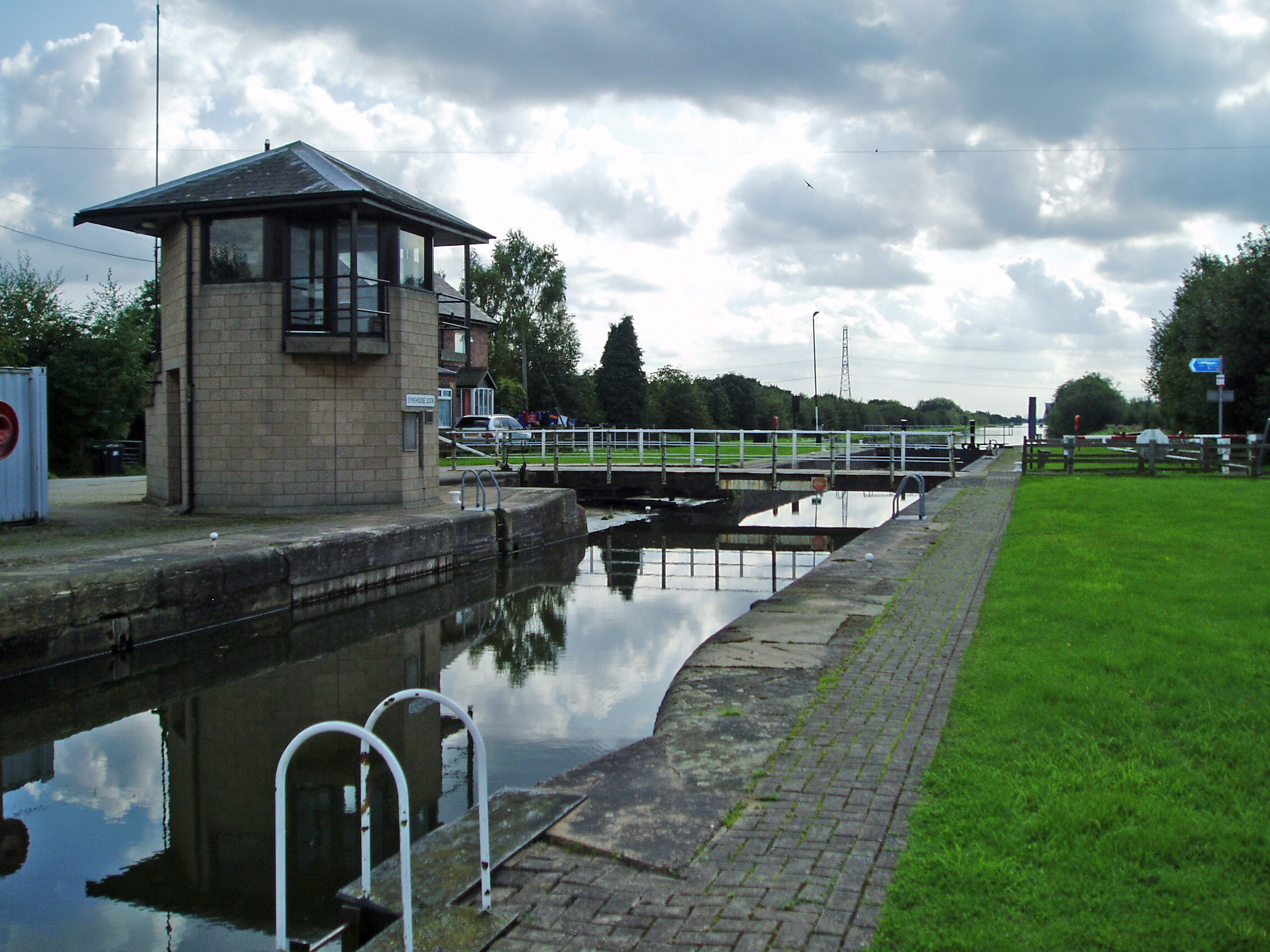
Sykehouse Lock, with a swing bridge crossing its centre

The New Junction Canal is a canal in South Yorkshire, England. It is part of the Sheffield and South Yorkshire Navigation (S&SYN), although it was jointly funded by the Aire and Calder Navigation and was opened in 1905. It links the River Don Navigation and the Stainforth and Keadby Canal with the Aire and Calder Navigation (Knottingley Canal). It is straight and was the last canal built in England for commercial purposes.

The canal has one lock, which was sized to allow the compartment boats of the Aire and Calder to use it. Still, the owning company needed to raise more money to upgrade the River Don Navigation beyond, and the Long Sandall lock prevented the working of such boats through to Doncaster until it was rebuilt in 1959. There is still some commercial traffic on the canal, but most of its use is now by leisure boaters. One notable feature is the aqueduct over the River Don, protected by large guillotine gates, which can be lowered when the Don is in spate to prevent the surrounding countryside from being flooded.

== History ==
The New Junction Canal was conceived when there was dissatisfaction with the state of the waterways in Sheffield and Doncaster, which were then under the ownership of the Manchester, Sheffield and Lincolnshire Railway. Steam-powered boats were still prohibited from using the waterways in 1888, even though they had been in use on the neighbouring Aire and Calder Navigation for over 50 years, and the railway company had set rates for using the canal considerably higher than those for using the railway. The President of the Sheffield Chamber of Commerce invited the engineer Charles Hawksley and B. P. Broomhead, an influential Sheffield solicitor, to a meeting of the Chamber on 16 August 1888, at which he outlined the situation. A committee was appointed, which met on 20 August and decided that a new independent canal was needed to connect Sheffield, Rotherham, and Doncaster to the sea to maintain the profitability of the local coalfields.

By October, a report had been produced, which suggested that the locks on the canal from Sheffield to Keadby were too small and that the waterway could be greatly improved by building new locks besides the existing ones, capable of holding boats that could carry 300 or 500 tons. Believing that such locks could be built without disrupting traffic, the estimated costs of the works were £1 million, in addition to which the existing waterways would need to be acquired. The Sheffield and South Yorkshire Canal Company Ltd was registered on 15 November 1888 to obtain an act of Parliament to authorise this work. The Sheffield and South Yorkshire Navigation Act 1889 (52 & 53 Vict. c. cxc) was passed on 26 August 1889, which created the Sheffield and South Yorkshire Navigation Company, who had powers to raise £1.5 million, and to buy the four South Yorkshire canals, consisting of the Sheffield Canal, the River Don Navigation, the Stainforth and Keadby Canal and the Dearne and Dove Canal. They had nine months to negotiate with the railway owners and could resort to compulsory purchase afterward. To demonstrate their resolve, £20,000 had to be deposited within six months of the date of the act.

By this stage, the plan was to enlarge the waterways to enable 300 or 400-ton barges to navigate and make the locks suitable for compartment boat trains, as used on the Aire and Calder. New facilities would be built at Keadby, where the canal joined the River Trent so that coal could be trans-shipped to larger vessels. Negotiations with the railway company began, but they refused to cooperate. Instead, they waited nine months until the compulsory purchase option was possible and took court action against the canal company once the purchase order was served. The canal company sought assistance from the Court of the Railway and Canal Commission, who ruled in their favour, and the railway company finally produced the details of their ownership in early 1891.

Aire and Calder and River Dun Navigation Junction Canal Act 1891
- Act of Parliament
- Parliament of the United Kingdom
- Long title: An Act to authorise the Undertakers of the Navigation of the Rivers of Aire and Calder in the West Riding of the County of York to make a new Canal from the River Dun Navigation to join the Knottingley and Goole Canal and to widen a portion of the last-mentioned Canal to provide for the Sheffield and South Yorkshire Navigation Company becoming joint owners of the new Canal and for other purposes.
- Citation: 54 & 55 Vict. c. clxx

Dates
- Royal assent: 28 July 1891

Text of statute as originally enacted

Using compartment boats led to discussions with the Aire and Calder Navigation Company. Consequently, it was decided to abandon the plan to develop Keadby and instead use the existing port facilities at Goole. As the Sheffield and South Yorkshire Navigation Company had yet to take control of any canals, an agreement was negotiated, which would see the Aire and Calder obtaining an act of Parliament to authorise the construction of a 5.5-mile (8.9 km) straight canal from Bramwith on the River Don to a point some 7 miles (11 km) above Goole. The Aire and Calder and River Dun Navigation Junction Canal Act 1891 (54 & 55 Vict. c. clxx) was obtained on 28 July 1891 and specified that the S&SYN could become joint owners and subscribers, once they had acquired the four waterways from the railway company. Transfer of the canals was finally agreed on 31 July 1894, at a cost to the canal company of £1.14 million, of which £600,000 was to be paid in cash. The company managed to raise £625,000 through the issue of preference shares, but the rest of the purchase price was held as ordinary shares by the railway company, who were then able to appoint five of the ten directors. Due to continued railway involvement, the Aire and Calder did not invest in the new company, which took control of the four waterways on 1 March 1895. The Aire and Calder, meanwhile, had not started to build the New Junction Canal, but they had extended the time allowed to purchase land for its construction through another Act of Parliament.

The new company struggled to raise the finance for the New Junction construction and for the River Don Navigation improvements to allow larger boats to use it. The canal was completed on 2 January 1905, at a total cost of £300,000, shared between the Sheffield and South Yorkshire and the Aire and Calder companies. It was the last canal to be built in England for commercial purposes.

== Operation ==
The canal helped to increase traffic on the River Don from 835,982 tons to 961,774 tons between 1905 and 1913. Income from tolls over the same period rose from £48,981 to £53,586. Although the River Don was straightened at Doncaster in 1905 and at Sprotborough in 1907, traffic on the New Junction canal was hindered by the size of the locks on the river. Doncaster lock was extended in 1909 and 1910, but although trains of 17-compartment boats could then use both Sykehouse and Doncaster locks, they had to be split up at Long Sandall lock, which was between the two, as they could only pass through it three at a time. Traffic to Hatfield Main colliery was improved between 1930 and 1932 when Bramwith lock, the first on the Stainforth and Keady Canal, was lengthened to allow compartment boats from the New Junction to reach it. The work, which included a colliery lay-by, cost £20,000. Doncaster Corporation paid most of the cost of straightening the river there and building a 300-foot (91 m) wharf and warehouse, which opened in 1934.

Further improvements had to wait until after the canals were nationalised in 1948. Long Sandall lock was lengthened and widened to 215 by 22 feet (65.5 by 6.7 m) in 1959, enabling compartment boats to work through to Doncaster and Hexthorpe without having to be split for the first time. Although traffic is much reduced, there is still some commercial activity on the canal.

== Features ==
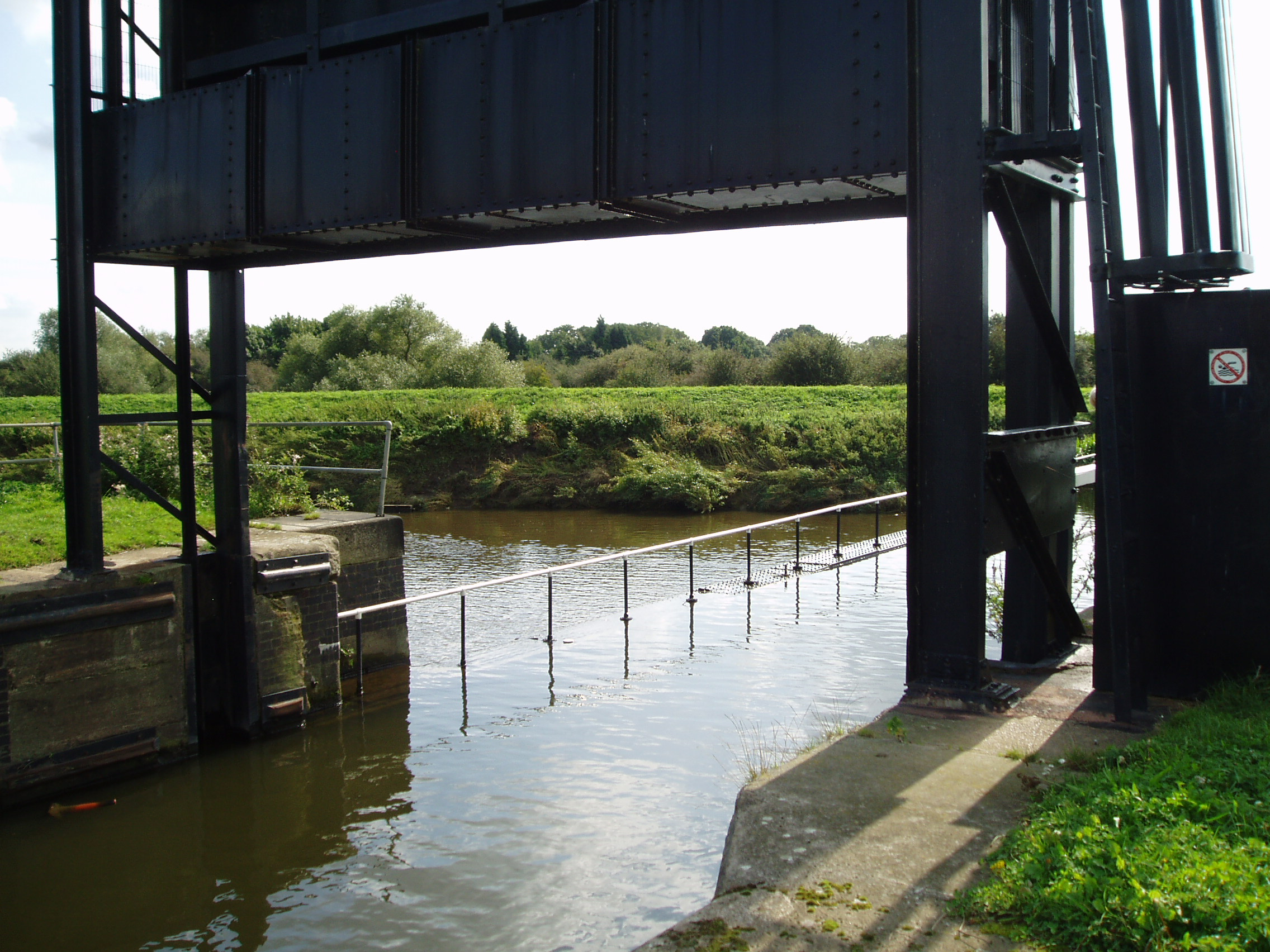
The canal overflowing the Don aqueduct into the river below

The canal is straight for its entire length, and the surrounding countryside is relatively flat. It has one lock, five swing or lift bridges and is carried across two aqueducts. At its northern end it crosses the River Went, while at its southern end it crosses the River Don. The River Don aqueduct looks precarious, as the canal regularly overflows the eastern side of the structure, and there only appears to be railings preventing the boats from falling down into the river below. Both ends of the aqueduct are protected by large guillotine gates, which are there to prevent the river overflowing the canal when it is in spate, and flooding the surrounding countryside.

For the boater, the most notable feature is the complicated operation of Sykehouse Lock. The lock is automated but the control system is disabled until the manually operated swing bridge over the top of it has been opened.

The region through which the canal flows is sparsely populated, as there are no major towns, and just two main villages. The civil parish of Sykehouse, which includes a number of outlying settlements, straddles the northern end of the canal, and Kirk Bramwith is at the southern end. For much of its length, the towpath forms part of the route for the Trans Pennine Trail which joins it at Top Lane lift bridge, crosses to the east bank at Sykehouse lock, and leaves at Sykehouse lift bridge.

== Points of interest ==
Point	Coordinates (Links to map resources)	OS Grid Ref	Notes
Junction with Aire and Calder Canal	53.6611°N 1.0157°W	SE651187	
Sykehouse lift bridge	53.6485°N 1.0268°W	SE644173	
Sykehouse lock	53.6375°N 1.0358°W	SE638160	
Top Lane lift bridge	53.6058°N 1.0626°W	SE621125	
River Don aqueduct	53.5949°N 1.0723°W	SE615113	
Junction with River Don Navigation	53.5904°N 1.0757°W	SE612108	

== See also ==
- Canals of the United Kingdom
- History of the British canal system

== Bibliography ==
- Cumberlidge, Jane (2009). Inland Waterways of Great Britain (8th Ed.). Imray Laurie Norie and Wilson. ISBN 978-1-84623-010-3.
- Hadfield, Charles (1973). The Canals of Yorkshire and North East England (Vol 2). David and Charles. ISBN 0-7153-5975-4.
- Nicholson (2006). Nicholson Guides (Vol 6): Nottingham, York and the North East. Harper Collins Publishers. ISBN 978-0-00-721114-2.
