= Sheffield and South Yorkshire Navigation =

System of navigable inland waterways in South Yorkshire and Lincolnshire, England

Coordinates: 53°23′N 1°28′W

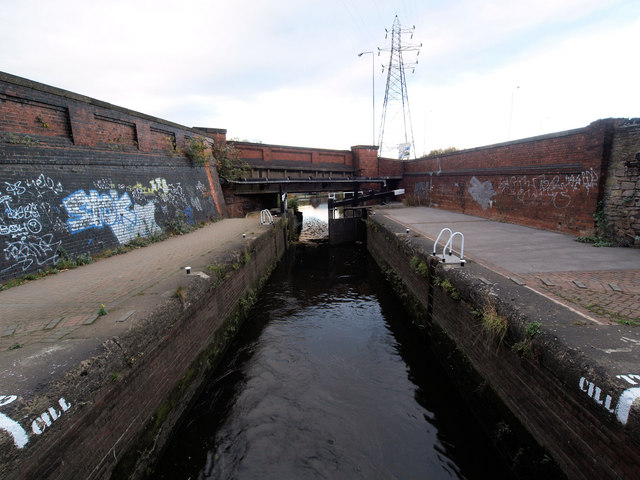
- A section of the lock flight up to Sheffield
- Interactive map of Sheffield and South Yorkshire Navigation

Specifications
- Navigation authority: Canal and River Trust

History
- Original owner: (Took over existing waterways)
- Date of act: 1889
- Date of first use: 1895

Geography
- Start point: Sheffield
- End point: Keadby or Aire and Calder Navigation
- Connects to: River Trent, Aire and Calder Navigation

The Sheffield and South Yorkshire Navigation (S&SY) is a system of navigable inland waterways (canals and canalised rivers) in South Yorkshire and Lincolnshire, England.

Chiefly based on the River Don, it runs for a length of 43 miles (69 km) and has 27 locks. It connects Sheffield, Rotherham, and Doncaster with the River Trent at Keadby and (via the New Junction Canal) the Aire and Calder Navigation.

The system consisted of five parts, four of which are still open to navigation today:-

- The River Don Navigation
- The Sheffield Canal (effectively abandoned in the early 1970s but revitalised since the 1990s)
- The Stainforth and Keadby Canal
- The New Junction Canal
- The Dearne and Dove Canal (closed 1961)

== History ==
The River Don is known to have been navigable up to Doncaster as early as 1343, when a commission looked at the problems caused by bridges and weirs. It underwent major changes in the 1620s, when Cornelius Vermuyden closed the channel which crossed Hatfield Chase to reach the River Trent at Adlingfleet, and diverted all of the water northwards to the River Aire. Following flooding and riots, a new outlet was cut from Newbridge to Goole, which was known as the Dutch River. Serious thought was given to improving the river from 1691, but disagreements between groups from Doncaster, Rotherham and Sheffield prevented progress. Finally, the Sheffield Cutlers obtained an act of Parliament, the River Dun Navigation Act 1725 (12 Geo. 1. c. 38) in 1726 to improve the river up to Tinsley. Doncaster Corporation then obtained an act in 1727, the River Dun Navigation Act 1726 (13 Geo. 1. c. 20) to authorise improvements below Doncaster.

The Dutch River was difficult to navigate, and in 1793, the Stainforth and Keadby Canal was authorised, to provide a link from the Don at Stainforth to the Trent at Keadby. Although notionally independent, it was effectively under the control of the Don Navigation when it opened, probably in 1802. The Dearne and Dove Canal was also authorised in 1793, from Swinton to Barnsley, and was again under Don Navigation control, since most of the shareholders were also shareholders in the Don. A canal from Tinsley into Sheffield was delayed for years by opposition from the Don Navigation, but was authorised in 1815 and opened in 1819.

By the 1840s, there were a number of proposals to build railways in the region, and the River Don Navigation Company acted to ensure they would remain in business. An attempted takeover of the Barnsley Canal in 1845 was not concluded, but gave them some bargaining power while it appeared likely. They bought out the Dearne and Dove Canal in 1846, and acquired the Sheffield Canal from the Manchester, Sheffield and Lincolnshire Railway in 1848, which, as the Sheffield and Lincolnshire Junction Railway, a predecessor and constituent company, had bought it in 1846. After protracted negotiations, they absorbed the Stainforth and Keadby Canal in 1849. They then amalgamated with the South Yorkshire, Doncaster and Goole Railway in 1850, to become the South Yorkshire Railway and River Dun Company. This in turn was leased to the Manchester, Sheffield and Lincolnshire Railway for 999 years in 1864. By the 1880s, there was dissatisfaction among the users that the rates for traffic were higher than on the railways, and the canals were failing to modernise, as steam boats were banned, despite them having been in use for 50 years on the neighbouring Aire and Calder Navigation.

=== Formation ===
With the Manchester Ship Canal under construction, and other large canals being proposed, a committee was formed to investigate a new canal from Sheffield to the sea. T & C Hawksley, assisted by James Abernethy, were asked to report on whether a canal from Sheffield suitable for medium-sized coasters could be built, to the Ouse, the Trent or the Humber. Their report, presented in October 1888, suggested that the existing locks on the route from Sheffield to Keadby were inadequate, but that the waterway could be upgraded to take 300- to 500-ton boats by building new locks alongside the old, without disrupting traffic. The estimated cost of this work, which included a new canal from Tinsley to Sheffield, but did not include buying the canals from the railway company, was put at £1 million. The Sheffield and South Yorkshire Canal Company Limited was formed in November 1888, with a capital of £30,000, to promote this new venture and obtain the necessary act of Parliament.

Sheffield and South Yorkshire Navigation Act 1889
- Act of Parliament
- Parliament of the United Kingdom
- Long title: An Act to provide for an Improved Water Communication between Sheffield Rotherham Doncaster the South Yorkshire Coalfields and the Sea; and for other purposes.
- Citation: 52 & 53 Vict. c. cxc

Dates
- Royal assent: 26 August 1889

Text of statute as originally enacted

The new company obtained an act of Parliament, the Sheffield and South Yorkshire Navigation Act 1889 (52 & 53 Vict. c. cxc) on 26 August 1889, creating the Sheffield and South Yorkshire Navigation Company, which was authorised to raise £1.5 million and to purchase the four canals either by negotiation, or by compulsory purchase if after nine months negotiations with the railway company had failed to reach an agreement. They could also improve the canals they bought, or build new ones, and could also act as inland carriers. The intent was to rebuild the Don and the Stainforth and Keadby routes to allow 300- or 400-ton barges to be used, and to develop coal-handling facilities at Keadby so that it would rival Goole on the Aire and Calder Navigation. In addition, the Dearne and Dove Canal would be dredged, so that compartment boats, like those on the Aire and Calder, could be used for the transport of coal.

The railway company was unwilling to sell, and did nothing until the initial nine-month period had passed. When a notice was served under the terms of the act, which required them to sell the canals, they attempted to obstruct the new company by taking legal action against them. In 1891, the courts found in favour of the canal company, but negotiations dragged on. Meanwhile, negotiations had also taken place with the Aire and Calder, and an agreement had been reached to connect the two systems together by a 5.5-mile (9 km) canal, so that the improved Don could use Goole for the export of coal, rather than having to develop Keadby. By 1893, agreement had been reached as to what the railway company was selling, and a price of £1.14 million had been fixed, of which £600,000 was to be paid in cash. The rest could be paid in shares in the new company, which would give the railway places on the board unless the canal company bought all of the shares back. This was enshrined in the Sheffield and South Yorkshire Navigation Act 1894 (57 & 58 Vict. c. cxlvii) obtained on 31 July 1894, but the clause about railway representation meant that the Aire and Calder declined to purchase any shares, and the company struggled to raise the capital.

The new company finally took over the four canals on 1 March 1895. It had only succeeded in raising £625,000, which was less than the purchase price of the canals. The railway company therefore nominated half of the ten directors, and there was no capital to fund the ambitious plans for the modernisation of the system, although some further developments took place.

=== Development ===
While the company had hoped to have £1 million to fund improvements, there was no working capital, and the enlargement of the locks to take 300- or 500-ton barges did not take place. The largest boats that could be accommodated were 110-ton vessels, although some of the locks were lengthened to take compartment boats. The Dearne and Dove Canal was regularly affected by subsidence, causing a drain on limited resources. In 1906, the Worsbrough branch ceased to be navigable, and became just a water feeder, and in 1909, the company effectively conceded defeat, by allowing coal to be mined under the canal. The Elsacar Branch closed in 1928, and most of the rest of the canal was closed in 1934, although formal closure did not take place until 1961.

Despite the lack of capital, the new company somehow managed to finance improvements to Sheffield Basin, including a four-storey warehouse which straddled part of the basin. Banks were raised and the canals were dredged, and for the first and only time, tonnage carried exceeded one million tons in 1896. They were also faced with the prospect of funding their half of the New Junction Canal, to provide the connection with the Aire and Calder Navigation. This was achieved by creating £150,000 of debenture stock and by mortgages. The final cost of the new canal when it was opened on 2 January 1905 had been £300,000 shared between the two companies. Some straightening of the navigation near Doncaster had been carried out, but they noted that more would be required at Sprotborough and Doncaster to make full use of compartment boats. Between 1905 and 1913, traffic rose from 835,982 tons to 961,774 tons, despite the fact that the system was antiquated and made little use of motor barges until after the First World War. West Riding County Council, who reported on its state in 1907 as part of the Royal Commission on Canals, blamed the inadequacies on the fact that the navigation was virtually controlled by the Great Central Railway. Doncaster lock was extended in 1909 and 1910, and improvements were made at Doncaster, Rotherham and Tinsley, but trade declined significantly with the onset of the First World War, as many of the steam trawlers which had previously used coal from the waterway were requisitioned by the Admiralty, and were fuelled elsewhere.

As the war drew towards its end, the Corporation of Sheffield pushed for major improvements to the system. While they thought that the waterway should be nationalised, they were in principle willing to part-fund improvements providing control by the railway company was ended. They commissioned Sir John Wolfe-Barry, Lyster and Partners to produce a report in 1919, and from the options suggested, chose to promote one of them. This involved increasing the depth of the waterway from Tinsley to Keadby to 8 feet (2.4 m), making the channel wider and straighter, rebuilding the bridges to give more room through them, and replacing the locks with eighteen new ones, each 270 by 22 feet (82.3 by 6.7 m). They were to be fitted with multiple gates, and be sized for 300-ton craft or four 110-ton barges. The estimated cost for these improvements was £1,483,426, but the economic circumstances of the time meant that the government was not prepared to support the scheme, and whereas the neighbouring Corporation of Nottingham funded improvements to the River Trent without government support, Sheffield were not prepared to do the same for the Don. There were also proposals for a ship canal from Doncaster to Trent Falls at the same time.

=== Nationalisation ===
In 1948 the company was nationalised and became a part of British Waterways. By the 1960s traffic was dwindling and the official head of the main line of the navigation became the new steelworks at Aldwarke, below Rotherham. Repeated proposals were made in the 1960s and 1970s to upgrade the system to allow larger vessels as far as Rotherham. Go-ahead was finally given in the early 1980s: the channel was deepened to 8 feet and the locks were rebuilt to take 700-ton vessels. A new wharf and freight terminal were built in Rotherham utilising the disused riverside bus depot as warehousing; various other facilities on the navigation below Rotherham were upgraded. The improvements were opened in 1983. Although these have received traffic sporadically since (and are still used in a limited fashion today), the upgrade was not the success that was hoped.

By the 1970s, boats rarely ventured above Rotherham. The effort made in the 1980s to attract traffic to the waterway below Rotherham did not extend to the stretch above the town: the locks remained suitable only for much smaller barges. Over time parts of the Sheffield Canal gradually slid towards dereliction through lack of use. In 1990 there was a concerted effort by Sheffield City Council and British Waterways to revitalise the waterway, which brought traffic back to a redeveloped Sheffield Basin (now focussed on leisure and commercial activities and renamed Victoria Quays).

Today the system is open to navigation throughout the main line, the Stainforth and Keadby and New Junction canals, and is mostly used for leisure boating. Some commercial carrying does take place from the quarry at Cadeby and the wharves at Rotherham and Doncaster; plus there is an active commercial barge-yard at Swinton and leisure boatyard and boatbuilder at Sheffield. In 2008–09 the system carried 290,000 tonnes of freight, of which 266,100 tonnes were limestone from Cadeby.

The Rother Link is a scheme that would see the River Rother upgraded to navigable status from Rotherham as far as Killamarsh, where a short canal would link to the Chesterfield Canal to complete a leisure cruising circuit. A canal restoration group is also seeking the re-opening of the Dearne and Dove Canal, has performed some restoration work at Elsecar and commissioned an engineer's report into reopening.

== See also ==
- Canals of the United Kingdom
- History of the British canal system

== Bibliography ==
- Hadfield, Charles (1972). The Canals of Yorkshire and North East England (Vol 1). David and Charles. ISBN 978-0-7153-5719-4.
- Hadfield, Charles (1973). The Canals of Yorkshire and North East England (Vol 2). David and Charles. ISBN 978-0-7153-5975-4.
- Nicholson (2006). Nicholson Guides Vol 6: Nottingham York and the North East. Harper Collins. ISBN 978-0-00-721114-2.
