= Outer Pennine Ring =

Canal ring in England

Coordinates: 53°28′57″N 2°05′59″W

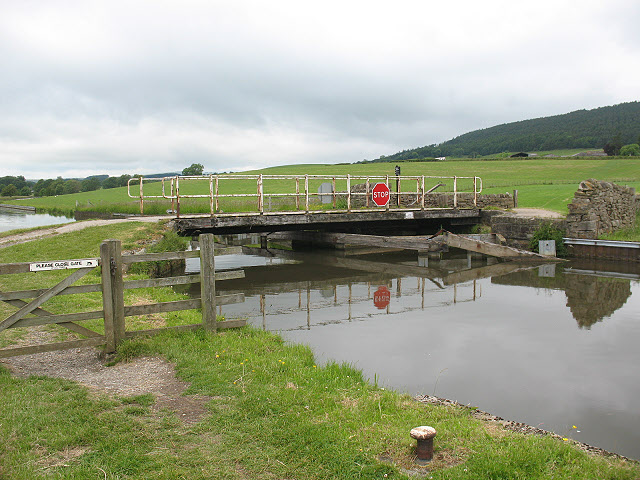
- Highgate Bridge near Gargrave, on one of the remote sections of the Leeds and Liverpool Canal
- Interactive map of Outer Pennine Ring

Specifications
- Length: 175 miles (282 km)
- Locks: 220
- Status: Canal ring
- Navigation authority: Canal and River Trust, Peel Holdings

The Outer Pennine Ring is an English canal ring which crosses the Pennines between Manchester, Leeds and Castleford. Its route follows parts of eight canals, and includes the longest canal tunnel in England. The ring was completed in 2001, with the opening of the Huddersfield Narrow Canal. Much of the route is shared with the North Pennine Ring, which crosses the Pennines by a different route on the southern leg.

== History ==
The concept of a canal ring was created in 1965, as part of a campaign by the Inland Waterways Association to prevent the complete closure of the Rochdale Canal. Initially the canal was described as part of the "Cheshire Canal Ring", which was soon shortened to the "Cheshire Ring". It described a series of interconnecting canals which could be navigated, usually in a week or two, without having to cover any section twice, and has subsequently been applied to several other such routes. The Outer Pennine Ring is a recent addition, as it was only with the restoration of the Huddersfield Narrow Canal in 2001 that the ring became a possibility.

The term was coined by enthusiasts as an adjunct to the South Pennine Ring, devised as a marketing tool by British Waterways.

== Route ==
The Outer Pennine Ring covers eight canals. Working clockwise from Castlefield Junction in Manchester these are:

- Bridgewater Canal
- Leeds and Liverpool Canal
- Aire and Calder Navigation
- Calder and Hebble Navigation
- Huddersfield Broad Canal
- Huddersfield Narrow Canal
- Ashton Canal
- Rochdale Canal

=== Bridgewater Canal ===
Beginning at Castlefield Junction, the Bridgewater Canal heads south-east through the urban expanse of Manchester. There are no locks on this section of canal, although after 1.2 miles (1.9 km) Pomona Dock is reached, which leads to a lock through which access can be gained to the Manchester Ship Canal. After 2.8 miles (4.5 km), the canal arrives at Waters Meeting, a junction where the main line turns to the left and the Stretford and Leigh Branch turns to the right. The ring continues along the branch for 10.8 miles (17.4 km) to arrive at Leigh, where there is an end-on junction with the Leeds and Liverpool Leigh Branch. On its way, the Barton Swing Aqueduct carries it across the Manchester Ship Canal. The structure was designed by Sir Edward Leader Williams in the 1890s, and allows a 235-foot (72 m) section of the canal, weighing 1450 tons, to move out of the way of ships using the ship canal. The Bridgewater Canal is owned by the Manchester Ship Canal, although boats with a British Waterways licence may use it for up to seven days without further payment.

=== Leigh Branch ===
The Leigh Branch of the Leeds and Liverpool Canal runs for 7.3 miles (11.7 km), mostly through a landscape which has been severely affected by mining. For most of its length, the canal is on top of an embankment, which has been repeatedly built up with mining waste as the land on either side has been affected by subsidence. The region has been restored as parkland, and now offers a haven for wildlife. There was originally a lock at Plank Lane and another two at the Dover Lock Inn, but all three have been removed and replaced by the two Poolstock locks, situated just before the branch joins the main line at Wigan. At Wigan Junction, the main line to Liverpool turns to the left, while the ring turns to the right and follows the main line to Leeds.

=== Leeds and Liverpool Canal ===
Almost immediately after the junction, 21 locks raise the level of the canal by 215 feet (66 m). At the top of the flight is a T-junction. This section of canal was built by the Lancaster Canal, but was never connected to the northern section except by a tramway. The right hand branch is just a stub, and the ring turns to the left. The pound is level for 9 miles (14 km), and the next locks start where the Lancaster Canal Walton Summit Branch turned to the north. The seven Johnson's Hill Locks raise the level of the canal by another 65.5 feet (20.0 m). As the canal continues to the east, there is a mix of industrial development, green fields and wild moorlands. Above Blackburn, the route twists tortuously to negotiate a series of hills.

On the outskirts of Burnley, the canal passes through the 559-yard (511 m) Gannow Tunnel, before turning to the north. At Barrowford, another flight of seven locks raise the canal by 69 feet (21 m) to the summit level. Barrowford Reservoir holds surplus water from the summit level. Soon, Foulridge Tunnel burrows through the hillside for 1,640 yards (1,500 m). It was the scene of a famous incident in 1912 when a cow fell into the canal, and proceeded to swim through to Foulridge, where it was given alcohol to revive it. The summit is only level for 6.1 miles (9.8 km), before the descent towards Leeds begins.

Above Gargrave, the canal crosses the River Aire, and the canal follows the river valley all the way to Leeds. At Skipton, the canal is joined by the short Springs Branch or Thanet Canal, named after the Earl of Thanet who built it and who owned Skipton Castle, which overlooks it. The canal runs level for 16.8 miles (27.0 km) from Gargrave to Bingley, after which two staircases of locks, the Bingley Five Rise and the Bingley Three Rise lower the level by 90 feet (27 m). Shortly afterwards, the canal crosses the Aire, and remains to its south for the rest of its route. Several more locks, grouped in twos and threes, with some single ones, continue to lower the level until Leeds is reached, where River Lock connects the canal to the River Aire and the Aire and Calder Navigation. Between Wigan junction and Leeds, the canal covers 92 miles (148 km) and there are 85 locks, 41 to the west of the summit and 44 to the east.

=== Aire and Calder Navigation ===
The Aire and Calder Navigation is on a different scale to the Leeds and Liverpool Canal, with locks 200 by 20 feet (61.0 by 6.1 m), and because it is a river navigation, there is a flow and the locks are accompanied by weirs. It is still used by 600-tonne tankers and barges carrying sand, which create considerably more wash than a narrowboat, and in times of heavy rainfall, the navigation may be closed, with flood gates closed, until the volume of water drops to a safe level again. The locks are mechanically operated, but although there are lock-keepers, they tend to move from lock to lock to assist commercial boats, and those using the river for pleasure can operate the locks themselves.

At Knostrop, the navigation enters its own channel, with the river to the north, and it remains separate for 7 miles (11 km) until the two rejoin at Lemonroyd. Much of the route is through a mining landscape, with spoil heaps and flooded pits. Near Lemonroyd, there was a disastrous failure of the river bank in 1988, which resulted in the river emptying into the St Aidens opencast colliery. A little further on, the Leeds arm arrives at Castleford Junction, with three other routes. Straight ahead leads to Castleford weir, and no boats should enter that section. To the left is a flood lock and the route to Goole. The ring turns to the right, along the Wakefield branch, which is effectively a canalisation of the River Calder. The distance from Leeds to Castleford is 10 miles (16 km) and there are six locks, although Knostrop Flood Lock normally has both sets of gates open.

The first lock on the Calder section is at Woodnock, and an idea of the improvements made over the years can be obtained by comparing its size to that of the disused Fairies and Altofts locks, on a branch to the south. At Stanley Ferry, two aqueducts carry the navigation over the Calder, the newer one of which was opened in 1981 to prevent damage to the older one by large barges. After 7.5 miles (12.1 km) and four locks, the navigation arrives at Fall Ing Lock, the junction between the Aire and Calder and the Calder and Hebble Navigation.

=== Calder and Hebble Navigation ===
The Calder and Hebble navigation is another river navigation, which saw commercial coal traffic until 1981, when deliveries to Thornhill Power Station by water ceased. The first three locks, up to Broad Cut Low Lock, were enlarged as a result on co-operation with the Aire and Calder Navigation, and are 120 by 17.5 feet (36.6 by 5.3 m). Broad Cut Top Lock and those above it are still sized for Yorkshire Keels, and are only 57 by 14 feet (17.4 by 4.3 m). It is possible to negotiate the locks is a 60-foot (18 m) narrowboat, but the boat has to fit across the lock diagonally to do so. The locks also require a handspike to open the paddles.

Most of the navigation is in artificial cuts, with brief sections where it rejoins the river. At Dewsbury, the short Dewsbury Arm gives access to Saville Town Basin. Beyond the junction, the route is isolated from the town as it is in a deep cutting. At Battyeford, there is a large sewage treatment works, and the navigation turns to the left to pass under a railway bridge. This is followed by Cooper Bridge Lock and Cooper Bridge Flood Gates, after which is the junction with the Huddersfield Broad Canal. The route of the North Pennine Ring continues straight ahead along the Calder and Hebble; the Outer Pennine Ring makes a U-turn to the left to reach Huddersfield. The distance between Fall Ing lock and the junction is 13.1 miles (21.1 km), and the section contains 12 locks, five flood locks and two sets of flood gates.

=== Huddersfield Broad Canal ===
There are nine locks on the next relatively short section of just 3.3 miles (5.3 km) from the junction to Apsley Basin. The locks are again keel-sized, and the canal was completed in 1780. Apsley Basin developed once the Huddersfield Narrow Canal opened, as the narrow boats were too long to continue along the Broad Canal, and so goods had to be transhipped. A compromise was reached with the introduction of West Riding narrowboats, which were short enough to work through both systems. Near the basin is the oldest surviving warehouse in the country, dating from before 1778. Commercial traffic ceased in 1953, but the canal remained open, and has seen increased traffic since the re-opening of the Huddersfield Narrow Canal.

=== Huddersfield Narrow Canal ===
Construction of the Huddersfield Narrow Canal began in 1794, and parts of it were open by 1797, but it was not until 1811 that it was fully open, as a result of delays in building the longest canal tunnel in Britain at Standedge. Although only 19.9 miles (32.0 km) long, it includes 74 locks, 42 to the east of the tunnel and 32 to the west. The ascent from Huddersfield through Linthwaite and Slaithwaite to the tunnel mouth at Marsden is relentless, with over 5 locks per mile (3 locks per km). The route follows the Colne Valley, and is shadowed by a railway which runs just to the north of the canal. There is an interpretation centre near the tunnel mouth, and there are two unused single-track railway tunnels and a double-track railway tunnel as well as the canal tunnel. Passage through the tunnel has to be booked in advance, and is only available on certain days. The ends of the canal tunnel were adjusted with the construction of the railway tunnels, and it is currently 5,698 yards (5,210 m) long. The journey through it takes around three hours, and convoys of up to four boats can pass in each direction on days when the tunnel is operational.

To the west of the tunnel, the canal follows the valley of the River Tame, and is again shadowed by the railway. To the south of Mossley is Scout Tunnel, just 205 yards (187 m) long, and a little further on, the canal is straddled by an electricity pylon. The section through Stalybridge was culverted in 1947, but now threads its way through busy streets. Just below the first lock, the canal passes through the 166-yard (152 m) Asda Tunnel, to arrive at Dukinfield Junction and the Portland Basin, where it joins the Peak Forest Canal and the Ashton Canal. The reopening of the canal in 2001 provided the final link in the Outer Pennine Ring.

=== Ashton Canal ===
The Ashton Canal was opened shortly after 1792, and was unusual in the north-west, as it was built as a narrow canal, suitable for boats 72 by 7 feet (21.9 by 2.1 m), whereas most of the neighbouring canals were suitable for wide-beam boats. It was effectively unnavigable by 1962, but re-opening was spearheaded by the Peak Forest Canal Society and the Inland Waterways Association, and with assistance from British Waterways and local councils, it re-opened in 1974. The canal is 6.7 miles (10.8 km) long, has 18 locks, and passes through a dense urban landscape. Between locks 10 and 11 is a short spur which was once the start of the Stockport Branch Canal, which ran on the level for 5 miles (8.0 km) to Stockport. At Ducie Street Junction, the canal joins the Rochdale Canal.

=== Rochdale Canal ===
The final section of the Outer Pennine Ring follows the lower part of the Rochdale Canal. Although authorised in the same year as the Huddersfield Narrow Canal, it was completed in 1804, some 7 years earlier. The North Pennine Ring, which followed the Calder and Hebble Navigation above Cooper Bridge, continues along the main line of the Rochdale Canal above Ducie Street Junction and rejoins the Outer Pennine Ring at this point. Most of the canal was closed in 1952, but the final section remained open, to provide a link between the Bridgewater Canal and the Ashton Canal. There are nine locks on this 1.2-mile (1.9 km) stretch, which passes through urban Manchester, to arrive at Castlefield Junction on the Bridgewater Canal, completing the ring.

== See also ==
- Canals of the United Kingdom
- History of the British canal system
- North Pennine Ring

== Bibliography ==
- Cumberlidge, Jane (2009). Inland Waterways of Great Britain (8th Ed.). Imray Laurie Norie and Wilson. ISBN 978-1-84623-010-3.
- Nicholson (2006). Nicholson Waterways Guide (Vol 5): North West and the Pennines. Harper Collins. ISBN 978-0-00-721113-5.
- Shead, Jim (March 2004). "The Cheshire Ring". Waterways World. ISSN 0309-1422. Archived from the original on 3 March 2016.
