= Stanley Ferry Aqueduct =

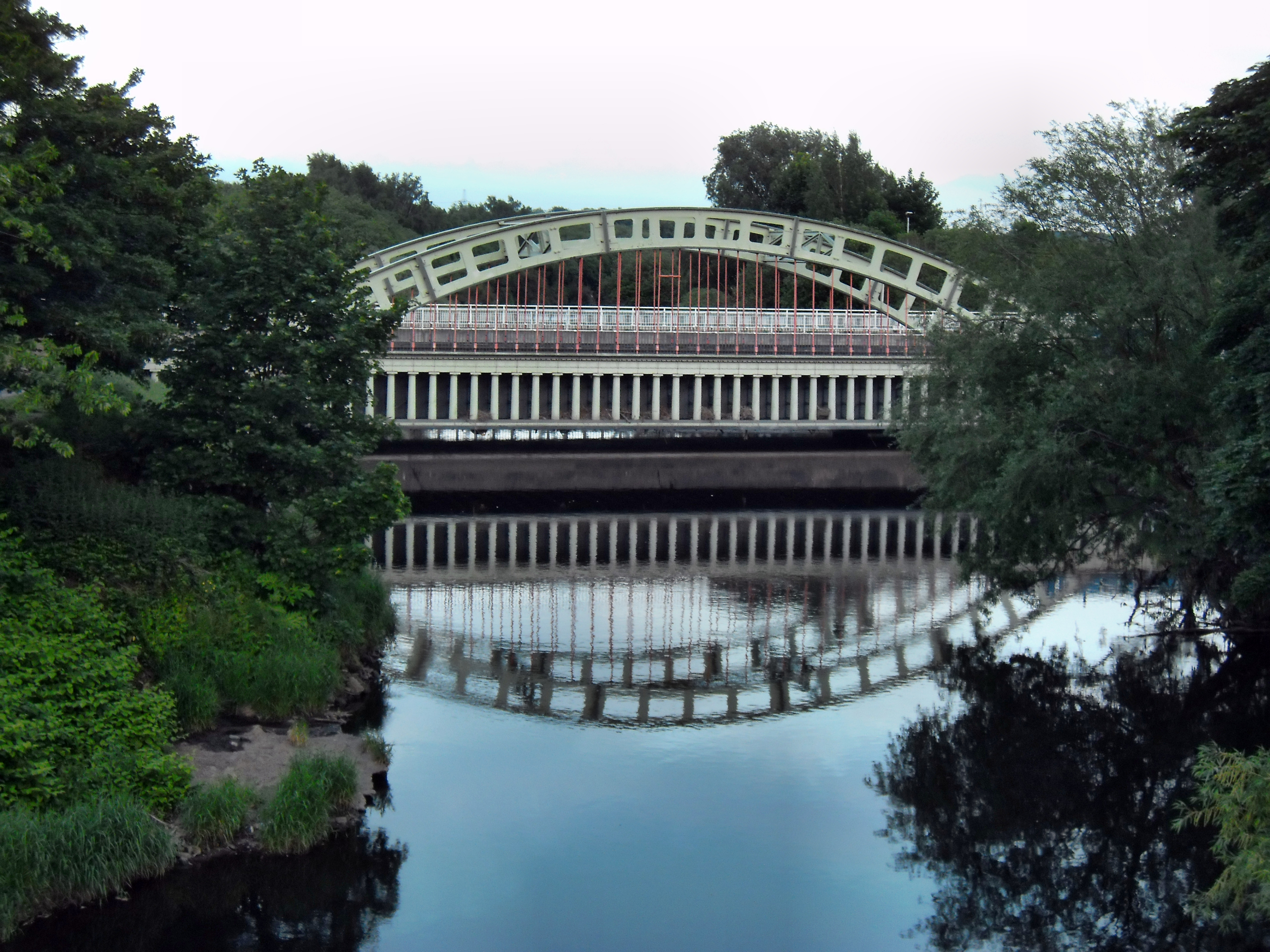
- Coordinates: 53.7024°N 1.4624°W
- OS grid reference: SE355230
- Carries: Aire and Calder Navigation
- Crosses: River Calder
- Locale: Stanley Ferry
- Maintained by: Canal & River Trust
- Heritage status: Grade I listed

Characteristics
- Trough construction: Cast iron
- Total length: 165 feet (50.3 m)
- Width: 24 feet (7.3 m)
- Towpaths: Both

History
- Designer: George Leather
- Construction start: 1836
- Construction end: 1839

Stanley Ferry Aqueduct was built between 1836 and 1839 to take the Aire and Calder Navigation over the River Calder in West Yorkshire, England. It is one of the earliest through arch bridges in the world and is considered to be the longest span aqueduct executed in cast iron.

Designed by George Leather Sr. and built by H. McIntosh, the aqueduct has a span of 165 feet (50 m), a width of 24 feet (7.3 m) and a depth of 8.5 feet (2.6 m). It is still in use today, though an additional wider concrete aqueduct was constructed alongside in 1981 and the bridge was then renovated. Stanley Ferry is also the place where the Tom Pudding tub boats were loaded with coal from local collieries between 1863 and 1985 and transported down to Goole in long trains by canal.

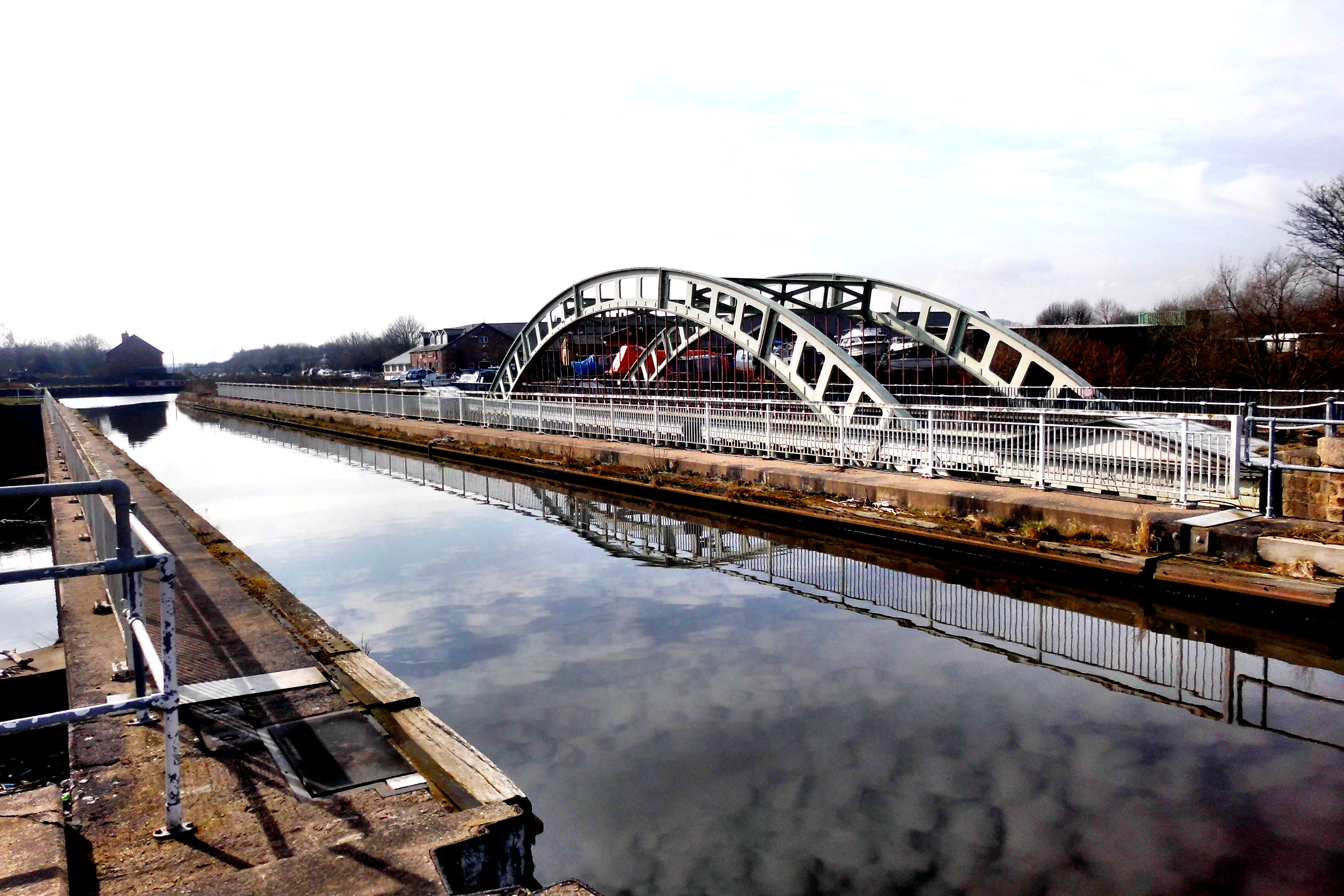
The arch bridge and its concrete neighbour from the canalside

The site is one of three historic fords crossing the River Calder near Wakefield. Because the water was deepened for navigation a ferry became necessary, but was replaced by the first bridge in 1879.

Like many through arch bridges, the design of the bridge is often confused with the tied-arch bridge; many bridges have both characteristics. However in this case the bridge is of cast iron, which would be weak in tension. Although the aqueduct channel is in the right position to act in tying the arch, it would have no strength in this direction. At Stanley Ferry, the outward sideways thrust of the arch is retained by its abutments, as for the simple arch bridge.

== See also ==
- List of canal aqueducts in the United Kingdom
- Grade I listed buildings in West Yorkshire
- Listed buildings in Normanton, West Yorkshire
