= Aire and Calder Navigation =

Canal in West Yorkshire, England

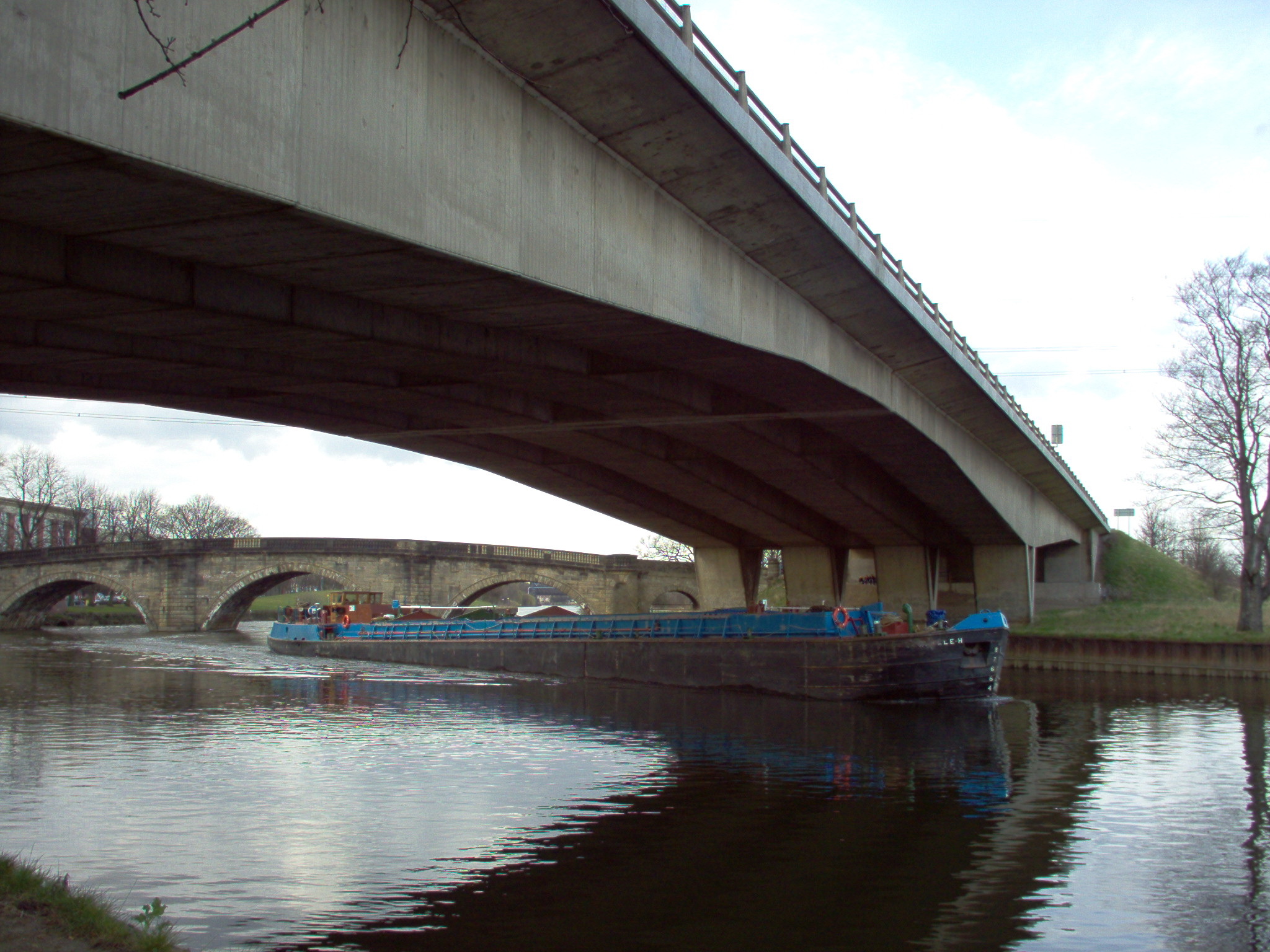
- One of the 600 tonne barges used on the Navigation
- Interactive map of Aire and Calder Navigation

Specifications
- Length: 34 miles (55 km)
- Maximum boat length: 200 ft 0 in (60.96 m) (originally 58 ft 0 in or 17.68 m)
- Maximum boat beam: 20 ft 0 in (6.10 m) (originally 14 ft 6 in or 4.42 m)
- Locks: 16
- Status: Open
- Navigation authority: Canal and River Trust

History
- Original owner: Aire and Calder Navigation Company
- Principal engineer: John Hadley
- Date of act: 1699
- Date of first use: 1704

Geography
- Start point: Leeds (Aire) and Wakefield (Calder)
- End point: Goole Docks

The Aire and Calder Navigation is the canalised section of the Rivers Aire and Calder in West Yorkshire, England. The first improvements to the rivers above Knottingley were completed in 1704 when the Aire was made navigable to Leeds and the Calder to Wakefield, by the construction of 16 locks. Lock sizes were increased several times, as was the depth of water, to enable larger boats to use the system. The Aire below Haddlesey was bypassed by the opening of the Selby Canal in 1778. A canal from Knottingley to the new docks and new town at Goole provided a much shorter route to the River Ouse from 1826. The New Junction Canal was constructed in 1905, to link the system to the River Don Navigation, by then part of the Sheffield and South Yorkshire Navigation.

Steam tugs were introduced in 1831. In the 1860s, compartment boats were introduced, later called Tom Puddings, from which coal was unloaded into ships by large hydraulic hoists. This system enabled the canal to carry at its peak more than 1.5 million tons of coal per year, and was not abandoned until 1986. To handle trains of compartments, many of the locks were lengthened to 450 feet (140 m).

Although much of the upper reaches are now designated as leisure routes, there is still significant commercial traffic on the navigation. 300,000 tons were carried in 2007, although most of the traffic is now petroleum and gravel, rather than the coal which kept the navigation profitable for 150 years.

== Route ==
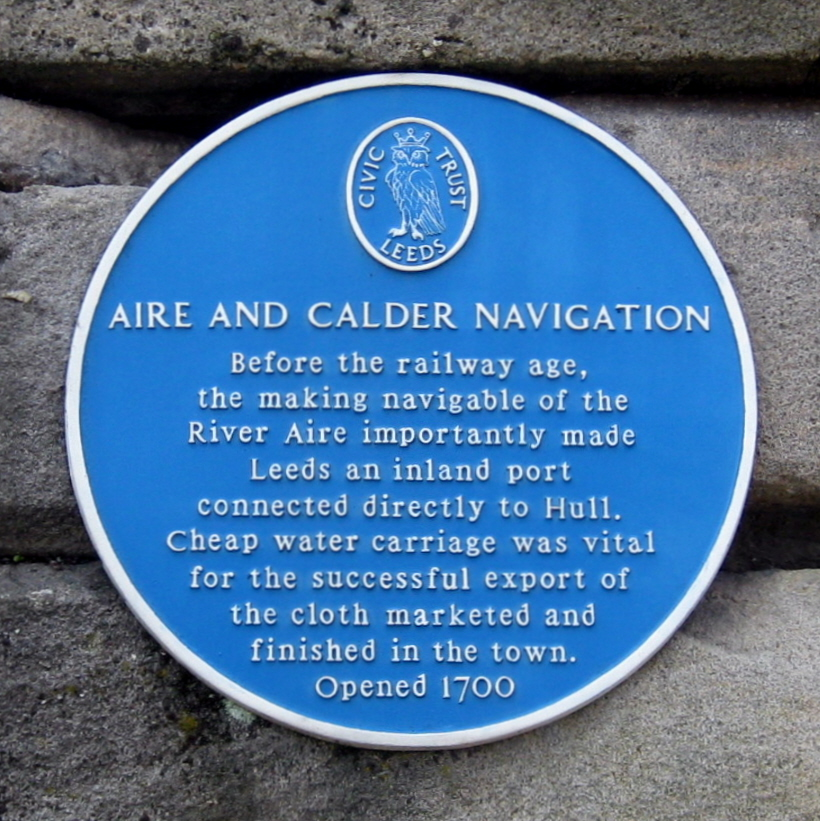
Aire and Calder Navigation blue plaque

The Aire and Calder is a canalisation of the River Calder from Wakefield to Castleford, where it joins the branch from Leeds, which follows the River Aire. The Aire continues to flow eastwards to Bank Dole Junction, then continues in a north-easterly direction to Haddlesey, from where it follows a winding course to join the River Ouse at Airmyn. The section below Haddlesey is no longer part of the navigation, as a derelict lock blocks access to the lower river. Instead, the Selby Canal flows northwards from Haddlesey to the Ouse at Selby. Below Dole Bank Junction, the Knottingley and Goole Canal flows eastwards to join the Ouse at Goole. From just before Newbridge, where the modern A614 road crosses the waterway, this branch of the navigation runs parallel to the Dutch River, an artificial channel built in 1635 to alleviate flooding caused by Cornelius Vermuyden's original diversion of the River Don northwards to the River Aire in 1628.

The Aire and Calder still fulfils its original purpose of linking Leeds and Wakefield with York and the Humber (and thence the Trent), although the routes by which this is achieved have changed significantly. More recent canals now also make the Navigation a vital link in the English and Welsh connected inland waterway network. Beyond Leeds, the Leeds and Liverpool Canal carries boats over the Pennines. The Calder and Hebble Navigation, which connects to the Navigation at Wakefield, allows boats to reach the Huddersfield Broad and Narrow Canals, and the Rochdale Canal. The Selby Canal connects to the Ouse, from where boats can travel upstream to reach York, Boroughbridge and Ripon, or downstream to the River Derwent. Beyond Goole are the Humber and hence Hull, Immingham, and the North Sea. The Sheffield and South Yorkshire Navigation, which can be reached via the New Junction Canal, forms a link with Doncaster, Rotherham and Sheffield to the south west, and the tidal River Trent at Keadby to the east.

== History ==
In the early 1600s, the River Aire was navigable to Knottingley, and boats carrying up to 30 tons traded on the river, which was tidal up to this point. The traders of Leeds were keen to have a navigable link to the town, to make easier the export of woollen cloth, but bills presented to Parliament in 1621 and 1625 had failed. William Pickering, who was mayor of Leeds, had made further attempts to obtain an act of Parliament for improvements to the river in 1679, again without success. As the 1600s drew to a close, a number of bills were passed for other rivers, and there was general support for river navigations. A bill was drawn up in 1698, with support from wool traders in Leeds and general merchants in Wakefield. John Hadley surveyed the Aire, and Samuel Shelton surveyed the Calder. Although the bill had a lot of support, it was opposed by the City of York, who feared that the River Ouse would be damaged by the scheme.

Aire and Calder Navigation Act 1698
- Act of Parliament
- Parliament of England
- Long title: An Act for the makeing and keeping navigable the Rivers of Aire and Calder in the County of Yorke.
- Citation: 10 Will. 3 c. 25 (Note: This is the citation in The Statutes of the Realm.); 10 & 11 Will. 3. c. 19 (Note: This is the citation in The Statutes at Large.)
- Territorial extent: England and Wales

Dates
- Royal assent: 4 May 1699
- Commencement: 6 December 1698 (Note: Start of session.)
Other legislation
Amended by	Aire and Calder Navigation Act 1774
Relates to	River Trent Navigation Act 1698

Status: Current legislation

Text of statute as originally enacted

The parliamentary bill was hotly contested, and the House of Lords asked Trinity House to produce a report on the three rivers. This favoured the scheme, and in May 1699 the Aire and Calder Navigation Act 1698 (10 Will. 3. c. 25) was granted. It named 18 undertakers, nine from the Corporation of Leeds, and nine "gentlemen of Wakefield", who would oversee the improvements to the River Aire (from the River Ouse at Airmyn via Castleford to Leeds) and the River Calder (from Castleford to Wakefield). The act gave them powers which included the creation of weirs bypassed by short "cuts" equipped with locks, the creation of a towpath, and the right to buy and demolish mills and weirs. John Hadley was engaged as the engineer immediately, and by 1704 the original work was completed, including 12 locks on the Aire between Haddesley and Leeds and 4 on the Calder. The locks were 58 to 60 feet (17.7 to 18.3 m) long by 14.5 to 15 feet (4.4 to 4.6 m) wide with 3.5 feet (1.1 m) depths over the sills.

Capital to fund the scheme had been raised separately by the Wakefield and Leeds committees. A complicated restructuring of the finances in 1721 fixed the nominal capital at £26,700. Regular dividends at 7 per cent were paid to the shareholders from 1718, and the navigation was leased to various groups, who would be responsible for collection of tolls and repairs. The lease rose from £800 in 1704 to £2,600 in 1729, when receipts from each of the previous five years had averaged £6,016. The early trade consisted mainly of woollen goods from Leeds, Wakefield, Halifax and Bradford, with wool and corn from Lincolnshire and East Anglia travelling in the opposite direction. By the 1720s there were also significant quantities of coal.

=== Development ===
Some development of the navigation occurred. In 1744, the undertakers bought some land at Airmyn, and developed warehousing and wharfage there, as a more convenient point than Rawcliffe, where the water was shallower. In the 1760s, £13,000 was spent on improvements and maintenance, with several weirs being rebuilt to improve the depth of water. There was a long-running dispute with Arthur Ingram, who owned Knottingley mill, which started in 1731, and was not finally resolved until 1776, when the company bought both of Ingram's mills. Despite this, the general profitability of the navigation led the undertakers to be complacent about its development. They asked John Smeaton to suggest improvements in 1771, but the subsequent attempt to authorise such improvements was disputed in Parliament on the basis that the present navigation was totally inadequate. The recently finished Calder and Hebble Navigation proposed to build a canal from Wakefield to the Dutch River, which would bypass the Calder completely, and the Leeds and Liverpool Canal supported a Leeds to Selby canal, which would bypass the Aire. During 1772, they asked Smeaton to survey a route to avoid the lower Aire, but his assistant, William Jessop actually carried out the work. He proposed a 7 1/4-mile (11.7 km) canal from Haddlesey lock to the Ouse at Newland. With Parliament not reaching a decision, they reworked their plan, which was now for a 5 1/4-mile (8.4 km) canal from Haddlesey to Selby, with a new cut from Ferrybridge to Beal, and improvements above Castleford. In 1774 the Leeds to Selby bill was rejected by Parliament, but the Aire and Calder bill was passed as the Aire and Calder Navigation Act 1774 (14 Geo. 3. c. 96) with a few amendments.

Construction of the Selby Canal began in 1775, and it was opened on 29 April 1778. The new cut at Castleford opened in spring 1775, while those at Knostrop and Hunslet were finished in 1779. Methley cut was completed, but Woodlesford was not, as the company bought the mill there instead. All locks were replaced, and the total cost was over £60,000, of which around £20,000 was for the Selby Canal. The navigation remained profitable, paying £9,000 in dividends in 1775, which had risen to £32,000 by 1791. Most traffic now used the Selby route, and the transhipment facilities at Airmyn were closed in 1779.

Selby was the upper limit for seagoing ships at the time, and became a major transhipment port for the smaller boats using the canal. Canal boats were limited to about 60 tons, whereas ships of up to 200 tons could reach Selby. By 1800, it was handling some 369,780 tons of goods, and the support industries of ropemaking, sailmaking and shipbuilding were expanding.

=== Knottingley to Goole ===
In 1817, there was a proposal for an Aire and Don Canal, to connect Knottingley to the Dutch River at Newbridge, with a branch to Doncaster, and another for a Went and Wakefield Canal, to connect Cold Hiendley on the Barnsley Canal to Newbridge on the Don. With revenue from tolls reaching £82,092 in 1818, which enabled a dividend of £54,000 to be paid, the company was in a healthy state, and proposed their own route from Haddlesey to the Dutch River. The destination was then changed to Goole, and John Rennie was asked to survey the route. Those opposing the scheme were placated by a clause which ensured the Aire to Airmyn and the Selby Canal would be maintained. In July 1821, Rennie proposed the construction of docks at Goole, rather than a lock into the river, and the company proposed that 7 feet (2.1 m) of water should be available. Rennie died in late 1821, and George Leather took over as engineer. Construction at Goole started on 28 September 1822, and the company eventually built much of the new town as well as the docks.

The canal and docks opened on 20 July 1826. A barge lock, 72.5 by 22 feet (22.1 by 6.7 m) and a ship lock, 120 by 33.7 feet (36.6 by 10.3 m), capable of taking vessels up to 400 tons, connected the extensive docks to the Ouse. The new section was 18.7 miles (30.1 km) long, with locks at Ferrybridge, Whitley, Pollington and Goole. The connection to the Aire and the Selby canal was maintained by the lock at Bank Dole. Goole became an official port in 1827, when it gained its own Customs facilities. The scheme had cost £361,484, of which £221,350 had been borrowed, while the rest came from company resources.

Aire and Calder Navigation Act 1828
- Act of Parliament
- Parliament of the United Kingdom
- Long title: An Act to enable the Undertakers of the Navigation of the Rivers Ayre and Calder, in the West Riding of the County of York, to make certain Cuts and Canals, and to improve the said Navigation.
- Citation: 9 Geo. 4. c. xcviii
- Territorial extent: United Kingdom

Dates
- Royal assent: 19 June 1828
- Commencement: 19 June 1828 (Note: The Acts of Parliament (Commencement) Act 1793.)
Other legislation
Amends	Aire and Calder Navigation Act 1820
Amended by	Wakefield, Pontefract and Goole Railway and Port of Goole Act 1846; North Eastern Railway (Hull and Doncaster Branch) Act 1863; Aire and Calder Navigation Act 1889; Aire and Calder Navigation Act 1929; Aire and Calder Navigation Act 1992
Relates to	York and North Midland Railway Act 1836; Manchester and Leeds Railway Act 1836; British Transport Commission Act 1962

Status: Amended

Text of statute as originally enacted

Faced with yet another outside scheme which would bypass the navigation from Wakefield to Ferrybridge, the company looked at improvements which would give 7 feet (2.1 m) of water all the way to both Leeds and Wakefield. Thomas Telford surveyed both routes, and it became the basis for an act of Parliament, the Aire and Calder Navigation Act 1828 (9 Geo. 4. c. xcviii), which was passed in June 1828. It included a clause to ensure that the Selby Canal was maintained with a depth of water of 5 feet (1.5 m), and made provision for extensions to Goole docks. Work started on a new cut at Castleford and on the line to Leeds, but legal action over the Selby Canal meant that it had to be made deeper and wider in 1832 and 1833. The Leeds line was completed in April 1835, somewhat later than anticipated, as the banks were made more substantial, to cope with steam tugs, which would be introduced in due course. The seven locks above Castelford were all 18 feet (5.5 m) wide. Improvements to the Calder to Wakefield took longer, as there were problems with floods filling the workings, difficulty with constructing foundations for an aqueduct which would carry the navigation over the River Calder at Stanley Ferry, and then in transporting the castings for the aqueduct to the site. The cost of the improvements ran to around £510,000.

=== Modernisation ===
The Aire and Calder tried to work with the railways when they arrived in the 1840s, by making traffic agreements, but still suffered a significant drop in trade. Receipts dropped by one-third between 1851 and 1856. Thomas Hammond Bartholomew, the chief engineer, had been experimenting with steam power since 1813, and steam paddle tugs had been operating on the system since 1831. When he died in late 1852, two-thirds of the traffic was pulled by steam tugs. His son, William Hammond Bartholomew, replaced him and introduced tugs with propellers soon afterwards. These could tow ten keels, carrying 700 tons, but were held up at locks, as the keels had to be worked through one at a time. Between 1860 and 1867, the locks from Goole to Castleford were extended to 206 by 22 feet (62.8 by 6.7 m) to alleviate this.

In 1861, Bartholomew met with the chairman, Warde-Aldam, to propose a system of sectional boats, each consisting of six compartments, with a bow and stern section. The compartments or tubs would be unloaded into ships by a hydraulic hoist at Goole, which would lift them from the water and tip them over. Warde-Aldam thought that such a system could carry 45,000 tons of coal per year, and £13,382 was allocated for three train boats, a hoist, and hydraulic machinery to control the hoist and the lock into the docks. By late 1864, the prototypes were operational, with the stern section replaced by a pusher tug. Soon afterwards, extra compartments were ordered, as experience showed that a tug and seven compartments could fit into the larger locks. In 1874, Warde-Aldam noted that "...the people now call them 'Tom Puddings' from their wobbling gait." The length of the trains increased to ten or eleven tubs, but such a train was difficult to steer from the rear, and so the tugs moved to the front and pulled the assembly. In 1880 they carried 151,860 tons, and by 1913 there were 18 tugs, 1,010 compartments, and 1,560,006 tons were carried, 33 times Warde-Aldam's original estimate.

Around 1864, the Aire and Calder dabbled in owning its own railways, purchasing the Silkstone Waggonway from the Barnsley Canal. But this proved a poor investment; in 1866 the waggonway carried just 3,246 tons of coal down from a peak of over 32,000 in 1851, and in 1870 no coal was carried at all. In August 1872, it was reported that "the rails have been pulled up and sold".

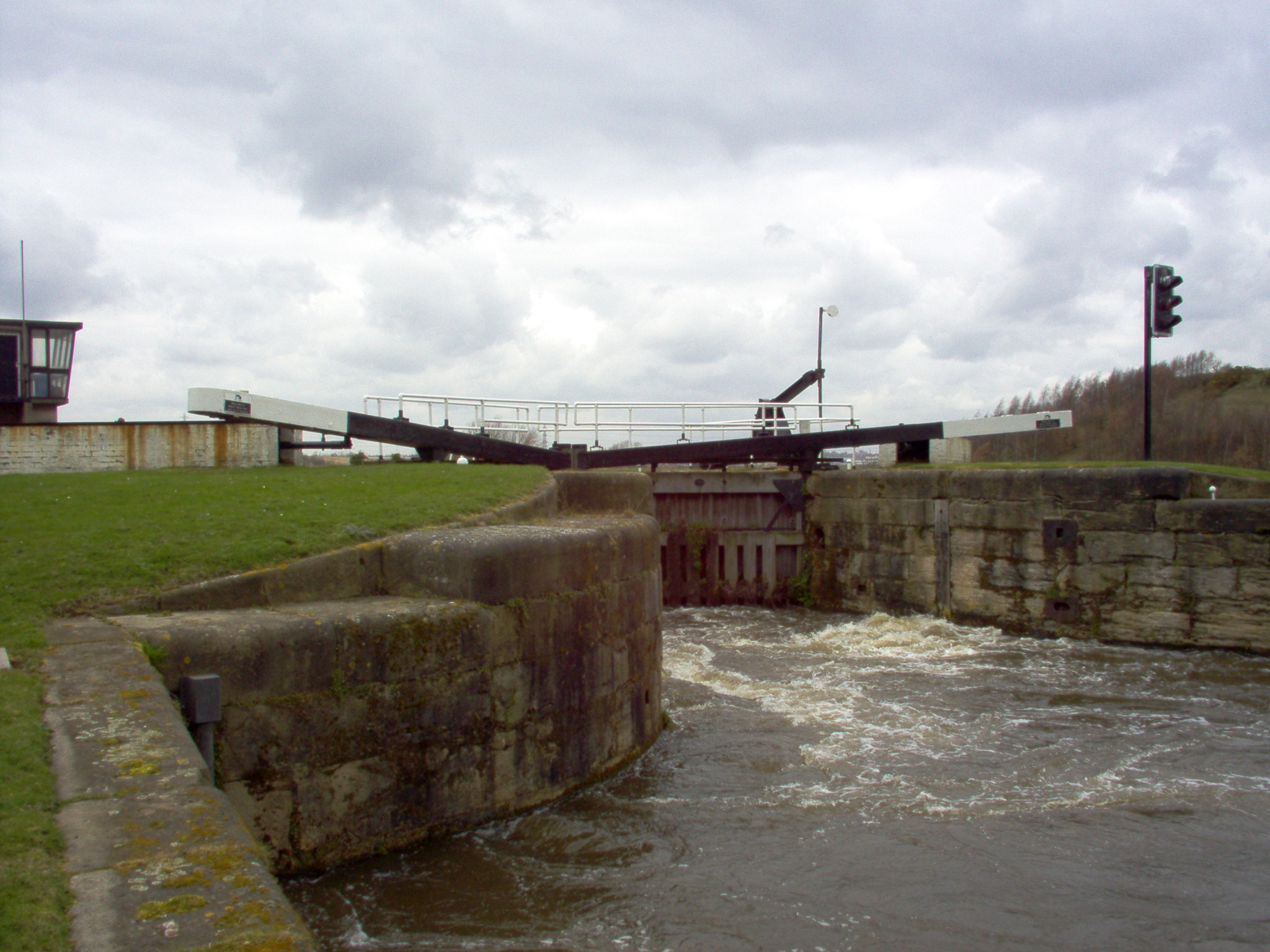
One of the large locks

After the First World War, another programme of improvements to the locks was carried out, extending the locks to 457 feet (139 m), which enabled trains of 19 compartments to operate regularly. Experiments with trains as long as 38 tubs were carried out, but the difficulty of splitting the train to pass through the locks meant that 19 was the usual maximum. The compartments continued until the late 1960s to carry around half a million tons of coal, long after most British canals had ceased to be used for commercial traffic, but the gradual demise of the coal industry led to compartment traffic ceasing in 1986.

The 20th century saw two major phases of improvement. In 1905, the New Junction Canal connected the Aire and Calder to the Sheffield and South Yorkshire Navigation near Stainforth. It was funded by the Aire and Calder, with the Don Navigation eventually meeting half the cost. During the 1960s, the navigation underwent another modernisation scheme, in which the locks from Goole to Leeds were upgraded and enlarged to accommodate vessels conforming to the 600-tonne Euro-barge standard. There is some variation in lock sizes, with the smallest being at Knostrop, which is 203 by 22 feet (61.9 by 6.7 m) with a water depth of 8.4 feet (2.6 m) over the lock cill. Euro barges are 200 by 20 feet (61.0 by 6.1 m), and when fully loaded with 600 tonnes of cargo, have a draught of 8.2 feet (2.5 m). Locks on the Wakefield section can accommodate vessels which are 195 by 17.6 feet (59.4 by 5.4 m) with a draught of 7.5 feet (2.3 m), though rigid vessels are constrained to 141 ft to enable turning at Wakefield while the locks below Castleford have three sets of gates, so that a 200-foot (61 m) section can be used, rather than the full 457 feet (139 m) required by the compartment boats.

The main problem with upgrading the Wakefield branch was the dimensions of George Leather's cast iron aqueduct over the River Calder at Stanley Ferry. Structural analysis showed that parts of the ironwork were overloaded, and so in 1981 a new concrete aqueduct was cast by John Laing Construction Ltd, on a site a little further upstream. The complete structure was then pushed into position by hydraulic jacks in a six-day operation, after which the navigation was diverted over it, although the old aqueduct was left in place and can still be used.

Aire and Calder Navigation Act 1992
- Act of Parliament
- Parliament of the United Kingdom
- Long title: An Act to provide for restoration and diversion of a section of the river Aire and of the Aire and Calder Navigation within the St. Aidan's Remainder Opencast Site of the British Coal Corporation; to authorise the Corporation to construct works and to acquire lands; to confer further powers on the Corporation; and for other purposes.
- Citation: 1992 c. iv

Dates
- Royal assent: 16 March 1992

Text of statute as originally enacted

Although coal mining was one of the main reasons for the success of the navigation, it has also brought problems, caused by subsidence. In March 1988, the bank near Lemonroyd lock collapsed into St Aidan's opencast mine, which then flooded. A significant factor was the presence of excavations below the opencast workings where lower coal seams had previously been mined. The failure resulted in some 780,000 cubic yards (600,000 m^{3}) of material, including the banks of the river and the canal, slipping into the workings, which then flooded to a depth of 230 feet (70 m), creating a lake which covered 250 acres (100 ha). The Aire and Calder Navigation Act 1992 (c. iv) was obtained to allow 1.9 miles (3.1 km) of new waterway to be constructed. The original locks at Kippax and Lemonroyd were replaced by a single lock at Lemonroyd. Opencast mining finally resumed ten years later, after the site had been pumped out, but the coal reserves are now exhausted, and the site forms a nature reserve, with wet grasslands, reedbeds and open water covering 740 acres (300 ha).

== Traffic ==
A 20th-century modification of the compartment boat system was used to feed the coal-fired Ferrybridge "C" power station. Starting in 1967, Cawoods Hargreaves used trains of three tubs or coal pans, which were rigidly connected, and pushed by a tug when loaded. The trains were filled with coal using canalside chutes at the colliery and pushed to the power station, where a hoist lifted each pan from the canal and upturned it to drop its contents onto a conveyor belt. Nine tugs and 35 pans were employed, with each pan holding around 170 tonnes. By the time the final load left Astley colliery in December 2002, 43 million tonnes had been delivered to Ferrybridge in this way. Experiments were made with trains of four pans, which allowed copper pipes to be carried on top of the coal for delivery to Goole, but this was short-lived. Coal carrying came to an abrupt halt in 2003 when the St Aidan's opencast mine was exhausted and the coal from Kellingley colliery was found to have levels of sulphur content high above the acceptable limit. During 2008, three of the trains were used on the River Don, to transport 250,000 tonnes of limestone from a quarry at Cadeby to Hexthorpe.

British Waterways introduced a similar system in September 1974. Called BACAT, for Barges Aboard Catamaran, the system consisted of trains of barges, which were pushed by a tug, and which would be loaded between the twin hulls of a custom-built delivery ship. The ship would then transport them across the North Sea to continental waterways, without their contents having to be transshipped. The concept failed after 18 months, as the dock workers at Hull blacklisted the entire British Waterways fleet, because they believed that the system would threaten their jobs. Most of the commercial traffic using the navigation now consists of petroleum tankers and gravel barges.

== Leisure boating ==
The Aire and Calder was built for commercial freight, and although the volume carried has dropped significantly, particularly since coal deliveries to Ferrybridge power station by canal stopped, the navigation still carried 300,000 tonnes of freight in 2007, down from 1.64 million tonnes in 2000. The Leeds to Castleford section and much of the Wakefield branch are now mainly used as leisure routes, but below Castleford, the industrial nature of the waterway is more obvious, and pleasure boats must give way to commercial vessels. 600 tonne vessels, designed to make maximum use of the locks, produce considerable wash, and are not as manoeuvrable as a narrow boat.

Much of the ex-industrial (western) part of the Navigation now has the appearance of a tree-lined, gently-twisting river. The eastern part of the Navigation, sometimes known as the Knottingley and Goole Canal, is rather different: it has long straight stretches, but mainly through flat land that has always been agricultural. Between Wakefield and Leeds, via Castleford, the Navigation is part of a circular cruising route or "ring", formed by the Leeds & Liverpool and the Huddersfield or Rochdale canals. The Outer Pennine Ring utilises the Huddersfield Canal, while the North Pennine Ring uses the Rochdale Canal for the southern crossing of the Pennines. Beyond Castleford, boaters can travel on to Selby, York, Goole, Sheffield, and Keadby. With the possible restoration of the Barnsley Canal and the Dearne and Dove Canal, the section between Wakefield and the New Junction Canal might become part of a new "Yorkshire Ring".

== Incidents ==
On 10 May 2021, an articulated lorry crashed off a bridge from the M62 and into the navigation. The tractor unit landed on the bank and the driver suffered minor injuries, while the trailer floated away.

== Points of interest ==
Point	Coordinates (Links to map resources)	OS Grid Ref	Notes
Crown Point Bridge	53.7938°N 1.5349°W	SE307331	Jn with Leeds and Liverpool Canal
Woodlesford Lock	53.7603°N 1.4448°W	SE367294	On the Leeds Branch
Fall Ings Lock	53.6737°N 1.4823°W	SE343198	Jn with Calder and Hebble Navigation
Site of Barnsley Canal Junction	53.6752°N 1.4725°W	SE349199	
Stanley Ferry Aqueducts	53.7025°N 1.4624°W	SE355230	over River Calder
Woodknock Lock	53.7213°N 1.4075°W	SE391251	plus derelict Fairies Hill Locks
Castleford Junction	53.7316°N 1.3585°W	SE424263	Leeds and Wakefield Branches join
Bank Dole Junction	53.7094°N 1.2311°W	SE508239	R Aire and Knottingley-Goole section
Haddlesey Flood Lock	53.7310°N 1.1368°W	SE570264	Jn of River Aire and Selby section
Selby Lock	53.7823°N 1.0574°W	SE622321	Jn with River Ouse Navigation
Whitley Lock	53.6922°N 1.1435°W	SE566220	on Knottingley-Goole section
Southfield Junction	53.6609°N 1.0159°W	SE651187	with New Junction Canal
Ocean Lock, Goole	53.6988°N 0.8671°W	SE748230	Jn with River Ouse

== Bibliography ==
- Andrews, F. A. (14 August 2000). "Freight by Inland Waterway". House of Commons, Environment, Transport and Regional Affairs. Archived from the original on 10 June 2015.
- Black; Veatch (2010). "Lower Aire Flood Risk Strategy" (PDF). Environment Agency. Archived from the original (PDF) on 14 March 2012.
- "New lease of life for Hargreaves coal barges" (PDF). CBOA Newsletter (3). Commercial Boat Operators Association. August 2008. Archived from the original (PDF) on 23 July 2011.
- Clarke, Mike (1999). The Aire and Calder Navigation. Tempus Publishing Ltd. ISBN 0-7524-1715-0.
- Crabtree, Harold (1993). Clarke, Mike (ed.). Railway on the Water. The Sobriety Project. ISBN 0-9522592-0-6.
- Cumberlidge, Jane (2009). Inland Waterways of Great Britain (8th Ed). Imray Laurie Norie and Wilson. ISBN 978-1-84623-010-3.
- Edwards, Lewis A. (1985). Inland Waterways of Great Britain (6th Ed). Imray Laurie Norie and Wilson. ISBN 0-85288-081-2.
- Freight Study Group (June 2002). "Freight on Water - A New Perspective" (PDF). Department for Environment, Food and Rural Affairs. Archived from the original (PDF) on 18 March 2011.
- Goodchild, J. (1994). "The Silkstone Railway". In Elliot, B. (ed.). Aspects of Barnsley 2. Barnsley: Wharncliffe.
- Hadfield, Charles (1972). The Canals of Yorkshire and North East England (Vol 1). David and Charles. ISBN 0-7153-5719-0.
- Hadfield, Charles (1973). The Canals of Yorkshire and North East England (Vol 2). David and Charles. ISBN 0-7153-5975-4.
- Hughes, D. B.; Clarke, B. G. (2001). "The River Aire Slope Failure". Canadian Geotechnical Journal. 38 (2). doi:10.1139/t00-091.
- ICE Briefing (January 2008). "Whitley Lock Stoppage". Institute of Civil Engineers. Archived from the original on 26 September 2011.
- Perrott, David; Mosse, Jonathan; Mosse, Jane (2006). Nicholson Waterways Guide (Volume 5). Harper Collins Publishers. ISBN 978-0-00-721113-5.
- Mosse, Jonathan (2006). Nicholson Waterways Guide (Volume 6). Harper Collins Publishers. ISBN 978-0-00-721114-2.
- Nicholson map (2006). Inland Waterways map of Great Britain. Harper Collins Publishers. ISBN 978-0-00-721117-3.
- Shead, Jim (February 2007). "Cruising Choices". Canals & Rivers. Archived from the original on 27 July 2013.
- Skempton, Sir Alec; et al. (2002). A Biographical Dictionary of Civil Engineers in Great Britain and Ireland: Vol 1: 1500 to 1830. Thomas Telford. ISBN 0-7277-2939-X.
- Taylor, Mike (2003). The Canal and River Sections of the Aire and Calder Navigation. Wharncliffe Books. ISBN 1-903425-37-9.
