= Tom Pudding =

Name given to the tub boats

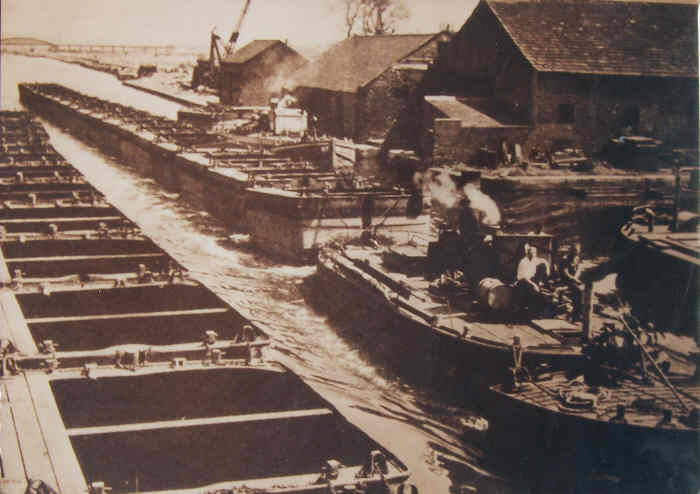
Tom Puddings at Castleford Gauging Station

Tom Pudding was the name given to the tub boats on the Aire and Calder Navigation, introduced in 1863 and used until 1985, which were a very efficient means of transferring and transporting coal from the open cast collieries of the South Yorkshire Coalfield near Stanley Ferry to the Port of Goole, competing with rail. The name derives from their resemblance to a string of black puddings or perhaps Yorkshire puddings and the first name of the original constructor.

== Background ==
The use of trains of boats to move bulk products has a long history. In the 1760s, the last Duke of Bridgewater developed the Navigable Levels at Worsley, a series of underground navigable tunnels serving coal workings. They were linked to the Bridgewater Canal, and two sizes of boats were used both underground and on the canal. 'M' boats were 53 by 6 feet (16.2 by 1.8 m) and carried 10 tons of coal, while 'T' boats were 50 by 4.5 feet (15.2 by 1.4 m) and carried 7 tons. They were pointed at both ends, as they could not be turned below ground, and were made up into trains of six to ten for transfer along the canal to Manchester. More similar to Bartholomew's eventual design were the tub boats used on the Shropshire Tub Boat Canals, which were rectangular and 20 by 6.3 feet (6.1 by 1.9 m). Tubs on the Ketley Canal carried 8 tons, but those on the Shropshire Canal were not as deep, and carried 5 tons. The locks on the Shrewsbury Canal were designed so that four tubs could fit into them. Although Thomas Telford, the engineer for the canal, stated that the locks had intermediate gates so that one, three or four tubs could use them, there is no evidence that the middle gates were ever fitted.

The Aire and Calder Canal Company opened the broad canal from Knottingley to Goole which was designed to circumvent the difficult lower reaches of the River Aire in 1826. They had been experimenting with steam-powered boats since 1813, and had introduced steam paddle tugs in 1831. Thomas Hamond Bartholomew, the canal company's engineer, was also experimenting with a steam-powered fly boat in 1852, but died later that year. The post of chief engineer was then given to his son, William Hamond Bartholomew, who continued to innovate. He introduced two types of tugs, both of which used propellers, rather than paddles, and the larger type was able to tow ten keels, carrying a total of 700 tons of cargo. Problems were experienced at locks, where the keels had to be worked through individually, and so in 1859, Bartholomew decided to lengthen the locks so that the trains of boats could pass through more easily. Pollington lock was lengthened to 206 feet (63 m) in October 1860, and Whitley, Bulholme, Ferrybridge and Castleford locks followed. The stage was now set for Bartholomew's next major innovation.

== Development ==
On 20 May 1861, Bartholomew met with Mr. Wilson and Mr. Warde-Aldam, the company chairman, and they discussed the possibility of using iron compartments, which would be filled with coal, and emptied by a hoist at Goole. Bartholomew thought that a compartment holding 30 tons would be ideal, although Warde-Aldam recommended 25 tons. The plan was to use six compartments, sandwiched between a bow and a stern compartment, which would be towed like a conventional boat. The hoist would be hydraulic, and they were already considering the introduction of hydraulic power at Goole to operate the locks. On 20 December 1861, a board meeting authorised the expenditure of £13,382, which would include three 'train boats' costing £1,100 each, a hoist at £2,500, and the hydraulic equipment to operate both the lock and the hoist.

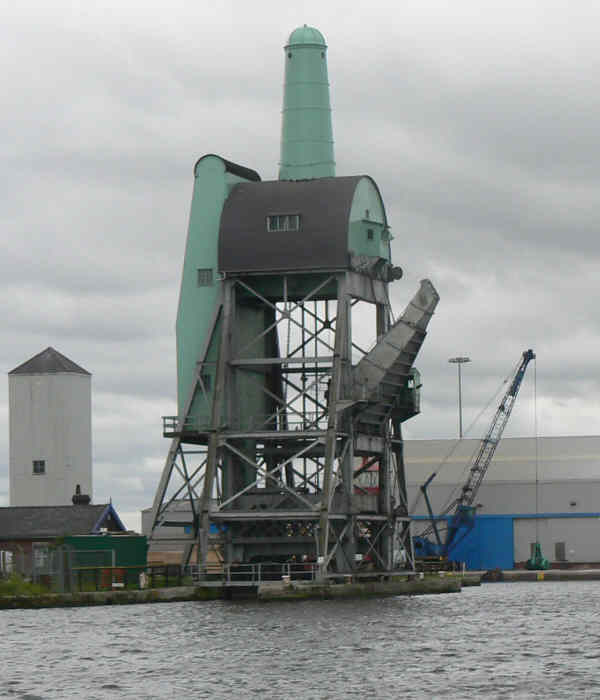
Tom Pudding hoist at Goole

By the time Bartholomew had obtained a patent on 7 February 1862, the plans had developed somewhat, as the design now included a steam-powered pusher tug instead of the stern compartment, and included chains which ran the length of the train to enable it to be steered. He had no idea how the boat would behave when afloat, and so the detailed design work was given to Hudswell and Clarke of Leeds, while the design of the hoist was the responsibility of William Armstrong and Co. Ltd. The original plan was to use doors in the side of the compartment to unload the coal, which would require it to be hoisted some 35 feet (11 m) upwards to allow the coal to discharge into a coaster. Although Hudswell and Clarke may have built one compartment with side doors, and several designs were contemplated, the engineer at Armstrong's suggested that a better solution would be to raise the compartments in a cage, which could then be tipped right over, so that the coal was emptied out of the top of the boat. This they thought would only require the compartment to be raised by 25 feet (7.6 m), and so the hoist would be cheaper to build. By September 1863, the Aire and Calder had taken delivery of six compartments and a stern tug, but the bow section was missing, and construction of the hoist had not begun. Warde-Aldam expressed some concern, as the handling of such a boat was still unknown.

Warde-Aldam's fears were unfounded, as by the end of the year trials with the complete boat were sufficiently successful that an order was placed for more units. Each tug and bow section would have three sets of six compartments, so that one could be loading, one unloading, and the third could be in transit. Steering of the boat was controlled by the chains running down both sides of the assembly, which were connected to two steam-operated pistons on the tug. In order to keep the compartments in line, each had a projecting stem post, which fitted into a recess in the back of the next compartment. The hoist was eventually tested on 4 February 1864, and full trials began in August of that year. Operation of the hoist was deficient, and the two small hydraulic cylinders which powered it were replaced by one much larger one. Subsequent hoists had two large cylinders, and the hydraulic pressure was increased from 750 pounds per square inch (52 bar) to 825 pounds per square inch (56.9 bar) and finally 900 pounds per square inch (62 bar). Having handled 1,198 tons of coal during the trials, the system was operational by the beginning of 1865.

== Operation ==
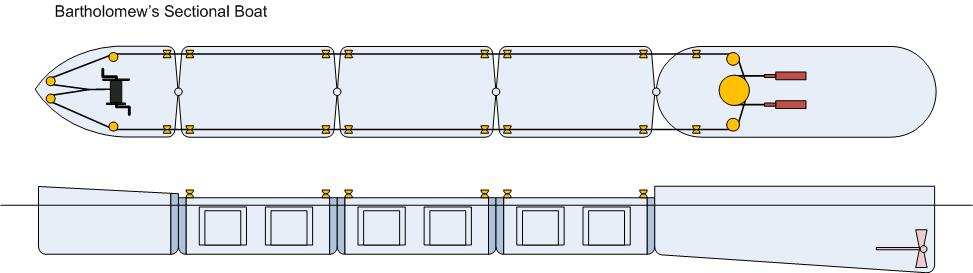
Diagram of Bartholomew's sectional boat, based on 1862 patent and revised steering mechanism of 1866

Although the design was for six compartments per train, it was found that seven could fit through the locks, and so the trains were lengthened. The compartments were made deeper after the first 19 had been built, so that they could carry 30 tons each, rather than 25. The new design was found to be more stable, and a train now held 210 tons of coal. It took between eight and twelve hours to travel from the colliery at Stanley Ferry to Goole, a distance of around 30 miles (48 km), and three and a half hours to unload the compartments, but the trains were often delayed at Goole for two or three days before they could be unloaded, and at the colliery, trains could be delayed for up to 13 days before they were loaded. In order to operate a train, a crew of four men were needed, consisting of a captain, a mate, an engineer and a stoker.

Experience proved that a train of seven compartments was the longest that could be controlled. While it was possible to push ten or eleven compartments, they became difficult to steer when empty, and particularly if it was windy. In the 1870s, the number of compartments was increased to four trains of seven per tug, but as the numbers available increased, the concept of a fixed train gave way to the compartments being considered individually, and a train could be made up from any that were available. The tugs had a water tank near the bow, which could be filled or emptied to alter the angle of the tug depending on whether it was pushing a train of full or empty compartments. When Bartholomew presented evidence to the Select Committee On Canals in 1883, he indicated that trains often exceeded 11 compartments, and that in this configuration, the tug pulled the compartments. At the time, many trains consisted of 11 or 12 compartments, but trains of 22 were quite frequent, and up to 30 had been tried. Spring buffers had been added between the compartments, to assist the straightening of the boat after it had negotiated a bend in the canal. The navigation company hoped to extend the locks by another 250 feet (76 m) to allow the longer trains to pass without having to split them, but there is no evidence that this programme was carried out, as the normal length of a train was still 10 or 11 compartments in 1904.

When the system had been operating for six years, Bartholomew approached the directors, and pointed out that although such a system had not been tried before, it had been completely successful, and he had not wasted any money on abortive alterations. All changes had been made as a result of actual experience. The directors recognised his competence, and awarded him a bonus of £1,000, and a payment of £220 for the models which he had made. As a result, he allowed the canal company to freely use his patent. Bartholomew went on to become General Manager of the Canal Company as well as Chief Engineer from 1875.

After the first world war, the length of the locks between Goole and Castleford was increased to over 450 feet (140 m), which allowed trains of 19 compartments with a leader and tug to work through them without being split. A leader, known as a "Jebus", was still used as the pointed bow ensured that the water from the tug's propeller was directed downwards and under the train, rather than hitting the vertical end of the first compartment. Above Castleford, such trains had to be split. Experiments were also made with much longer trains below Castleford, and as many as 38 compartments were coupled together.

== Mechanisation ==
The key to the success of the system was the mechanisation of the transshipments. In the docks at Goole, the large boat hoists could lift the Puddings and discharge them directly into seagoing ships which exported the coal to all parts of the world. One of the five hoists has been preserved.

At the colliery the containers were mounted on waggons so that they could be taken into the heart of the colliery and the coal loaded directly from the pit head. In 1891, an inclined plane was installed at Stanley Ferry to connect the colliery directly to the canal. The 15-foot (4.6 m) wide compartments carrying 35 tons of coal were balanced on standard gauge railway wagons. Despite the precarious nature of this operation, no accidents were recorded. Because of the success of the system, by 1913 there were over 1,000 Tom Puddings in use and they were transporting 1,500,000 long tons (1,700,000 short tons; 1,500,000 t) of coal per year, which compares well with Warde-Aldam's original estimate of 45,000 tons per year.

A similar system was developed when the Kellingley Colliery opened at Knottingley. The Hargreave barge system was used to transport coal to the power station at Ferrybridge. The configuration consisted of three coal pans, each 56 by 9.25 feet (17.07 by 2.82 m) and 9.5 feet (2.9 m) deep, capable of carrying 170 long tons (190 short tons; 170 t) of coal. With a pusher tug at the rear, the train was 195 feet (59 m) long. The pans were, however, rigidly connected to each other, unlike Bartholomew's flexible arrangement.
