= Shuffleton Mill =

Windmill in Goole, East Riding of Yorkshire, England

Coordinates: 53°42′16″N 0°51′52″W

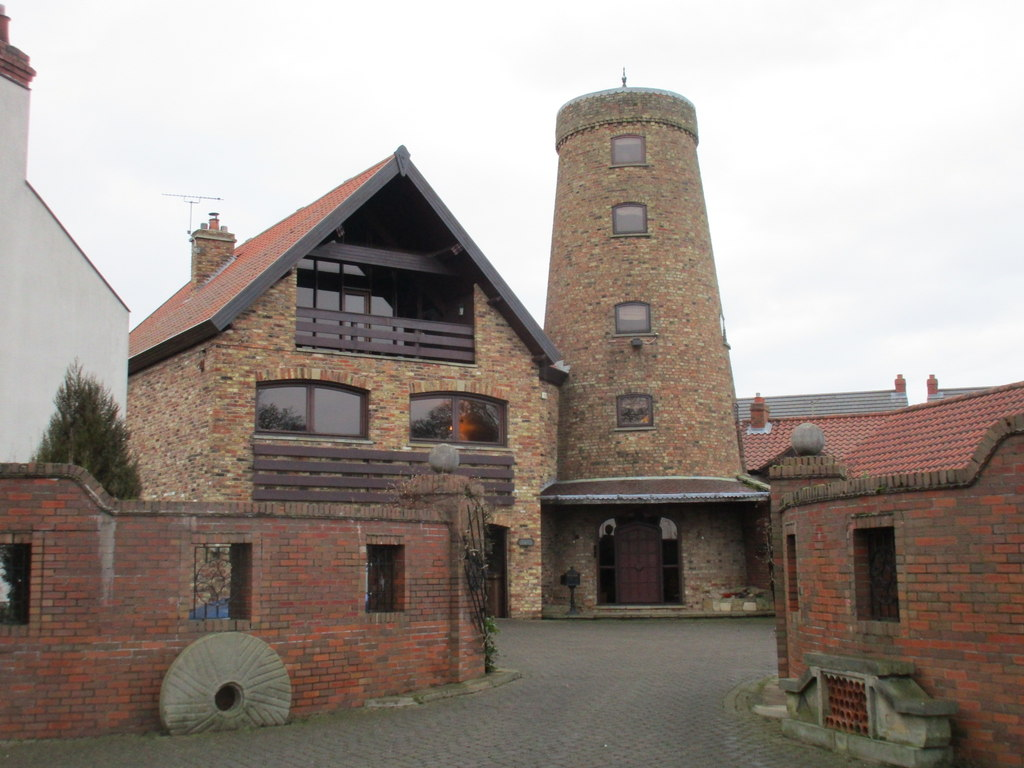
The building, in 2017

Shuffleton Mill is a historic building in Goole, a town in the East Riding of Yorkshire, in England.

The windmill was built around 1800, near Hook Road. Michael Watson claims that it was the first windmill to be built in Goole, before Timm's Mill, and was probably constructed by William Calvert, a local farmer. It was used to produce flour by a variety of tenants until 1870, when it was purchased by George Heron. In 1893, he removed the sails, and the mill was thereafter operated by steam. It closed in 1972, when the owners sold the business to the owners of Timm's Mill. It fell into ruin, but was later restored and converted into a house. The building has been grade II listed since 1987.

The windmill is built of tarred yellow-orange brick, and consists of a tapering five-storey round tower with a dentilled and cogged cornice. The tower contains doorways and windows, all the original ones under segmental header arches.

== See also ==
- Listed buildings in Goole
