= Shirley Teed =

British artist (1933-2018)

- Born: 1933; Bristol, England
- Died: 2018 (aged 84–85); Cornwall, England
- Known for: Painting
- Partner: Peter Teed (m.1955-2018, her death)

Shirley Brenda Teed (1933-2018) was a British artist. In her seven decade career Teed often depicted groups of people gathered together in social occasions and also landscapes and geological formations.

== Biography ==
Teed was born in Bristol and attended Badminton School before studying at the West of England College of Art from 1949 to 1954. After graduation she spent a year teaching at St Brandon's School in Somerset and then spent three years in Australia following her marriage to Peter Teed. In Australia she had an exhibition in Melbourne and also met the curator John Brock, who was a great influence on her art. In 1959 Teed returned to England and lived initially in Surrey before settling in Goole in 1964, when her husband took a post at Goole Grammar School. Eventually he was appointed headmaster of the school, a position he held for some twenty-one years.

Shirley Teed continued to paint and exhibit while raising four children and playing an active role in the local Goole community. She was a school governor, acted as both a costume designer for many Goole Grammar School theatre productions and as an artistic mentor to both students and school staff. She regularly had paintings shown at the Royal Academy summer exhibitions in London, with the Royal Society of British Artists and with the Royal Cambrian Academy. She had solo shows at the Usher Gallery in Lincoln in 1975 and 1983, at the University of Exeter in 1978, at Falmouth Art Gallery in 1981, at the Leeds Playhouse in 1984 and at the Patricia Wells Gallery in Thornbury near Bristol. For many years Riverside, a large five panel painting by Teed of local people shown against a background of Goole's port, was displayed in a community centre in the town.

Shirley and Peter Teed eventually retired to Crantock in Cornwall where they both died in 2018, within ten days of each other. A large retrospective of Shirley Teed's paintings was held in York later that year.
