= Theatre Royal, Goole =

Building in Goole, East Riding of Yorkshire, England

Coordinates: 53°42′05″N 0°52′09″W

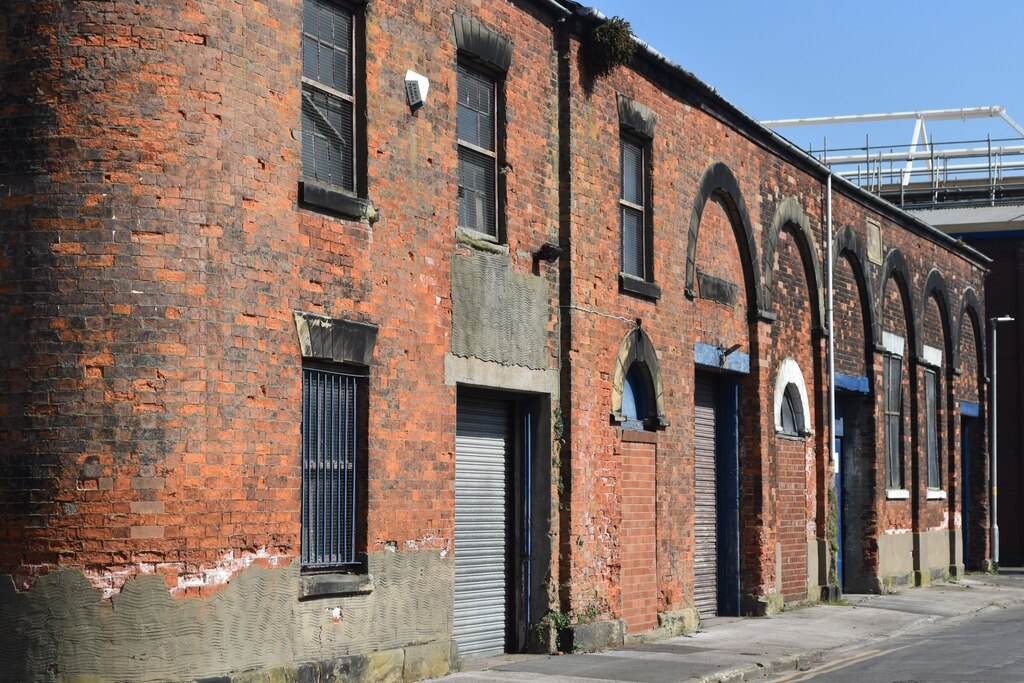
The building, in 2025

The Theatre Royal is a historic building in Goole, a town in the East Riding of Yorkshire, in England.

The building was constructed in 1842, as the Literary and Scientific Institute, containing a subscription library and a hall for events. The institute closed by 1857, following which a mechanics' institute was established in the building. In 1872, Charles Bromley converted it into a theatre. He enlarged the building to provide a stage, orchestra pit, balcony, and seating for 400. He sold it to the United Christian Army in 1882, but they sold it back to Bromley the year after. He renovated the building, and further enlarged it in 1887. By 1900, it had a capacity of 800. Bromley sold it to Hartley's Brewery in 1902, but it continued to serve as a theatre, also showing films. It closed in 1914 and the building was badly damaged during a zeppelin raid in 1915. The building was converted into a garage, and later became a builders' merchants. It was grade II listed in 1987.

The building is constructed of in brick on a plinth, with stone dressings and a Welsh slate roof. The building is on a corner site, with two storeys, nine bays on the front, three bays on the left return, and a curved corner. On the front are six full-height channelled blind round arches with dropped keystones, two smaller arches with similar surrounds, doorways, sash windows with channelled wedge lintels and dropped keystones, and an inscribed tablet.

== See also ==
- Listed buildings in Goole
