= Lowther Hotel =

Hotel in Goole, East Riding of Yorkshire, England

Coordinates: 53°42′03″N 0°52′11″W

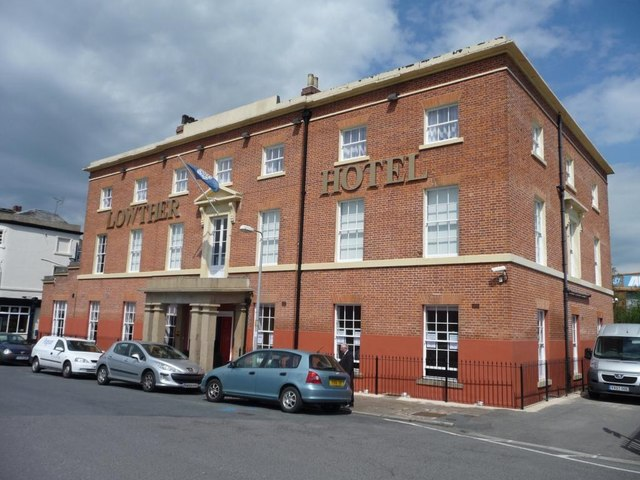
The building, in 2011

The Lowther Hotel is a historic building in Goole, a town in the East Riding of Yorkshire, in England.

The hotel was built in 1824, the first permanent structure in what was then known as New Goole. It was commissioned by Edward Banks, and was initially known as the "Banks Arms Hotel". In 1828, it was purchased by the Aire and Calder Navigation, and around 1835 it was renamed in memory of the navigation's chair, John Lowther. Board meetings were held in the hotel's first floor suite of rooms, and at times the building also served as a customs house and one of its basements as a prison cell. In 1915, it was damaged during a zeppelin raid on the town. Several extensions were constructed in the 20th century. The hotel closed for a period in the 2000s, but was restored and reopened, providing 12 bedrooms, function suites, a bar and a nightclub. A blue plaque on the building claims it is the oldest hotel in England. The building was listed in 1966, and upgraded to grade II* in 2010.

The hotel is built of red brick, with sandstone dressings, a sill band, a projecting stepped stone parapet, and a slate roof. There are three storeys, a double depth plan, and seven bays, the middle three bays projecting slightly. In the centre is a projecting flat-roofed porch with paired square columns and pilasters, and above it is a French door with an architrave and a triangular pediment on consoles. The windows are sashes under cambered gauged brick arches. To the left is a single-storey extension with a stepped parapet containing a tripartite sash window, and on its left return is an ornate timer shopfront. Inside there are wall paintings depicting the docks, portraits and medallions associated with the Aire and Calder Navigation, which are believed to have been executed between 1828 and 1830. A cannon sits atop the roof of the building, a replica of one said to have come from one of Banks' ships.

== See also ==
- Grade II* listed buildings in the East Riding of Yorkshire
- Listed buildings in Goole
