= St John's Church, Goole =

Anglican church in Goole, East Riding of Yorkshire, England

St John's Church
- Church of St John the Evangelist
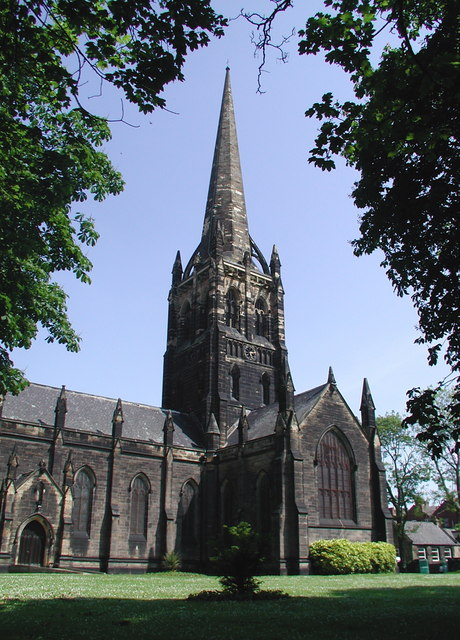
- Parish Church of St John's, Goole
- St John's Church
- 53.702647°N 0.871540°W
- OS grid reference: SE 74569 23481
- Location: Goole, East Riding of Yorkshire
- Country: England
- Denomination: Anglican
- Website: www.stjohnsgoole.org.uk

History
- Status: Parish church

Architecture
- Functional status: Active
- Heritage designation: Grade II
- Style: Gothic revival

Administration
- Province: York
- Diocese: Sheffield
- Archdeaconry: Doncaster
- Deanery: Snaith & Hatfield
- Parish: Goole

Clergy
- Vicar: Rev. Hannah Patton

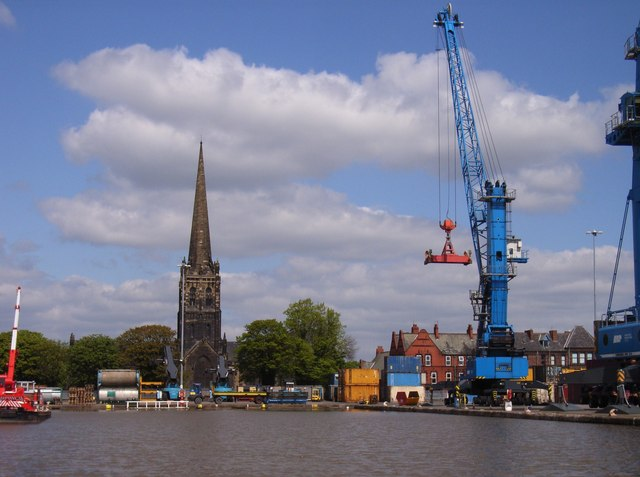
The church and spire seen from the docks

St John's Church or the Church of St John the Evangelist is an active parish church in the town of Goole, East Riding of Yorkshire, England. It was built between 1843 and 1848 in the Gothic Revival style and has been an active place of worship for Christians since. The church is located on Church Street, near to the town centre and port; it is the main parish church of the town. It is a grade I listed building.

== Early history ==
For several centuries, Goole was part of the parish of Snaith, and the villagers had to travel to Hook and Airmyn for worship. Although there were mentions of an early chapel in Old Goole, there is no concrete evidence of its existence. The Anglican community in Goole had no dedicated place of worship even after the opening of the canal in 1826, and the town's growth began.

In contrast, various non-conformist groups had established their services in Goole. The Methodists, Congregationalists, and Primitive Methodists all had their own places of worship. On 6 August 1830, permission was granted to hold Divine Service in a converted warehouse on the south side of Barge Dock, a temporary chapel nicknamed 'The Cathedral.'

The need for a dedicated Anglican church in Goole became evident, and plans for a new district church began to take shape.

== Construction ==
The foundation stone for the "new district church of St John the Evangelist" was laid on 28 June 1843. The church was generously supported by the Aire and Calder Navigation company, who not only provided the land but also donated a significant sum towards the building's cost.

Architects William Hurst and W. B. Moffat designed the church, and Messrs J. and J. Sykes of Leeds undertook its construction. The church, built on cantilever crypts, was consecrated on 25 April 1848. The total cost of the church was £9,160, raised through public subscription.

== Notable events and tragedies ==
In 1855, a fire broke out in the church tower, causing considerable damage, including the destruction of the clock and the gas lighting system.

In 1883, an east window was added. In 1868, the churchyard was closed for burials, except for those with relatives already interred there.

In 1889 when Rev. Morton, the new vicar, contracted typhoid and died due to poor sanitary conditions in Clifton Gardens.

== 20th century and beyond ==
Throughout the 20th century, St John's Church continued to be a vital part of Goole's community. The church underwent several renovations and restorations. It celebrated its centenary in April 1948, despite facing challenges in the aftermath of the Second World War.

The church's restoration work, which began in 1947, included repairing gutters, roofs, plasterwork, and improvements to prevent carbon monoxide fumes from affecting the church. The restoration work cost more than £3,500 and was completed in 1949.

== Memorials and historic features ==
St John's Church is home to various memorials and historic features, including silver wafer boxes, shipping memorials to vessels like SS Colne and SS Merville, and war memorials to commemorate those who served in the military.

The church also contains brass tablets in memory of individuals such as Frank Hind and Dr. Bell, oak panelling honouring churchwardens and sidesmen, and numerous brass tablets and other items that commemorate parishioners and significant figures in the church's history.

== See also ==
- Listed buildings in Goole
