= Goole Clock Tower =

Building in Goole, East Riding of Yorkshire, England

Coordinates: 53°42′13″N 0°52′18″W

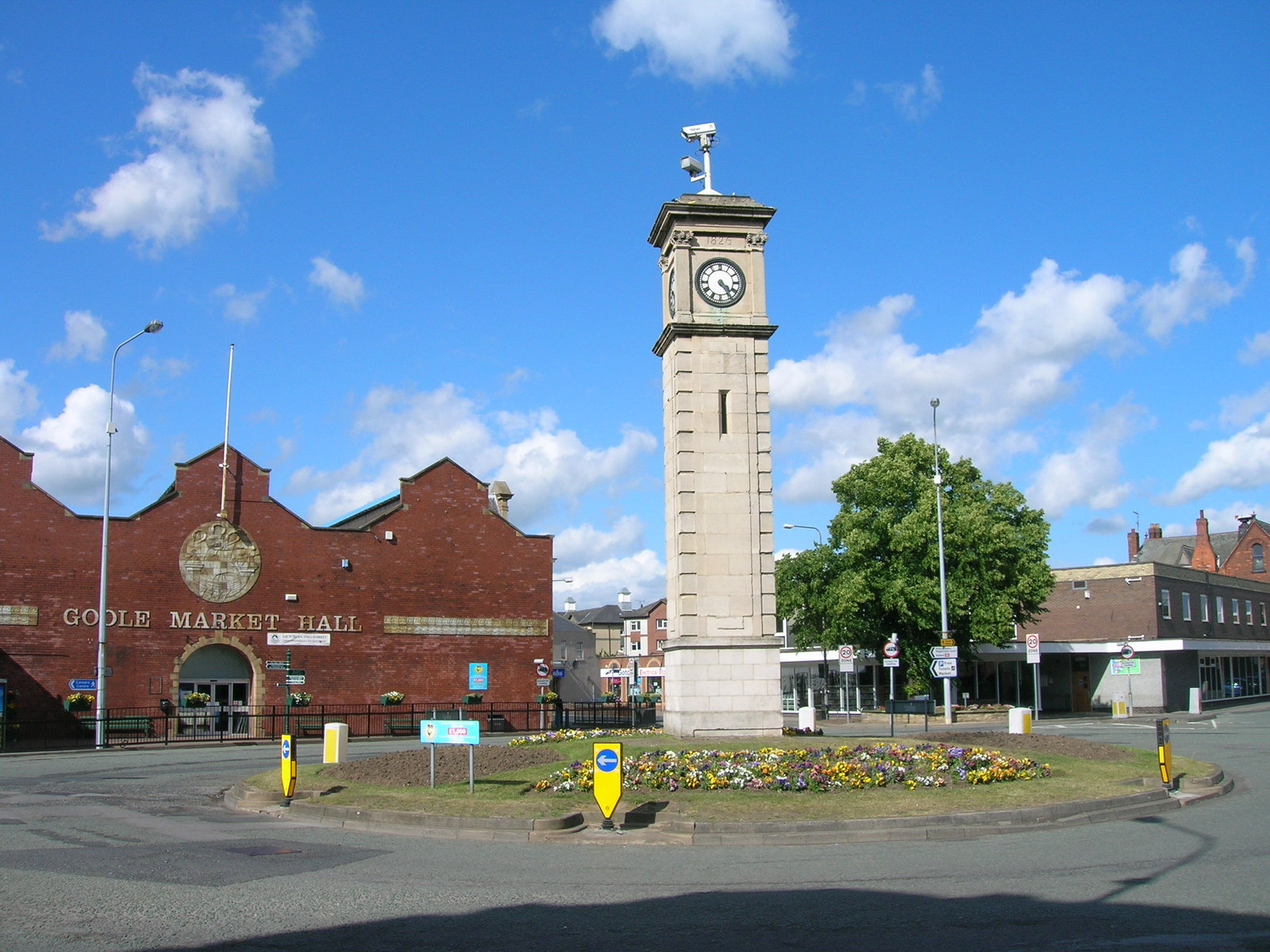
The building, in 2011

Goole Clock Tower is a historic building in Goole, a town in the East Riding of Yorkshire, in England.

The clock tower was commissioned by Goole Town Council as part of the town's centenary celebrations, to sit in the Market Square. It cost around £1,000 to build, half coming from the town's centenary fund, and half from the Aire and Calder Navigation. In 1971 the roads in the square were altered and there was a proposal to demolish the tower, but instead it was dismantled and rebuilt a few metres away. The building was grade II listed in 2026, at the time of the town's bicentenary.

The tower stands in the centre of a roundabout. It is built of stone with red brick on the interior, a square plan, sides of 1.7 metres (5 ft 7 in), a height of 10 metres (33 ft), and three stages with moulded string courses between the stages. The bottom stage is square, it stands on a plinth, and has a metal door and hatch. The tall middle stage has rusticated quoins and slit vents. The top stage contains a round clock face and the date on each side. At the corners are pilasters with Corinthian capitals. Above is a moulded cornice and a stepped cap.

== See also ==
- Listed buildings in Goole
