= Listed buildings in Goole =

Goole is a civil parish in the county of the East Riding of Yorkshire, England. It contains 31 listed buildings that are recorded in the National Heritage List for England. Of these, three are listed at Grade II*, the middle of the three grades, and the others are at Grade II, the lowest grade. The parish contains the inland port town of Goole, the most important area of which is the Port of Goole. A high proportion of the listed buildings are in the area, and include docks, boat and wagon hoists, water towers, a hydraulic accumulator tower, and a church. Elsewhere, the listed buildings include farmhouses and farm buildings, public houses and a hotel, two former windmills, a garage, sluice with a bridge, a former lock-up, a railway swing bridge, a police station and former magistrate's court, a school, a clock tower and two war memorials.

== Key ==
Grade	Criteria
II*	Particularly important buildings of more than special interest
II	Buildings of national importance and special interest

== Buildings ==
Name and location	Photograph	Date	Notes	Grade
South Airmyn Grange Farmhouse; 53.69202°N 0.89200°W	—	Mid to late 18th century	The farmhouse is in rendered brick on a plinth, with a floor band, and a slate roof with stone coped gables and shaped kneelers. There are two storeys and three bays, and to the right is a single-storey single-bay wing, and a single-story single-bay outhouse with roofs of pantile and slate. Steps lead to the central doorway that has an architrave, a three-light fanlight, and a flat stuccoed arch with a keystone. The windows are sashes in architraves with similar arched heads. The wing and outhouse contain casement windows.	II
Bridge Farmhouse; 53.69506°N 0.87532°W		Late 18th century	The house is in red brick, with stone dressings and a tile roof. There are two storeys, three bays, and a rear cross-wing. In the centre is a blocked doorway with pilasters, a radial fanlight and a dentilled open pediment. The windows are sashes with channelled wedge lintels and keystones.	II
Farm buildings north of Bridge Farmhouse; 53.69531°N 0.87544°W	—	Late 18th century	The farm buildings are in brick with pantile roofs. On the left are single-storey stables with seven bays. To the right is a two-storey three-bay building forming a loose box with a hayloft above, and a three-storey hayloft with a pigeoncote.	II
Granary, Bridge Farm; 53.69544°N 0.87483°W	—	Late 18th century	The granary is in brick, and has a tile roof with gable coping and a brick kneeler on the left. There are two storeys and five bays. On the ground floor are a segmental-arched cart entrance, a round-arched doorway and a segmental-arched opening, and the upper floor contains four blocked segmental-arched openings and a blocked pitching door.	II
Implement shed, Bridge Farm; 53.69508°N 0.87473°W	—	Late 18th century	The shed is in brick, with dentilled eaves, and a pantile roof with gable coping and a brick kneeler on the right. There is a single storey, and it contains a square-headed entry, a doorway and two segmental-headed slatted openings. On the right gable end is a doorway and an oculus, and the rear has an open front with square piers and rounded corners.	II
Shelter shed, Bridge Farm; 53.69547°N 0.87519°W	—	Late 18th century	The shelter shed forms the north range of the farm buildings. It is in brick with a roof of tile and pantile. There is a single storey and ten bays. The shed has a rear wall, and is open at the front, with round piers.	II
Threshing barn, Bridge Farm; 53.69528°N 0.87477°W	—	Late 18th century	The barn in the centre of the east range of farm buildings is in brick, and has a corrugated iron roof with gable coping and kneelers. There are two storeys and five bays. The middle bay projects and contains a doorway flanked by two rows of rectangular vent shafts. On the upper floor is a segmental-arched loading door.	II
Sluice and bridge, Earnshaw's Warping Drain; 53.68874°N 0.86150°W		Late 18th to early 19th century	The bridge carries Swinefleet Road (A161 road) over the outflow of a warping drain. The bridge is in stone, and the sluice gate is in timber with iron hoist mechanism. On the southwest face is a tunnel arch, and projecting revetment walls splayed out to each side, rising to a roadside parapet between coped rectangular piers.	II
Windmill tower northwest of Axholme Street; 53.70440°N 0.86434°W		Late 18th to early 19th century	The former windmill is in tarred yellow-orange brick, and consists of a tapering five-storey round tower with a dentilled and cogged cornice. The tower contains doorways and windows, all the original ones under segmental header arches.	II
Windmill tower, 145 Boothferry Road; 53.70675°N 0.88010°W		Late 18th to early 19th century	The former windmill is in tarred brick, and consists of a tapering four-storey round tower with a cogged cornice, and a later section containing a water tank. It contains doorways and windows, all under segmental heads.	II
Lowther Hotel; 53.70097°N 0.86981°W		1824–26	The hotel, at one time offices, is in red brick, with sandstone dressings, a sill band, a projecting stepped stone parapet, and a slate roof. There are three storeys, a double depth plan, and seven bays, the middle three bays projecting slightly. In the centre is a projecting flat-roofed porch with paired square columns and pilasters, and above it is a French door with an architrave and a triangular pediment on consoles. The windows are sashes under cambered gauged brick arches. To the left is a single-storey extension with a stepped parapet containing a tripartite sash window, and on its left return is an ornate timer shopfront. Inside there are wall paintings depicting the docks.	II*
2 Adam Street; 53.70126°N 0.86963°W		1826	A building on a corner site that has had a variety of uses, including shops and offices. It is in stuccoed brick, with end pilasters, a moulded cornice, a coped parapet and a Welsh slate roof, hipped on the corner. There are two storeys, two bays on Adam Street, and a curved bay on the corner. On the ground floor are two shopfronts, the right one curved, both have a doorway with pilasters, carved consoles, a frieze with impost blocks, a cornice and a hood. The upper floor has two sash windows in eared architraves, and a modern window on the corner. Between the sashes is an inscribed tablet.	II
11 Aire Street; 53.70133°N 0.87004°W	—	1826	A house and shop in colourwashed brick, with a sill band, a moulded corniced wooden gutter, and a Welsh slate roof. There are three storeys and two bays. On the ground floor is a shopfront on a stuccoed plinth containing a shop window with a stuccoed apron, to its right is a carved foliate and grapevine ornament, and above is a frieze and a moulded cornice. The upper floors contain sash windows under rubbed brick cambered arches.	II
Former lock-up 53.70157°N 0.86904°W	—	c. 1826	The former lock-up is in colourwashed brick, with stone dressings, stepped eaves, and a hipped Welsh slate roof. It is on a corner site, and has two storeys, a polygonal plan and a curved corner. It contains inserted double doors, an inserted fixed window and slit windows.	II
Royal Hotel; 53.70129°N 0.86991°W		1826	The public house on a corner site is in brick, partly colourwashed and partly stuccoed, with sandstone dressings and a Welsh slate roof. The main block has a plinth, a floor band, a moulded corniced gutter and round hipped roof. There are three storeys, four bays on the front, one on the right return and a curved bay on the corner. At the rear is a two-storey two-bay extension. The main entrance has attached Doric columns, an entablature, a modillion cornice and a hood. It is flanked by 19th-century shopfronts, and there is another shopfront on the corner to the right containing a doorway. On the upper floors are sash windows, some with eared architraves, and some windows are blind.	II
The Mackintosh Arms and adjacent property 53.70154°N 0.87005°W		1826	The public house and shop to the left are in colourwashed brick on a plinth, with a sill band, a plain wooden eaves bond, and a Welsh slate roof. There are three storeys and three bays. The entrance to the pub has pilasters, an entablature, a rectangular fanlight, a modillion cornice and a hood. To the right are three shop windows, and to the left is a late 19th-century shopfront. The upper floors contain sash windows under rubbed-brick cambered arches.	II
Victoria Lock and Ouse Lock; 53.70123°N 0.86777°W	—	1835–38	Ouse Lock is the older, and Victoria Lock was built in 1888. Ouse Lock is in stone, and Victoria Lock is lined in blue engineering brick with rounded stone coping. Both have wrought iron capstans and timber gates. Each capstan is about 1 metre (3 ft 3 in) in height and consists of a tapering fluted column with a square base. Both locks are 15 metres (49 ft) in width, Ouse Lock is 105 metres (344 ft) in length, and Victoria Lock is 180 metres (590 ft) in length.	II
Dry dock 53.70060°N 0.86728°W	—	1835–41	The dock is in stone, it has a rectangular plan with a tapering east end, and sides of 80 metres (260 ft) and 20 metres (66 ft), and it has a depth of 7 metres (23 ft). Apart from the west end, the sides are stepped, and at the west end is a hydraulic floating gate.	II
Adam Street Garage; 53.70133°N 0.86916°W		1841	An institute, later a theatre and subsequently a garage, it is in brick on a plinth, with stone dressings and a Welsh slate roof. The building is on a corner site, with two storeys, nine bays on the front, three bays on the left return, and a curved corner. On the front are six full-height channelled blind round arches with dropped keystones, two smaller arches with similar surrounds, doorways, sash windows with channelled wedge lintels and dropped keystones, and an inscribed tablet.	II
St John's Church; 53.70248°N 0.87208°W		1843–48	The church, funded by the Aire and Calder Navigation company, is in stone with a slate roof. It has a cruciform plan, consisting of a nave, a south porch, north and south transepts, a chancel, a polygonal vestry in the angle of the north transept and chancel, a stair turret in the angle of the south transept and chancel, and a steeple at the crossing. The steeple has a tower with three stages, angle buttresses, lancet windows, a clock face, and two-light bell openings. Above is an openwork parapet with gargoyles and wight pinnacles, and a broach spire with flying buttresses.	II
Boat hoist on south side of South Dock; 53.69685°N 0.87665°W		c. 1862	The boat hoist transferred coal from canal barge coal compartments into seagoing vessels. It has a framework of cast iron girders on stone abutments, carrying weatherboarded cabins and a turret with asphalted roofs. There is a five-stage pyramidal tower with a semicircular roofed cabin on the top stage, surmounted by a tapering domed turret.	II*
Hydraulic accumulator tower 53.69671°N 0.87709°W		Mid to late 18th century	The hydraulic accumulator tower is timber framed with weatherboarding on a chamfered stone plinth, and has a hipped asphalt roof with a finial. The plain tower is about 15 metres (49 ft) in height with a square plan, and contains a horizontally-sliding sash window, and a fragmentary balcony. Inside, there is cast iron machinery.	II
Railway swing bridge 53.71322°N 0.84211°W		1869	The bridge was built for the North Eastern Railway Company to carry its line over the River Ouse. It has wrought iron girders, and cast iron piers filled with concrete, and consists of six spans, five fixed, and one a swing span. The swing span turns on a 15 metres (49 ft) pier on seven columns, and has a square platform with a cast iron balustrade and an octagonal cabin.	II*
Brick water tower 53.70234°N 0.87839°W		1885	The water tower is in red brick, and consists of a three-stage cylindrical tower about 43 metres (141 ft) in height with a diameter of about 10 metres (33 ft). The bottom stage has a deep plinth with a stepped chamfered top, and contains a round-headed entrance with a chamfered top. The middle stage is a fluted shaft with recessed panels, and a corbelled cornice. The top stage is drum-shaped with a plinth, slit lights, a frieze, a moulded cornice and a blocking course. The water tank is in cast iron, and on the top is a sheet metal dome.	II
Police Station and Magistrates' Court; 53.70462°N 0.87143°W		1888	The building is in red brick and terracotta, with some stone, and a slate roof with lead ridges and ornate metal finials. There are two storeys and two parallel ranges. The main front has 14 bays, and has a plinth, moulded floor and eaves bands. The 1st–3rd and 11th–13th bays project under Dutch gables with an oculus. The 6th and 7th bays project under a shaped gable containing a datestone and a sunburst in a semicircular pediment. On the front are three entrances with scrolled pediments, and most of the windows have segmental arches and fluted and corniced keystones.	II
Coal wagon hoist, railway approach and control boxes 53.70054°N 0.87402°W		1906	The hoist raised a coal wagon and tilted it to tip its contents into a ship. It is in steel with wooden platforms, and consists of a five-storey tower with a central well of riveted lattice construction with a flat roof. On the west are angled girder buttresses. It was approached by a ramp from a railway viaduct in brick with stone dressings. One segmental arch of the viaduct has survived, and there is a timber control cabin with a hipped slate roof. The cabin has a doorway, a casement window, and two horizontally sliding sash windows.	II
Grammar school 53.70773°N 0.88378°W		1907–09	The school is in pale yellow-orange brick on a plinth, with dressings in orange brick and stone, quoins and a five-course floor band. The roof of the main block is in Westmorland slate, and elsewhere it is in stone slate and tile. There are two storeys, and an assembly hall with three storeys. The central range has 17 bays, the middle five bays under a pediment containing a round-arched inscribed panel, and the outer three bays project. Outside these are three-bay ranges linking with six-bay pavilion wings. In the centre, the entrance has an architrave, a moulded cornice, and a blocking course containing a cartouche with a coat of arms. The windows are sashes, some tripartite. On the roof is an octagonal cupola with a lead dome, and a weathervane with a gilded ship.	II
Cenotaph; 53.70721°N 0.88296°W		1922	The war memorial stands in a memorial garden, it is in Portland stone, and is modelled on The Cenotaph in Whitehall, London. It is about 5.5 metres (18 ft) in height, with a rectangular plan, and on the top is a chest tomb. On the front are inscriptions and dates, and carved laurel wreaths. Elsewhere, there are bronze plaques with the names of those lost in the First World War.	II
Zeppelin Air Raid Memorial; 53.70967°N 0.84964°W		1922	The memorial in Goole Cemetery is over the mass grave of 16 people killed in a Zeppelin air raid in 1915. It consists of an open book in white marble inscribed with the names of those lost. The book is on a lectern in Portland stone on a stepped plinth. It stands in a rectangular enclosure surrounded by curbs in Portland stone.	II
Clock tower 53.70361°N 0.87162°W		1927	The clock tower stands in the centre of a roundabout. It is in stone with red brick on the interior, a square plan, sides of 1.7 metres (5 ft 7 in), a height of 10 metres (33 ft), and three stages with moulded string courses between the stages. The bottom stage is square, it stands on a plinth, and has a metal door and hatch. The tall middle stage has rusticated quoins and slit vents. The top stage contains a round clock face and the date on each side. At the corners are pilasters with Corinthian capitals. Above is a moulded cornice and a stepped cap.	II
Concrete water tower 53.70256°N 0.87847°W		1927	The water tower is in reinforced concrete, and is circular, with a diameter of 27.5 metres (90 ft) and a height of 44 metres (144 ft). There are eight stages, with a central seven-stage tower enclosed in an open framework, carrying a drum-shaped tank surmounted by a concrete balustrade. The tower has pilaster strips and bands between the stages, and the framework has a tall arched arcade of 24 closely set square piers.	II
