= Laurence Clancy =

English author on aerodynamics (1929 to 2014)

Laurence Joseph Clancy (15 March 1929 – 16 October 2014) was an Education Officer in aerodynamics at Royal Air Force College Cranwell where his textbook Aerodynamics became standard.

He was born in Egypt to Alfred Joseph Clancy and Agnes Hunter. In 1951 he gained a Bachelor of Science (Hons) degree from the University of Liverpool.

Clancy studied aerodynamics at the College of Aeronautics at RAF Cranfield, where his teachers were Terence Nonweiler, later of Glasgow University, and Geoffrey Lilley, later of Southampton University. Clancy qualified as an Education Officer with the RAF and began teaching at Royal Air Force College Cranwell.

After 16 years with the Royal Air Force, Clancy had a long career at the University of Bradford where he served as Dean of Engineering. He was a colleague of John Brian Helliwell.

He married Barbara Consterdine in 1952, they separated in 1969. He has four children from this marriage, Peter, Helen, Caroline & Jillian. In 1972 he married Eileen Tyne,(Nee Smith), they separated in 1986. He was married to Jane Bingham. from 1992 until his death.

== Aerodynamics ==
Clancy assembled a manuscript from his lectures. In 1975 Pitman published it as the textbook Aerodynamics. It was re-issued in 1978 by John Wiley & Sons, and in 1986 by Longman. A book review in Journal of Fluid Mechanics described the book as follows:

The scope of the book is wide and includes the mechanics of flight and aircraft performance in addition to the usual topics of basic fluid mechanics, aerofoil and wing theory, boundary layer theory, gas dynamics and experimental techniques.

In his preface, Clancy portrayed aerodynamics as both an exact and experimental science:

The true aerodynamicist … must combine [mathematics and experiment], using analysis to deepen and extend his knowledge, but continually experimenting in order to check the validity of his assumptions and to improve his understanding of the physical problem. (page xviii)

Reviewer M.W. for Flight International wrote, "The author has a lucid style and puts across a traditionally difficult subject in such a way that the less prepared reader is able to follow the arguments of even the knottiest topics."
