= Timm's Mill =

Windmill in Goole, East Riding of Yorkshire, England

Coordinates: 53°42′24″N 0°52′48″W

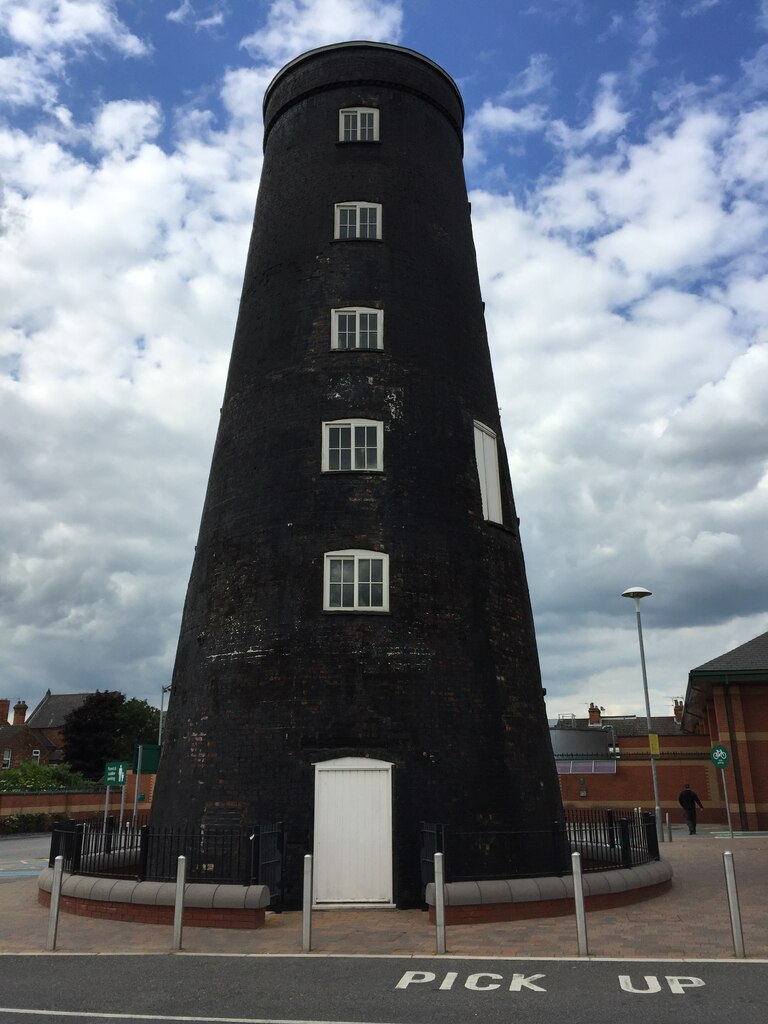
The building, in 2016

Timm's Mill is a historic building in Goole, a town in the East Riding of Yorkshire, in England.

The windmill was built around 1800, near the Boothferry Road. Shortly before 1854, it was extended with a three-storey roller flour mill building containing a steam engine. In 1863, the mill was leased by Edward Timm, and in 1868 he purchased the mill and outbuildings for £1,500. The family business continued to develop the site until closure in 2001, the work including internal alterations to the windmill. The roller flour mill and other buildings were then demolished and replaced by a supermarket. The windmill survives, and has been grade II listed since 1987.

The former windmill is built of tarred brick, and consists of a tapering four-storey round tower with a cogged cornice, and a later section containing a water tank. It contains doorways and windows, all under segmental heads. Inside, 20th-century machinery survives.

== See also ==
- Listed buildings in Goole
