= Goole Market Hall =

Building in Goole, East Riding of Yorkshire, England

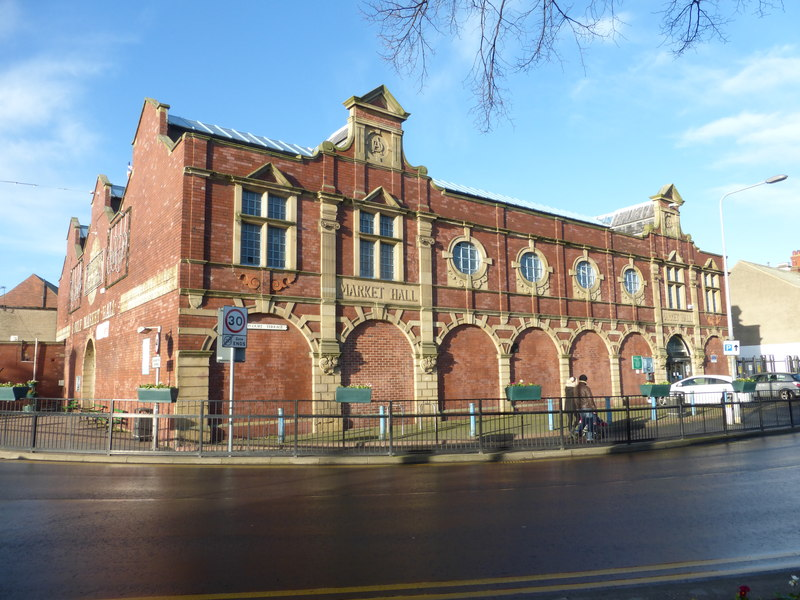
The building, in 2014

Goole Market Hall is a commercial and civic building in Goole, a town in the East Riding of Yorkshire, in England.

The first market hall in Goole was constructed facing the Market Place but burned down in 1891. A replacement was completed in 1896. In addition to housing regular markets, it was used for a variety of events, including serving as a roller rink. In the late 20th century, fixed stalls were constructed in the hall. Due to a decline in trade, the market closed in 2019.

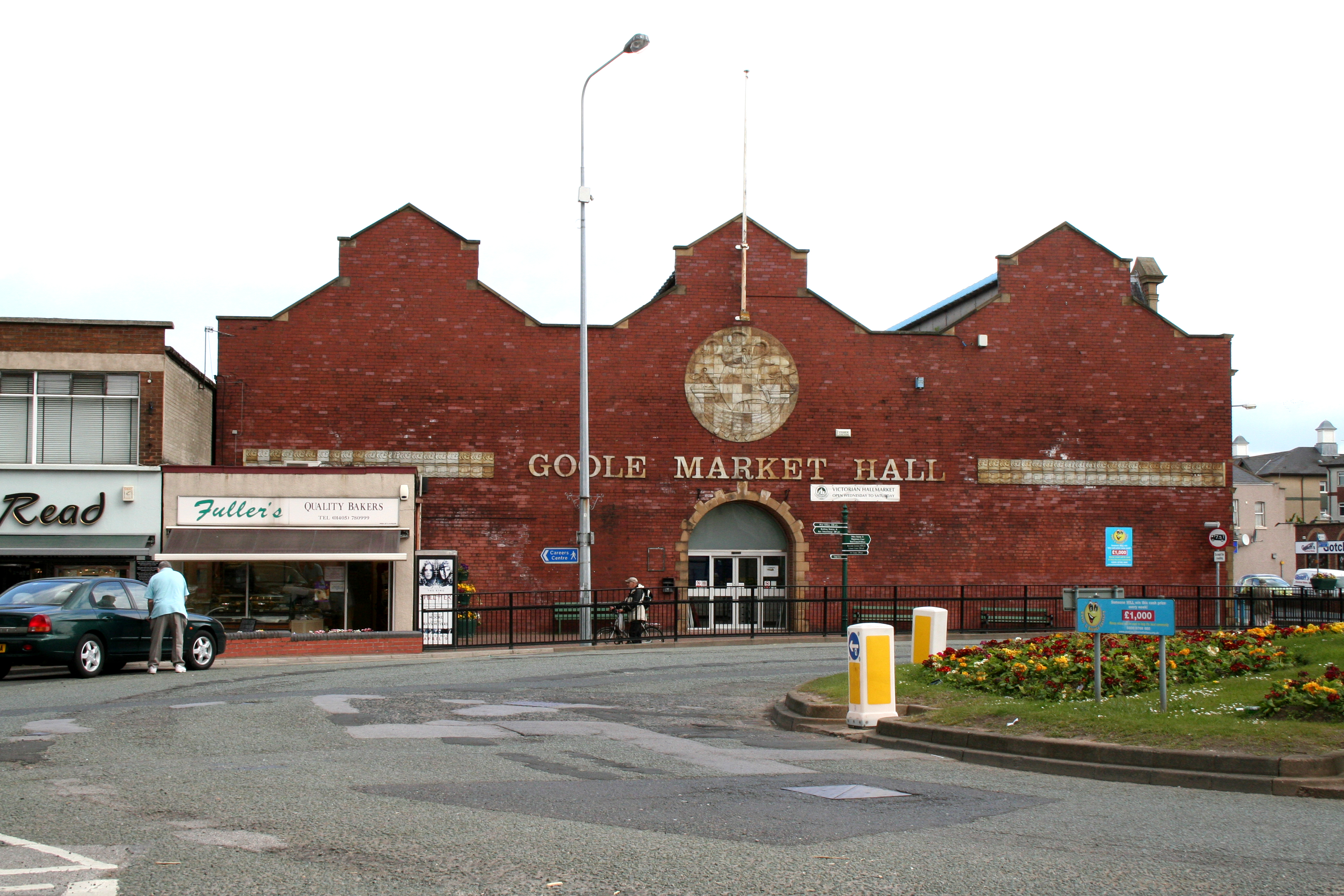
Frontage to the Market Place

The building was renovated by William Birch & Sons at a cost of £4,000,000, the work including the replacement of the roof and windows. It reopened in 2026, providing a food hall, a bar run by Brew York, and space for community events and live music.
