= Barrie Rickards =

British palaeontologist and famous angler

- Born: 12 June 1938; Leeds, England, United Kingdom
- Died: November 5, 2009 (aged 71); Cambridge, England, United Kingdom
- Education: University of Hull (B.Sc., 1960; PhD, 1963)
- Known for: Graptolites and pike fishing
- Awards: Lyell Medal, 1997
- Scientific career
- Fields: Palaeontology, Stratigraphy & Angling
- Workplaces: University College, London; Trinity College, Dublin; University of Cambridge
- Doctoral students: Sue Rigby

Richard Barrie Rickards (12 June 1938 – 5 November 2009), was Professor of Palaeontology and Biostratigraphy at the Department of Earth Sciences, Cambridge University and Life Fellow of Emmanuel College. He was best known for his work on graptolites. He was also a well-respected angler, the author or co-author of 31 books on fishing, fish and their habitats and the role of angling in society, and was President of the National Association of Specialist Anglers and the Lure Anglers' Society.

He died from cancer on 5 November 2009, but was active to the end, writing books on fishing and papers on graptolites from his hospital bed and pursuing research when at home in remission.

== Education and academic career ==
Rickards grew up in Leeds and Goole in Yorkshire. He attended Goole Grammar School. He studied chemistry and then geology at the University of Hull, graduating with a BSc in geology in 1960, and a PhD in 1963. Rickards was later awarded an ScD from the University of Cambridge, and a DSc from the University of Hull.

He held short-term academic posts at University College, London and Trinity College, Dublin, before taking up a lectureship in Cambridge in 1969. During the course of his time in Cambridge he was a curator of the Sedgwick Museum. Rickards was promoted to Reader in 1991, and to Professor of Palaeontology and Biostratigrapy in 2000. He retired in 2005, but remained active in research as an emeritus professor.

=== Research ===
Rickards' work concentrated on the systematics and biodiversity of graptolites in the Palaeozoic. This led to a better understanding of their paleobiogeography and evolution, the manner of their recovery from mass extinctions, and a more precise understanding of Lazarus taxa, refugia and relict faunas.

== Fishing ==
Rickards was one of the best-known and most successful pike anglers in Britain. He was a Founding Fellow of the Pike Anglers' Club, and was past President of the Pike Society, the Lure Anglers' Society and the Specialist Anglers' Alliance.

== Selected publications ==
Rickards wrote over 250 academic papers, 700 articles on fishing and some 30 books related to both fishing and palaeontology.

- Leggett, J.K., McKerrow, W.S., Cocks, L.R.M. & Rickards, R.B. 1981, "Periodicity in the early Palaeozoic marine realm ( British Isles).", Journal, Geological Society, vol. 138, no. 2, pp. 167–176.
- Cuerda, A.J., Rickards, R.B. & Cingolani, C. 1988, "A new Ordovician-Silurian boundary section in San Juan Province, Argentina, and its definitive graptolite fauna", Journal - Geological Society of London, vol. 145, no. 5, pp. 749–757.
- Rickards, R.B. 1995, "Utility and precision of Silurian graptolite biozones", Lethaia, vol. 28, no. 2, pp. 129–137.
- Rickards, R.B., Packham, G.H., Wright, A.J. & Williamson, P.L. 1995, "Wenlock and Ludlow graptolite faunas and biostratigraphy of the Quarry Creek district, New South Wales", Memoir - Association of Australasian Palaeontologists, vol. 17.
- Dean, W.T., Monod, O., Rickards, R.B., Demir, O. & Bultynck, P. 2000, "Lower Palaeozoic stratigraphy and palaeontology, Karadere-Zirze area, Pontus mountains, northern Turkey", Geological Magazine, vol. 137, no. 5, pp. 555–582.
- Rickards, R.B. 2002, "The graptolitic age of the type Ashgill Series (Ordovician), Cumbria, UK", Proceedings of the Yorkshire Geological Society, vol. 54, no. 1, pp. 1–16.
- Rickards, B. 2007, Richard Walker: Biography of an Angling Legend. Medlar Press, 320pp

== Recognition and legacy ==
Rickards was awarded the Lyell Medal of The Geological Society in 1997.

After Rickards' death, the Proceedings of the Yorkshire Geological Society published a collection of papers on graptolites, in his honour. The editors of the volume noted that this was one of Rickards' favourite journals, and one where he had published a number of his papers.

Rickards' papers are held in the archives of the Sedgwick museum, Cambridge.
