= John Brian Helliwell =

British mathematician

John Brian Helliwell FRSE FIMA (1924–1992) was a British mathematician and astrophysicist. He was Professor of Engineering Mathematics at Bradford University 1968 to 1985. He is remembered for his work on the behaviour of gases at transonic speeds and upon the action of conductive gases within magnetic fields.

== Life ==
He was born in York on 2 January 1924. He was educated at Goole Grammar School He then studied at the University of Leeds, graduating with a BSc in 1945. His studies were interrupted by the Second World War during which he served first at the Royal Aircraft Establishment in Farnborough then in the gas department of Metropolitan-Vickers in Manchester. He gained his PhD from Leeds in 1949 on the subject of control theory.

After his PhD he remained in academia, first at Birmingham and Manchester, then as a Lecturer at the Royal College of Science and Technology in Glasgow, now known as Strathclyde University. In 1963 he was elected a Fellow of the Royal Society of Edinburgh. His proposers were Donald Pack, Benjamin Noble, Reginald Lord, and Patrick Dunbar Ritchie.

In 1967 he moved to Bradford as Professor of Engineering Mathematics at Bradford University, until his retirement due to ill-health in 1985. He returned to North Yorkshire where he died on 14 July 1992.

== Family ==
In 1951 he married Joyce Hutchinson. They had three daughters.
