= Goole Academy =

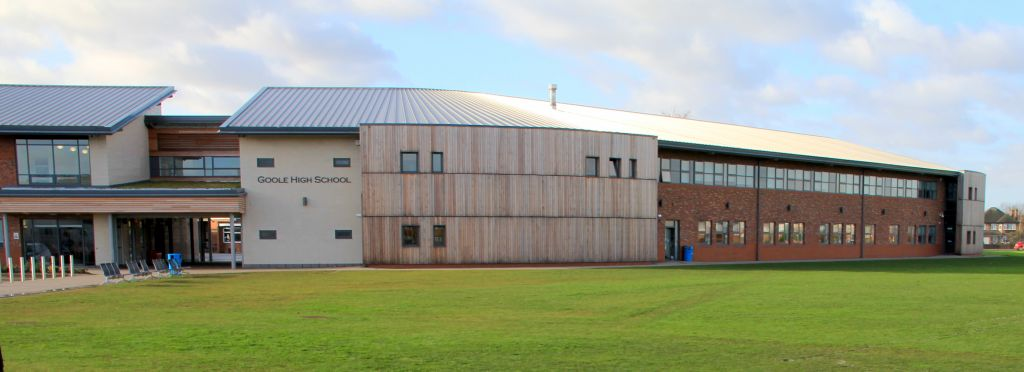
- Goole Academy

Location
- Centenary Road; Goole, East Riding of Yorkshire, DN14 6AN; England; 53.708170°N 0.883780°W

Information
- Type: Academy
- Motto: exceed expectations
- Established: 1909
- Local authority: East Riding of Yorkshire
- Department for Education URN: 145929 Tables
- Ofsted: Reports
- Head teacher: Kirsty Holt
- Gender: Mixed
- Age: 11 to 16
- Enrolment: 1350
- Former name: Goole High school
- Website: gooleacademy.org.uk

Goole Academy is a mixed 11–16 secondary school in Goole, East Riding of Yorkshire, England. It is just off the A614 road in the east of Goole.

== History ==
The school's original motto was Alta Pete, Latin for "Aim High".

=== Grammar school ===
The school was first opened as Goole Grammar School in 1909, making it the longest-running school in Goole. It was administered by West Riding County Council, based in Wakefield. It was a four form-entry coeducational school on Boothferry Road with 750 boys and girls. Goole Secondary Modern School was on the opposite side of Boothferry Road, which was built in 1936, and had 1,100 boys and girls.

=== Comprehensive ===
In September 1973 the school became a twelve form-entry comprehensive upper school for ages 13–18. It initially retained the name Goole Grammar School with 1,100 boys and girls. From April 1974 it was administered by Humberside Education Committee. The former secondary modern school became Bartholomew Middle School (became Goole College, which closed in 2021).

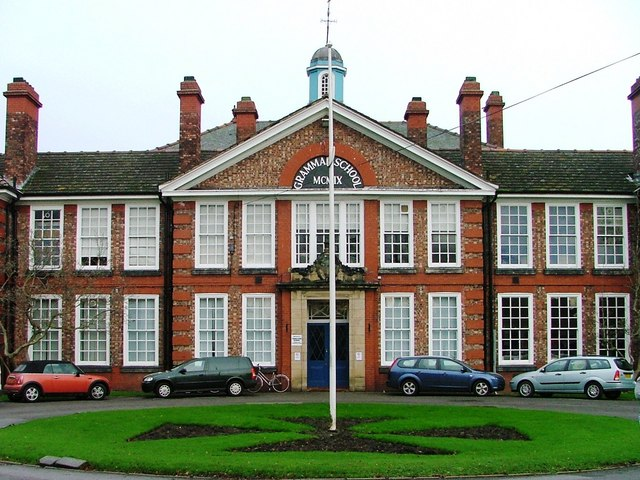
Facade of Vermuyden School in 2006

In the 1980s the school was still a 13–18 upper school and called Goole Grammar School. In 1990 the school's name was changed to Vermuyden School, after Cornelius Vermuyden.

In 2009, following consultation with students and the local community, it was renamed Goole High School and, after a student survey, a new school uniform was introduced. The motto was changed to 'Daring to be Excellent'.

=== Academy ===
Goole Academy gained academy status in 2011. The school receives funding directly from central government but still has links with the East Riding of Yorkshire Council.

The school underwent transformation with a stage two of a £15 million new build. Subsequently, partly through the school being one of the first three nationally to receive funding through the government's Priority Schools Building Fund, a further multi-million pound sum is to be spent on the next phase of the creation of a three-storey new build to house the CREATE Studio School, an Academy School suite and a creative arts suite, with drama and dance halls, and a library.

It will also fund renovation of the original Edwardian building and reinstatement of the Edwardian listed gardens fronting Boothferry Road, the return of the car park on Airmyn Road to tennis courts and the demolition of some non-historical parts of the site to make way for the creation of landscaped outside areas.

== Academic performance and inspections ==
In 2013, as Goole High School Academy of Excellence, the school was inspected and found inadequate and requiring special measures. It was inspected again in 2015, as Goole Academy, and found to have improved "beyond recognition", although sixth-form provision was inadequate; the overall judgement was requires improvement. As of 2024, the most recent inspection was in 2022, with an outcome of good.

== Notable staff ==
Peter Teed was headteacher of the grammar school for 21 years, and his wife, artist Shirley Teed, designed costumes for school plays and mentored staff and students. Peter Teed was reported by The Yorkshire Post to have introduced to the school "innovative practices as vocational qualifications and coursework assessments long before they became standard practice", and to have "adopted an inclusive approach, opening the sixth form to pupils from Goole’s Secondary Modern school and steering it through the transition to a comprehensive unit".

The actor Ian McElhinney taught drama at the school in the 1970s.

== Notable former pupils ==
=== Goole Grammar School ===
- Gavin Bryars, composer and double bassist
- Edwin A. Dawes, biochemist and magician
- Colin Graves, entrepreneur, founder of Costcutter, chair of Yorkshire County Cricket Club
- John Brian Helliwell, mathematician
- Barrie Rickards, palaeontologist and angler

== See also ==
- Cornelius Vermuyden School and Arts College in Essex
- Listed buildings in Goole
