= West Park, Goole =

Park in Goole, East Riding of Yorkshire, England

West Park
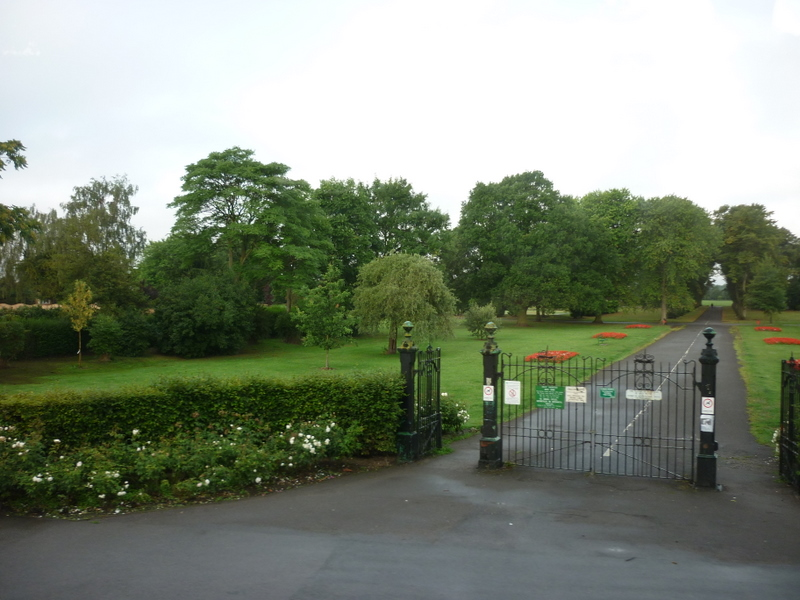
- Entrance from Airmyn Road
- Interactive map of West Park
- Type: Urban Park
- Location: Goole, East Riding of Yorkshire, England
- Coordinates: 53.7108°N 0.8939°W
- Area: 38 acres (15 ha)
- Created: 13 September 1923
- Operator: Goole Town Council
- Open: All year
- Website: Goole Town Council

West Park is an urban park in Goole, East Riding of Yorkshire, England. It was opened in 1923 and is the largest park in the town.

== History ==
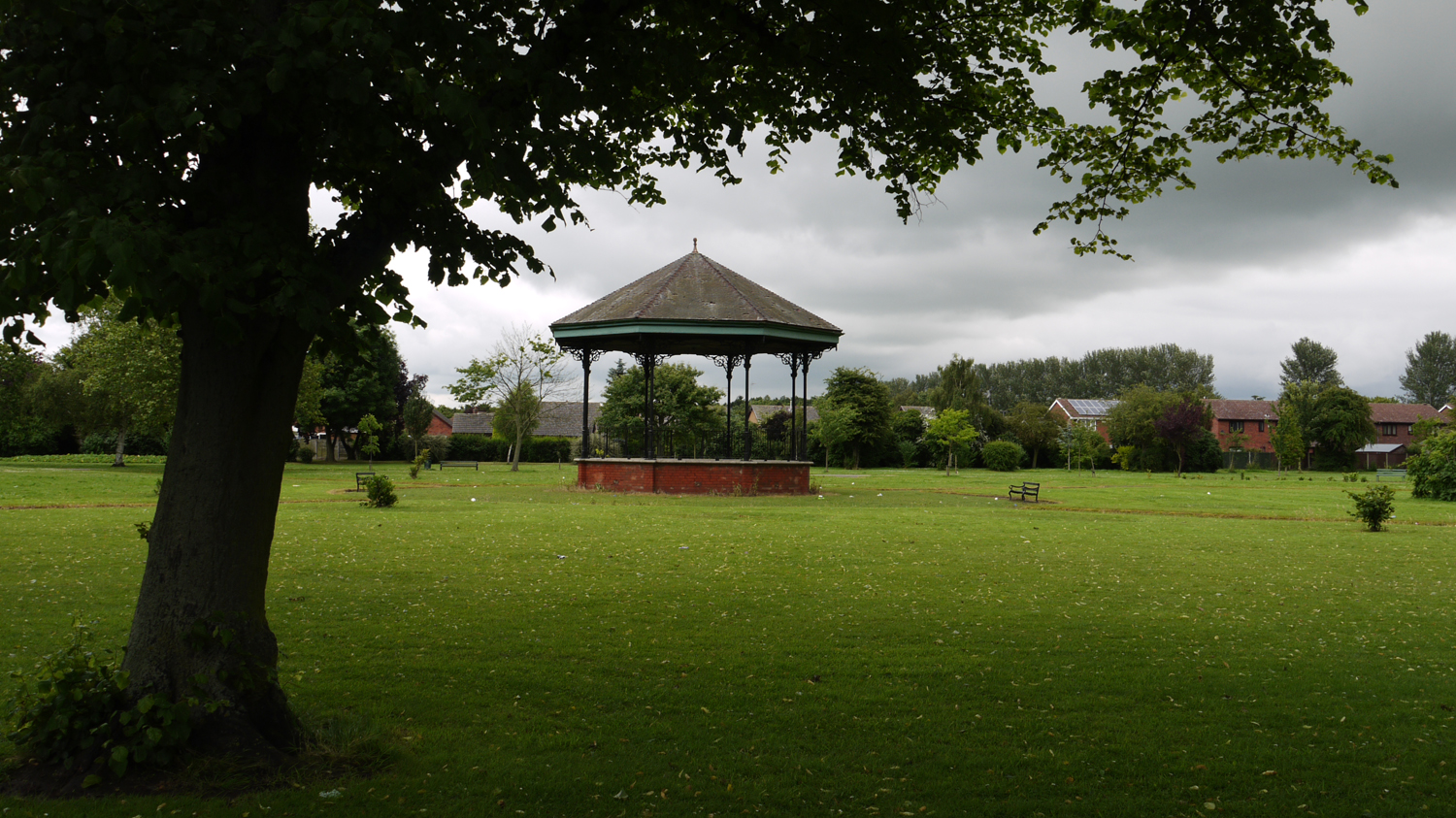
Bandstand in West Park

The park opened on 13 September 1923 with funds given by the "Unemployed Grants Committee", with most of the work being completed by unemployed men of the town many of which had been laid off when the Goole Steam Shipping Company reduced its fleet from 25 to 14. The park had a range of buildings including a bandstand, shelters, a tearoom, toilets, crown green bowling, grass and hard court tennis, football, hockey, a paddling pool, a model yachting pool, and a children's play area. In 1926 Goole had its centenary and the celebrations were centred on the park, they included a week of events, processions and a pageant. In 1933 HRH Prince George visited the park and planted an Oak tree to commemorate his visit to the town. In 2011 the park was given a Heritage Lottery Fund award of almost £1 million to regenerate the facilities.

== Facilities ==
There is a cafe, children's play area, sport and fitness equipment, a multi-use games area, basketball rings, BMX tracks, sport pitches and a bowling green. The park hosts seasonal events including Easter egg hunts, pumpkin carving, bandstand concerts, fairs and bonfire night. Goole Parkrun takes place every Saturday morning starting at 9am, the course is 5000m (5 km) long and run on both tarmac paths and grass. West Park is the largest public park in Goole covering over 32 acres.
