= Reginald Lord =

English cricketer

Personal information
- Full name: Reginald Arthur Lord
- Born: 29 January 1905; Beckenham, Kent, England
- Died: 10 June 1997 (aged 92); Willingdon, Sussex, England
- Batting: Right-handed
- Bowling: Slow left-arm orthodox

Domestic team information
- Years: Team
- 1924–1925: Oxford University

Career statistics
Competition	First-class
Matches	3
Runs scored	57
Batting average	9.50
100s/50s	–/–
Top score	21
Catches/stumpings	–/–
- Source: Cricinfo, 25 July 2019

Reginald Arthur Lord (29 January 1905 – 10 June 1997) was an English first-class cricketer.

Lord was born at Beckenham in January 1905. He was educated at Marlborough College, before going up to St John's College, Oxford. While studying at Oxford, he made his debut in first-class cricket for Oxford University against Middlesex at Oxford in 1924. He made two further appearances in first-class cricket, making a further appearance for Oxford against the Free Foresters in 1925, before playing against Oxford for H. D. G. Leveson-Gower's XI at Eastbourne in 1926. He scored 57 runs in his three first-class matches, with a high score of 21. He later served in the Second World War with the Royal Air Force, enlisting as a pilot officer in August 1940. He was promoted to the rank of flight lieutenant in November 1941, while in January 1943 he was made a temporary squadron leader. He resigned his commission nine years after the conclusion of the war, in July 1954, retaining the rank of squadron leader. Following the war, he taught for nearly fifty years at the St Bede's School, Eastbourne. He was still teaching four mornings a week in 1993, when he was 88. He died in June 1997 at Willingdon, Sussex.
