= Port of Goole =

Maritime port in Yorkshire, England

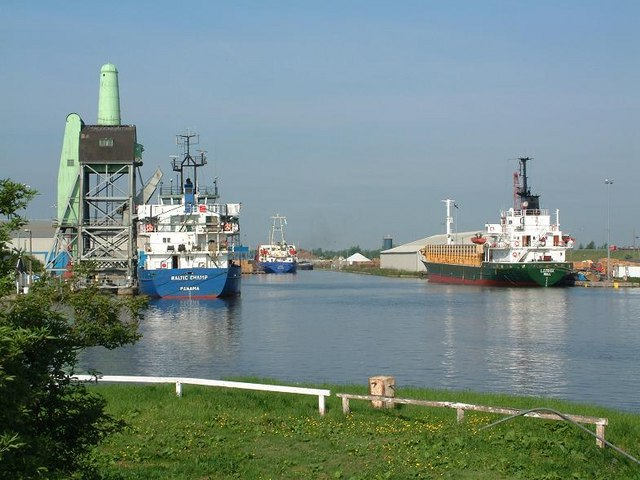
- South Dock, Goole
- Interactive map of Port of Goole
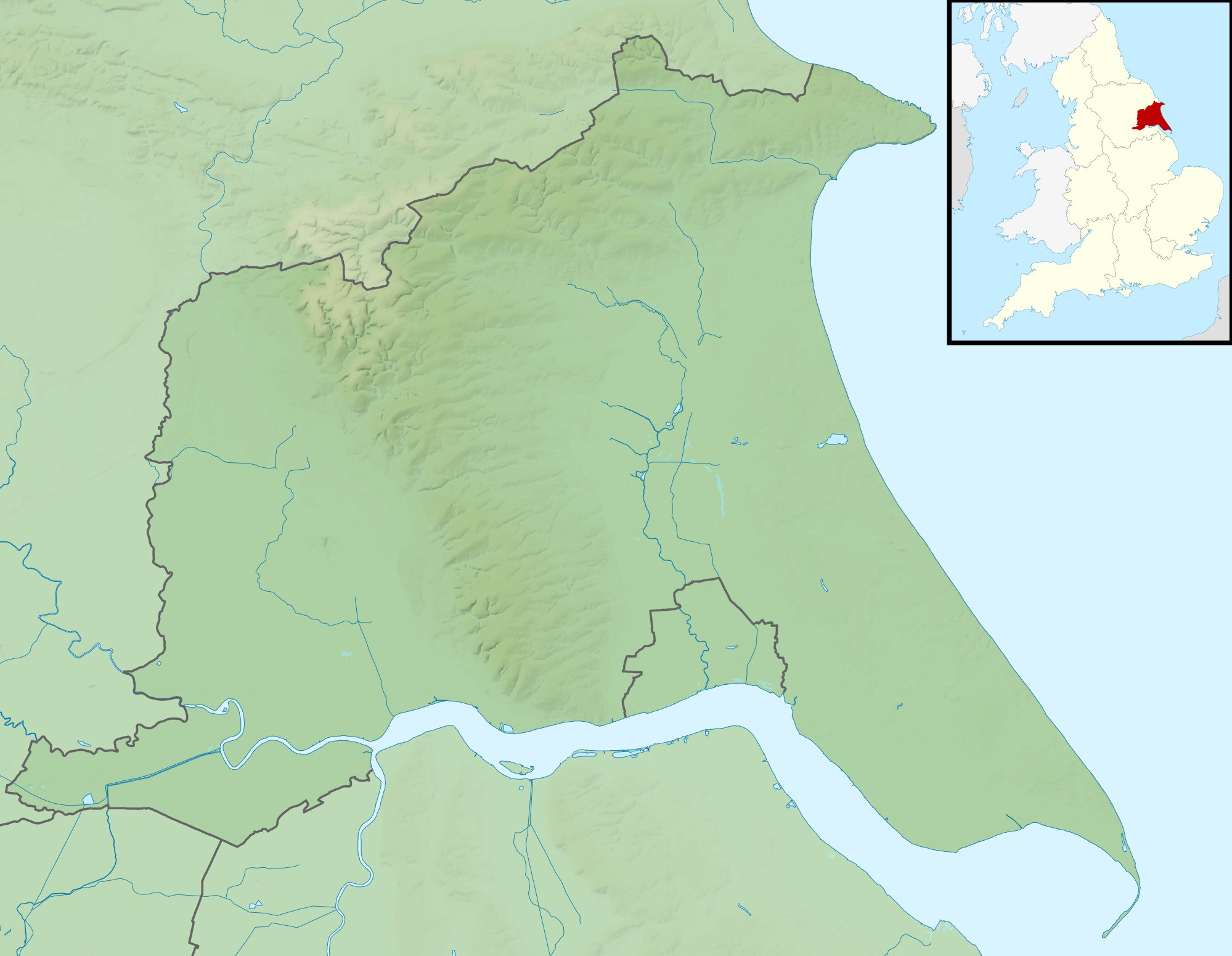
- Location within East Riding of Yorkshire

Location
- Country: England
- Location: Goole, East Riding of Yorkshire
- Coordinates: 53.698°N 0.874°W
- GB Gridref: SE742231
- UN/LOCODE: GB GOO

Details
- Opened: 1826
- Owned by: Associated British Ports
- Type of Harbor: Canal
- Size: 40.4 hectares (100 acres)
- Draft depth: 5.5 metres (18 ft)

Statistics
- Annual cargo tonnage: 1,228,000 tonnes (1,354,000 tons) (2021)
- Website; Official website

The Port of Goole (also known as Goole Docks and The Port in Green Fields), is a maritime port at the mouth of the Aire and Calder Navigation where it feeds into the River Ouse, in the East Riding of Yorkshire, England. The port opened in 1826, when the Aire and Calder Navigation was completed, connecting to the River Ouse at what is now the town of Goole. The port is one of the Humber Ports, associated with the waterway of the Humber Estuary and its tributaries, and is known to be Britain's largest inland port, being some 50 miles (80 km) from the open sea. It has good road and rail transport links, and deals with about £800 million worth of trade each year.

Originally the port was in the West Riding of Yorkshire, but was transferred to Humberside in 1974, then it was moved into the East Riding of Yorkshire in 1996.

== History ==
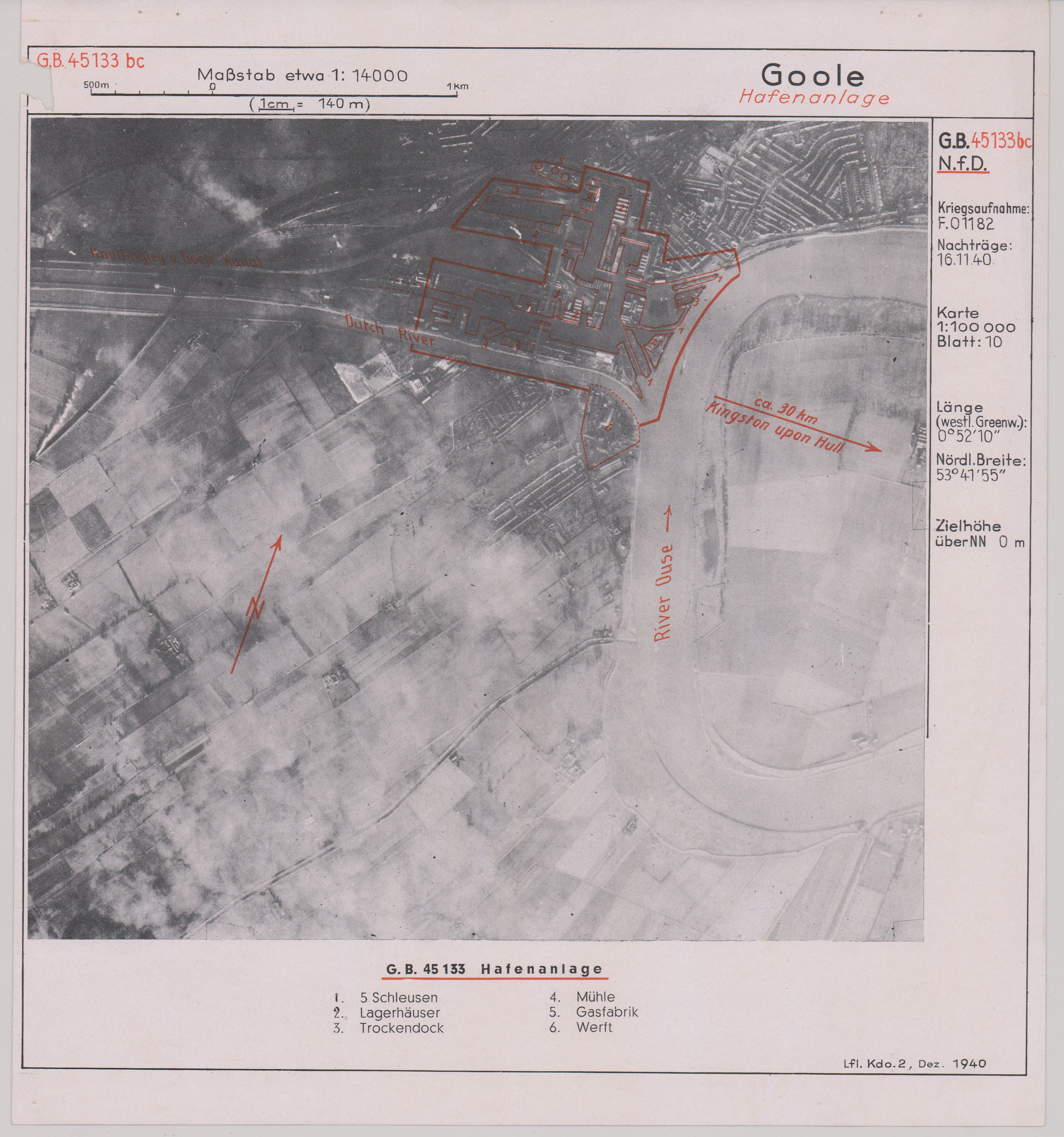
Port of Goole on a target dossier of the German Luftwaffe, 1940

Whilst the location of Goole as a settlement has been around since Anglo-Saxon times, the land surrounding the area of Goole was marshy, and only drained when King Charles I granted Cornelius Vermuyden the right to drain the land and divert the River Don into the Ouse, rather than the Trent. The River Don had hitherto drained eastwards directly into the Trent at Adlingfleet. Prior to the diversion of the River Don (which became known as the Dutch River), and the opening of the Aire and Calder Navigation, Goole itself was a tiny hamlet, on the south bank of the River Ouse. In 1821, five years before the port was opened, the population of Goole was listed as 450; by 1831, it had increased threefold to 1,671. By 1901, the town had grown to 4,549 residents. The port was completed and opened in July 1826, but Goole itself was not recognised legally as a port town until 1828. However, the effect of the township's creation led to it being a point of reference locally. When land was advertised for sale in local newspapers, hamlets in the area were always advertised as being "near Howden..", this changed to being "near Goole."

The proprietors of the canal sought to exploit the increasing coal trade which was being mined further inland in the West Riding of Yorkshire. Prior to the opening of the Aire and Calder Navigation, Selby was the port of transhipment for coal from the West Riding, but by 1828, Goole had supplanted Selby as the exporting hub in the region. In addition to the coal trade, Goole was not only further downriver, but the section of the Ouse between Selby and Goole was beset by several meanders (what Baron Duckham labelled as a "torturous voyage"), which made it harder for larger shipping to navigate. The proprietors of Goole docks were keen to achieve foreign trade status, a desired marque awarded by the Board of Customs. Initially, the comptroller was resistant to this, however, the board was suitably impressed enough by the dock operation to grant the award, much to the consternation of those operating Hull docks. By 1840 Goole was exporting 100,000 tonnes (110,000 tons) of coal each year; four times the amount being shipped out of Hull docks.

Trade through the port suffered during the First World War, the Depression and the Second World War. The reorganisation of the British Ports, a UK government white paper, took effect on 1 January 1963, and Goole became one of 19 ports operated by the British Transport Docks Board across Great Britain. (Note: The other 18 were; Ayr, Barrow, Barry, Cardiff, Fleetwood, Garston, Grimsby, Hull, Immingham, King's Lynn, Lowestoft, Newport, Plymouth (Millbay), Port Talbot, Silloth, Southampton, Swansea, and Troon) Up until 1974, the port was in the West Riding of Yorkshire, but it was moved into the new county of Humberside. This itself was abolished in 1996, and Goole was moved into the East Riding of Yorkshire.

In 1983, the British Transport Docks Board was wound-up, with all assets being privatised, Goole Docks was acquired by Associated British Ports (ABP). The port was granted Freeport status in 2021, along with the other Humber ports of Grimsby, Hull and Immingham.

== Geography ==
The port is connected at the west end to the Aire and Calder Navigation, with the Dutch River (the new course of the River Don) immediately to the south of the canal, and they run alongside each other to the west for 6 miles (9.7 km). Initially, the port only had two locks; Barge Lock (3 acres (1.2 ha)) controlled entry into the River Ouse, and Ship Lock (2.75 acres (1.11 ha)) was a little further north, connected to the canal end of Barge Dock. Despite the small size of both locks, they could hold about 60 ships and 200 barges, and the nascent port was known to be quite efficient at the transshipment of goods. A timber pond was built on the western approach to the dock on the Aire and Calder Navigation, but this was later developed into South Dock. In 1838, the port was expanded by the addition of Ouse Dock (which still exists) and was noted for is width of 58 feet (18 m), built to accommodate paddle steamers. In 1845, the Wakefield, Pontefract and Goole Railway, lodged an application to Parliament to build a railway to the docks at Goole, something which the dock proprietors initially resisted, however, the railway was completed in 1848.

In the early days of the port's development, it was called The Port in Green Fields, due to its rural location surrounded by fields. The name was later attributed to Lord Baden-Powell. Between 1826 and 1974, the port was in the West Riding of Yorkshire (the River Ouse being the boundary between the West and East Ridings at that location), making Goole one of only two seaports in the West Riding of Yorkshire (the other being Selby). From 1974 until 1996, the area was administered as part of Humberside's County Council area.

The modern-day port has the A161 link road running through it, which crosses the canal on a swing bridge built in 1899, and over the Dutch River on a swing bridge also. The A161 connects to the M62 motorway on the west side of Goole. Railfreight serves the port in the form of steel exports from Scunthorpe and Rotherham. The port, known to be the largest inland port in Britain, lies some 50 miles (80 km) from the sea via the Humber Estuary. The present day docks handle trade worth around £800 million each year.

The port has suffered from its lack of deep-water access, in the face of increasing ship sizes. In 2010, it lost a contract with TransAtlantic UK for a thrice-weekly sailing to Sweden which regularly carried 400,000 tonnes (440,000 tons) per annum. The owners of Goole, ABP, retained the contract, but it was moved to the new 10-acre (4 ha) terminal at Hull King George Dock. This also involved moving two of the mobile cranes from Aldam Dock to Hull King George Dock by barge, with reputedly only a 9.8-foot (3 m) clearance underneath Humber Bridge.

== Statistics ==
The list below, shows the tonnages either unloaded, loaded, or both unloaded and loaded goods in the Port of Goole. Statistics are given in five year intervals, until 2015, when they are displayed yearly.

Tonnages at the Port of Goole 1890 – 2021

- 1890 – 543,313 tonnes (598,900 tons)
- 1895 – 748,363 tonnes (824,929 tons)
- 1900 – N/A
- 1905 – 536,000 tonnes (591,000 tons)
- 1910 – 766,000 tonnes (844,000 tons)
- 1915 – 778,161 tonnes (857,776 tons)
- 1920 – 449,665 tonnes (495,671 tons)
- 1925 – 2,684,570 tonnes (2,959,230 tons)
- 1930 – 3,258,202 tonnes (3,591,553 tons)
- 1935 – N/A
- 1940 – N/A (Note: Trade through the port was curtailed because of the Second World War.)
- 1945 – 840,000 tonnes (930,000 tons) (Note: Trade through the port was curtailed because of the Second World War.)
- 1950 – 1,882,406 tonnes (2,074,997 tons)
- 1955 – 1,997,255 tonnes (2,201,597 tons)
- 1960 – 2,429,262 tonnes (2,677,803 tons)
- 1965 – 2,166,000 tonnes (2,388,000 tons)
- 1970 – 2,227,000 tonnes (2,455,000 tons)
- 1975 – 1,775,000 tonnes (1,957,000 tons)
- 1980 – 1,448,000 tonnes (1,596,000 tons)
- 1985 – 1,404,000 tonnes (1,548,000 tons)
- 1990 – 1,739,000 tonnes (1,917,000 tons)
- 1995 – 2,304,000 tonnes (2,540,000 tons)
- 2000 – 2,711,000 tonnes (2,988,000 tons)
- 2005 – 2,623,000 tonnes (2,891,000 tons)
- 2010 – 1,936,000 tonnes (2,134,000 tons)
- 2015 – 1,327,000 tonnes (1,463,000 tons)
- 2016 – 1,379,000 tonnes (1,520,000 tons)
- 2017 – 1,440,000 tonnes (1,590,000 tons)
- 2018 – 1,460,000 tonnes (1,610,000 tons)
- 2019 – 1,242,000 tonnes (1,369,000 tons)
- 2020 – 1,044,000 tonnes (1,151,000 tons)
- 2021 – 1,228,000 tonnes (1,354,000 tons)

A sample of the goods loaded and unloaded from 1964 and 1965 shows that the biggest imports were chemicals and chemical fertilisers, with coal being the biggest export from Goole. (Note: In fact, coal exports accounted for 90.25% of exports from Goole (1,528,961 tonnes (1,685,391 tons)) in comparison to all other commodities added together (165,727 tonnes (182,683 tons)).) Between 1971 and the late 1980s, Goole was an import point for Renault cars. One of the benefits of using Goole for offloading vehicles was its ability to maintain a constant water level, being fed by the Aire and Calder Navigation. This avoided the need for expensive linkspans connecting the shipping vessels with the dockside. However, as mentioned elsewhere, the lack of access for bigger ships killed off this trade. A survey in 1996 detailed that 60% of trade arrived at, or left Goole by road, 35% by water, and only 5% by rail.

=== Coal export ===
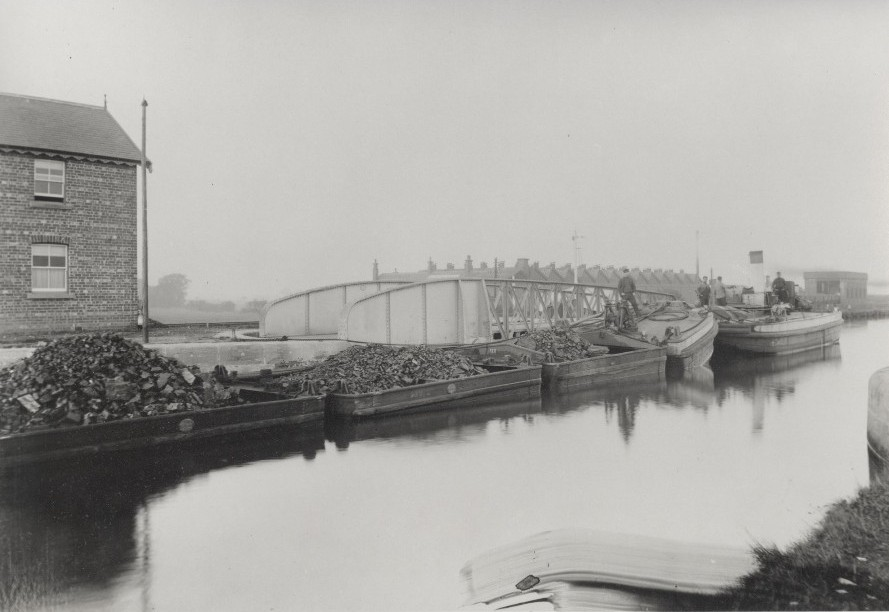
Tom Pudding train at Goole 1882

Coal was exported through Goole docks from the coalfields of West and South Yorkshire until 1986. The system used was a powered tug with several small coal barges pulled behind, with the coal-carrying barges being known as Tom Puddings. Each barge typically held between 35 tonnes (39 tons) and 40 tonnes (44 tons) of coal, and the trips were organised with up to 19 barges in the consist. This system had been developed by W. H. Bartholomew in an effort to stop the coal trade being monopolised by the railways, with the first hoist being opened in the late 1860s. Exports reached in peak in 1953, when over 2,448,000 tonnes (2,698,000 tons) of coal was exported, accounting for 94% of the tonnage through Goole docks. In 1976, between 230,000 tonnes (250,000 tons) and 250,000 tonnes (280,000 tons) of coal were exported through the docks via inland water transport on the Tom Pudding barges.

The coal trade brought in by Tom Pudding barges ceased in 1986.

Coal was also exported by rail, usually from Stanhope dock.

== Containerisation ==
The docks at Goole branched out into handling containers, most usually on short-sea services to other parts of the UK or Northern Europe. Containers were handled at Aldam Dock, and in 1984, £500,000 was spent on a new container facility. The peak year for the trans-shipment of containers came in 2001, when over 128,000 TEUs were handled at the dock. Since then, volumes have dropped, a decline attributed to larger ships for the container transport lines, which cannot access the port at Goole. A study in 2011, identified that of the Humber Ports (Goole, Grismby, Hull and Immingham), Goole only handled around 15% of the container trade, roughly 67,500 TEUs, although by 2012, it was only handling a 1,000 TEUs on average per year.

== Steamships ==
A liner service using steam ships was established at Goole in 1864 as the Goole Steam Shipping Company. This venture was backed by the Lancashire and Yorkshire Railway (successors to the Wakefield, Pontefract and Goole Railway who built the first railway into Goole), and the owners of the Aire and Calder Navigation. In 1905, the Lancashire and Yorkshire Railway, initiated a steamship service between Goole docks and the continent. With the grouping of the railways, between 1923 and 1948, these continued as part of the London, Midland and Scottish Railway, and then, after 1948, British Railways. In the 1950s, the steamships carried on being sponsored by the British Transport Commission, but operated by AHL (Associated Humber Lines). These sailings ceased in 1968 in the face of stiff competition from ro-ro ferries from elsewhere on the estuary.

== Docks ==
Goole Port diagram

The modern day port consists of eight docks and two dry docks. Boats can enter from the north-east via Victoria Lock and Ouse Lock, or via the south-east via Ocean Lock. The port has a complement of 20 berths with a maximum draft of 5.5 metres (18 ft). The length of vessels entering the dock cannot exceed 100 metres (330 ft). The draft is constant and not affected by the tides as water is supplied from the Aire and Calder Canal. Because the port was not planned as one system but constructed over a period of several decades, the layout makes ship movement difficult: a ship bound for the West Dock needs to make two ninety-degree turns if it enters through the Ouse Dock, or three if via the Ocean Lock. The acreage and opening dates of each dock are listed below:

- Aldam Dock – 2.5 acres (1 ha), 1882
- Barge Dock – 3.75 acres (1.52 ha), 20 July 1826
- Ouse Dock – 5 acres (2 ha), 1838
- Railway Dock – 4.5 acres (1.8 ha), 1846
- Ship Dock – 3.5 acres (1.4 ha), 20 July 1826
- South Dock – 5.5 acres (2.2 ha), 1910
- Stanhope Dock – 3.75 acres (1.52 ha), 1891
- West Dock – 7 acres (2.8 ha), 1912

The total length of quaysides is three miles (4.8 km). Additionally, storage space on the dock, both in warehouses and open storage, covers in excess of 480,000 square feet (45,000 m^{2}). The port has two dry docks, no. 1 being on the eastern side of the Ouse Dock and no. 2 being on the southern side of the South Dock. It historically had three, but No. 3 dry dock, which lay on the northern side of the Barge Dock, has been infilled and covered with warehousing. A proposed Central Dock, between the West and South Docks and reached from the latter, was never built.

== Listed buildings ==
Several buildings within the dock estate are listed with Historic England, most because of their association with the transportation of coal.

=== Ouse Lock and Victoria Lock ===
Ouse Lock was built between 1835 and 1838 and is built of stone. Nearby Victoria Lock was built in 1888 and is lined in blue engineering brick with rounded stone coping. Both have wrought iron capstans and timber gates. Each capstan is about 1 metre (3 ft 3 in) in height and consists of a tapering fluted column with a square base. Both locks are 15 metres (49 ft) in width, Ouse Lock is 105 metres (344 ft) in length, and Victoria Lock is 180 metres (590 ft) in length. The two are jointly grade II listed.

=== Dry Dock ===
The dry dock to the south of Ouse Lock was constructed between 1835 and 1841 and is grade II listed. It is built of stone, it has a rectangular plan with a tapering east end, and sides of 80 metres (260 ft) and 20 metres (66 ft), and it has a depth of 7 metres (23 ft). Apart from the west end, the sides are stepped, and at the west end is a hydraulic floating gate.

=== Boat Hoist ===
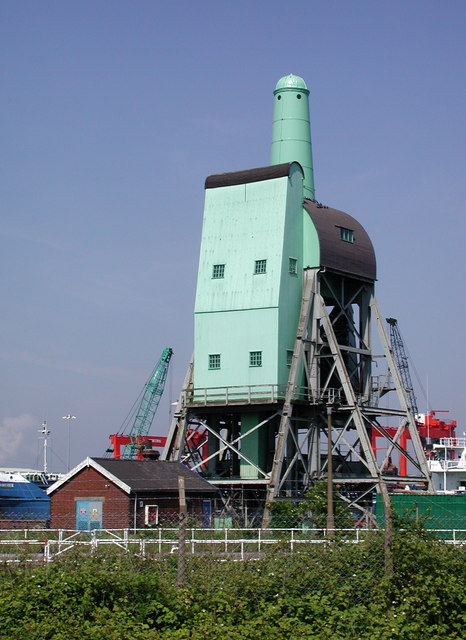
The boat hoist

The boat hoist is grade II* listed and was completed around 1862. It was constructed to transfer coal from canal barge coal compartments into seagoing vessels. It has a framework of cast iron girders on stone abutments, carrying weatherboarded cabins and a turret with asphalted roofs. There is a five-stage pyramidal tower with a semicircular roofed cabin on the top stage, surmounted by a tapering domed turret.

=== Hydraulic Accumulator Tower ===
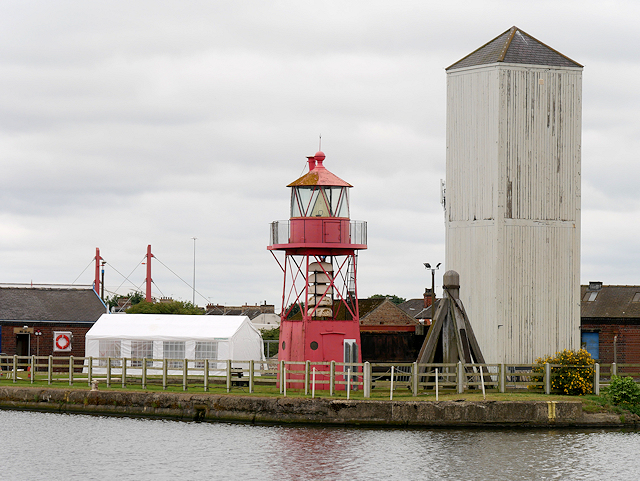
The hydraulic accumulator tower and nearby lighthouse

The hydraulic accumulator tower was built in the mid or late 19th century and it is grade II listed. It is timber framed with weatherboarding on a chamfered stone plinth, and has a hipped asphalt roof with a finial. The plain tower is about 15 metres (49 ft) in height with a square plan, and contains a horizontally-sliding sash window, and a fragmentary balcony. Inside, there is cast iron machinery.

=== Salt and Pepper Pots ===
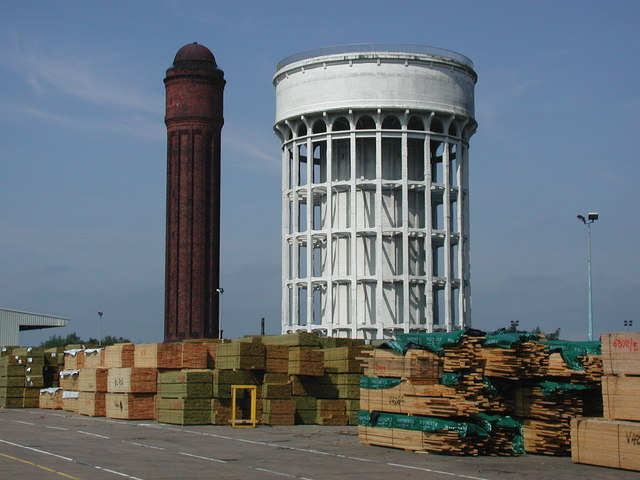
Salt and Pepper Pots

Two neighbouring water towers, each grade II listed, are known as the "Salt and Pepper Pots". The red brick tower was built around 1885 to hold 30,000 imperial gallons (140,000 L; 36,000 US gal). It consists of a three-stage cylindrical tower about 43 metres (141 ft) in height with a diameter of about 10 metres (33 ft). The bottom stage has a deep plinth with a stepped chamfered top, and contains a round-headed entrance with a chamfered top. The middle stage is a fluted shaft with recessed panels, and a corbelled cornice. The top stage is drum-shaped with a plinth, slit lights, a frieze, a moulded cornice and a blocking course. The water tank is in cast iron, and on the top is a sheet metal dome.

In 1927, a replacement tower was constructed of reinforced concrete, to hold 750,000 imperial gallons (3,400,000 L; 900,000 US gal). It is circular, with a diameter of 27.5 metres (90 ft) and a height of 44 metres (144 ft). There are eight stages, with a central seven-stage tower enclosed in an open framework, carrying a drum-shaped tank surmounted by a concrete balustrade. The tower has pilaster strips and bands between the stages, and the framework has a tall arched arcade of 24 closely set square piers.

=== Coal Wagon Hoist ===
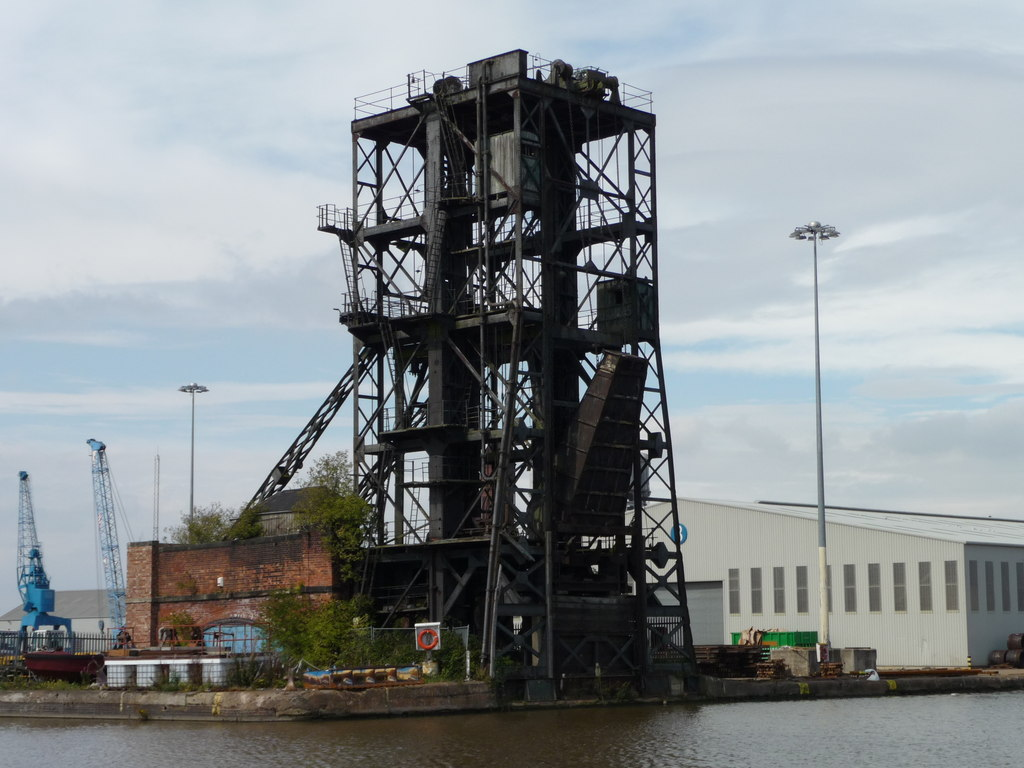
The Coal Wagon Hoist

The Coal Wagon Hoist was built in 1906. It raised a coal wagon and tilted it to tip its contents into a ship. It is in steel with wooden platforms, and consists of a five-storey tower with a central well of riveted lattice construction with a flat roof. On the west are angled girder buttresses. It was approached by a ramp from a railway viaduct in brick with stone dressings. One segmental arch of the viaduct has survived, and there is a timber control cabin with a hipped slate roof. The cabin has a doorway, a casement window, and two horizontally sliding sash windows. The hoist and associated railway structures are collectively grade II listed.

== See also ==
- Port of Hull
- Redcar Bulk Terminal
- Teesport
- Port of Whitby
