= Edward Banks (builder) =

English builder and civil engineer (1770–1835)

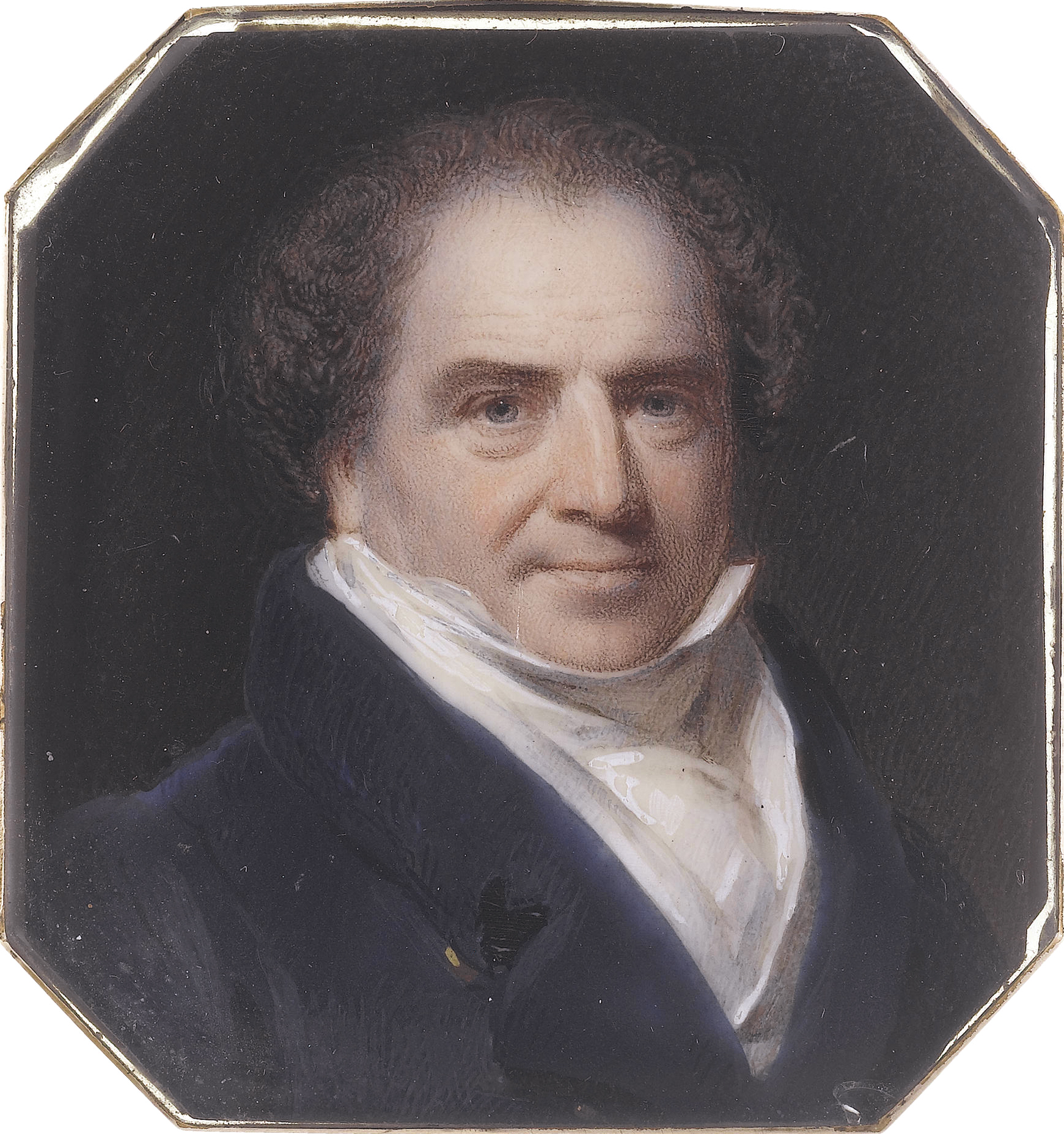
Sir Edward Banks (William Patten Junior)

Sir Edward Banks (4 January 1770 – 5 July 1835) was an English civil engineer and pioneer of steam ships.

== Early life and career ==
Born at Hutton Hang near Richmond, North Yorkshire. After spending two years at sea, Banks began as a day labourer in 1789. He worked under the engineer John Rennie the Elder on the Lancaster Canal and Ulverston Canal and rose to the chief control in his partnership Jolliffe & Banks, contractors for public works.

Banks and Jolliffe were responsible for building bridges, dockyards, lighthouses and prisons. Among his undertakings were Staines Bridge, the naval works at Sheerness dockyard, and the new channels for the rivers Ouse, Nene, and Witham in Norfolk and Lincolnshire. They were the builders of the Waterloo Bridge, Southwark Bridge, and London Bridge. He owed his fortune principally to these contracts, which he took under the nominal superintendence of the Rennies.

== Personal life ==
Edward Banks first married in 1793 to Nancy Franklin with whom he had five sons and three daughters. She died in 1815 and Banks married again in 1821 to Amalia Pytches, William John Joliffe's sister in law. Banks lived in Adelphi Terrace, Westminster. He also owned rural estates centred on Oxney Court, Dover and Sheppey Court, Kent. With William Joliffe, Banks was also an investor in the General Steam Navigation Company in 1824.

=== Death ===
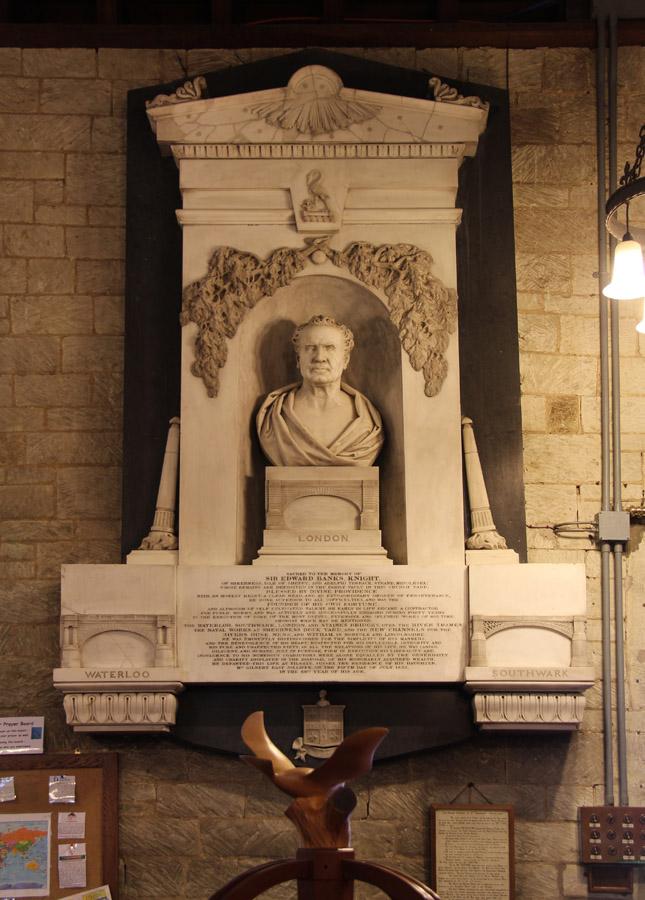
Monument to Banks in St Margaret's church, Chipstead

In June 1822 Banks was knighted for building the Waterloo and Southwark bridges. He died at Tilgate, Sussex, the residence of his daughter, Mrs. Gilbert East Jolliffe, on 5 July 1835. The story that whilst working as a day labourer upon the early 19th century Merstham tram-road, he had been struck with the beauty of the neighbouring small village of Chipstead, choosing to be buried there for that reason in its quiet churchyard, is a myth as suggested by oral tradition; Lewis Topographical Dictionary says he chose it as the Jolliffe family were patrons of that church, in-law relations and his business associates.
