= Goole =

Town and civil parish in the East Riding of Yorkshire, England

Coordinates: 53°42′17″N 0°52′29″W

- Town and Civil Parish
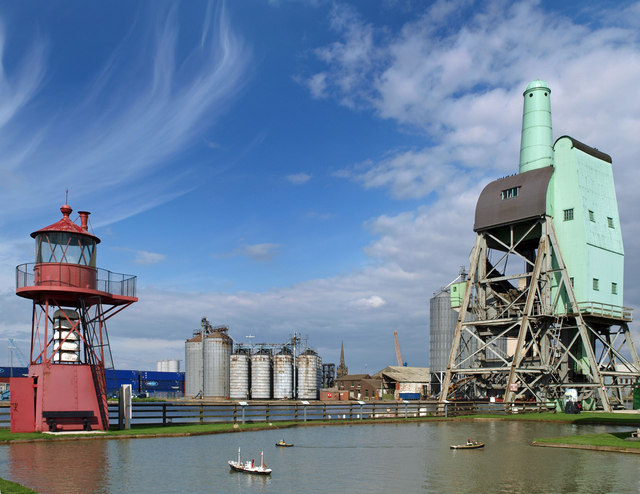
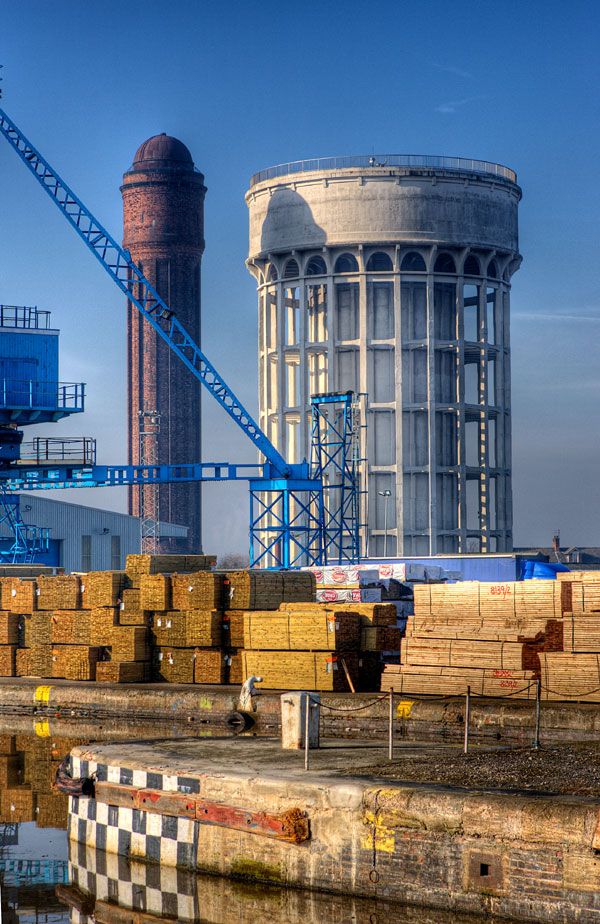
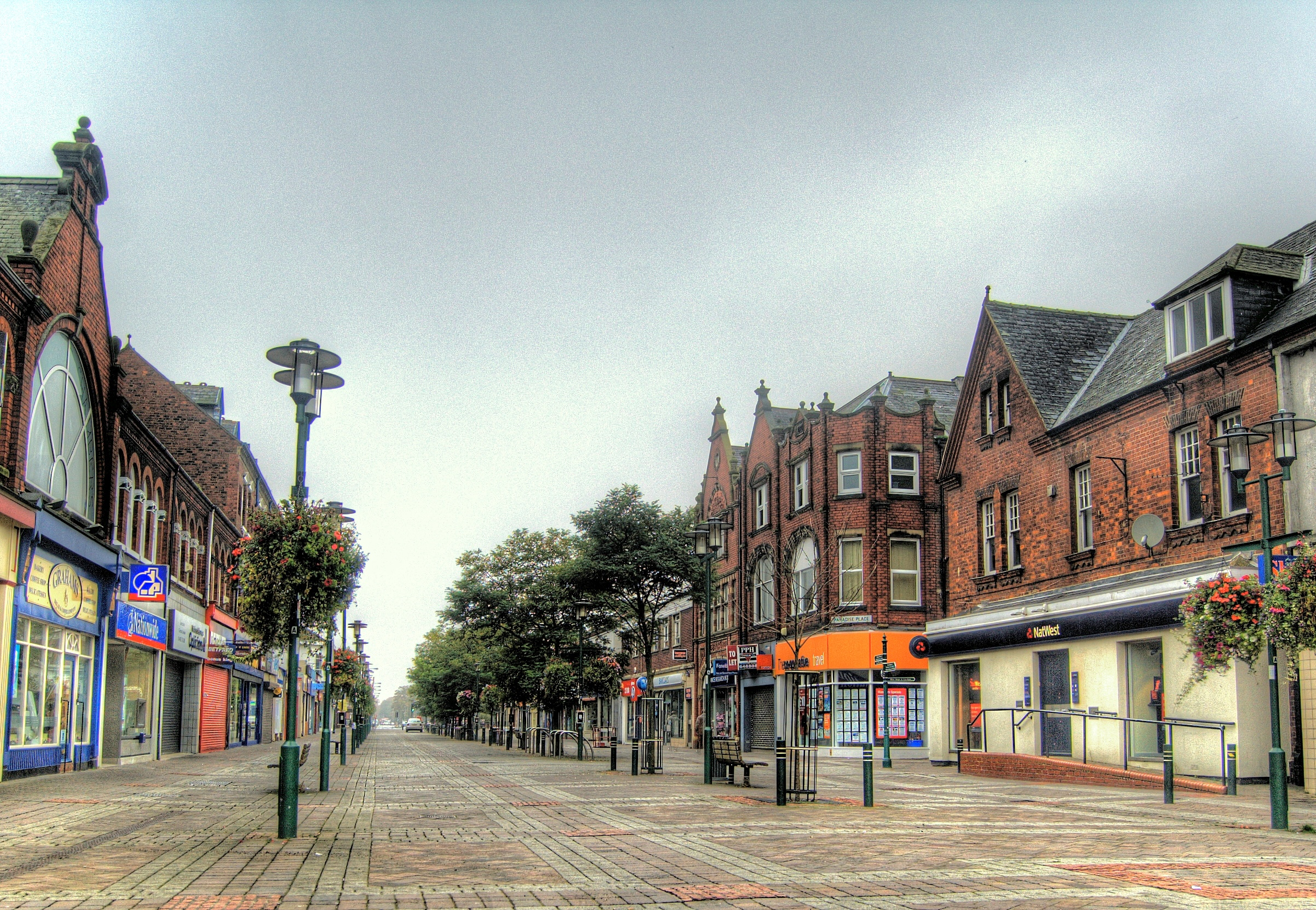
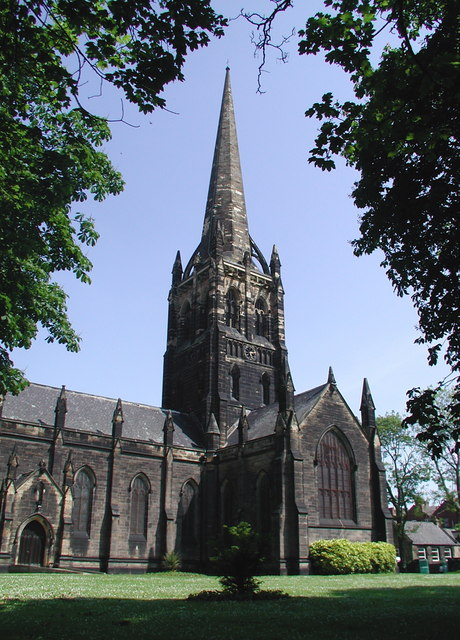
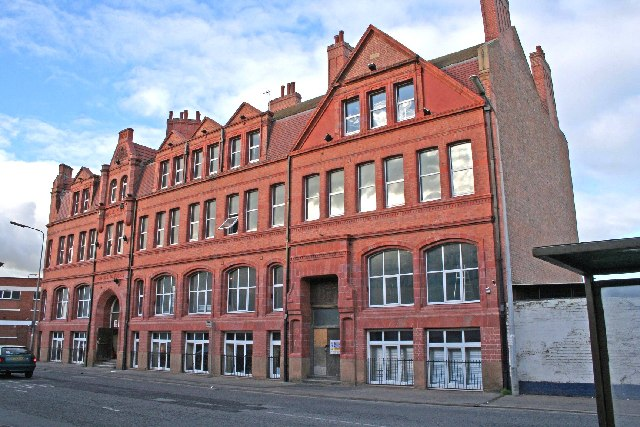
- Tom Pudding Boat Hoist The Port The Town Centre St John's Old L&YR Building

- Location within the East Riding of Yorkshire
- Population: 21,246 (2021 Census)
- OS grid reference: SE746231
- Civil parish: Goole
- Unitary authority: East Riding of Yorkshire
- Ceremonial county: East Riding of Yorkshire
- Region: Yorkshire and the Humber
- Country: England
- Sovereign state: United Kingdom
- Post town: GOOLE
- Postcode district: DN14
- Dialling code: 01405
- Police: Humberside
- Fire: Humberside
- Ambulance: Yorkshire
- UK Parliament: Goole and Pocklington

Goole is a port town and civil parish on the River Ouse in the East Riding of Yorkshire, England. The town's historic county is the West Riding of Yorkshire.

At the 2021 UK census, Goole parish had a population of 21,246. It is 16 miles (26 km) north-east of Doncaster, 19 miles (31 km) south of York and 29 miles (47 km) west of Hull.

The town has the United Kingdom's furthest inland port, being about 50 miles (80 km) from the North Sea. It is capable of handling nearly 2 million tonnes of cargo per year, making it one of the most important ports on England's east coast.

Goole is twinned with Złotów in Poland. Goole was informally twinned with Gibraltar in the 1960s; at that time, Gibraltar Court was named in Goole and Goole Court was named in Gibraltar.

== History ==
=== Etymology ===
Goole is first attested in 1306, as Gull Lewth (where lewth means 'barn', from Old Norse hlaða), and then 1362 as Gulle in Houke' (referring to the nearby, and then more significant, village of Hook). The name is first attested in its shorter, modern form, from the 1530s. It comes from the Middle English word goule (or an Old English ancestor), meaning 'a channel made by a stream'. The word has sometimes been taken to imply that Goole is named after an open sewer, but there is no strong basis for this. There were no sewers in the area in that etymological period but there were many land drains because of the flat terrain: cf.: "gully".

=== Background ===
The Dutch civil engineer Cornelius Vermuyden diverted the River Don northwards to the River Ouse in 1626–1629 in order to drain the marshland of Hatfield Chase at the behest of King Charles I. It made the new lower Don – known as the Dutch River – navigable for barges so that coal from the South Yorkshire Coalfield could be transported to the new confluence for transfer to seagoing vessels. There the engineers built a new wooden bridge – rebuilt in iron in the 1890s and now known as the Dutch River Bridge – to the east of which a new village called 'Goole' formed.

=== Development ===
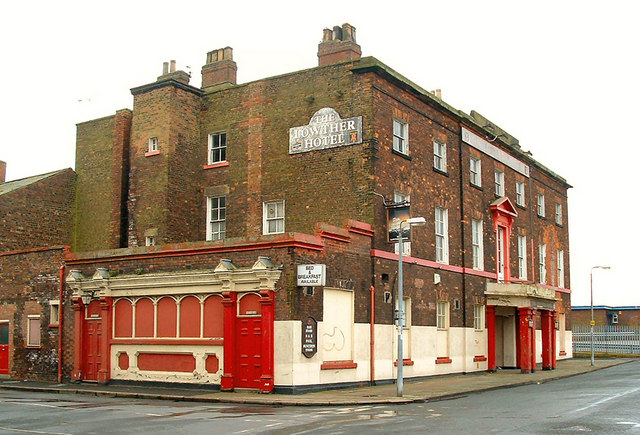
The Lowther Hotel, reputedly the first building constructed in New Goole in 1824, opened as the Banks Arms Hotel, named after Sir Edward Banks a contractor for the Aire and Calder Navigation company.

In the 1820s the Aire and Calder Navigation company proposed development of a new canal to transport coal from the existing broad canal from Knottingley in the northern sector of the coalfield in 1826. Once it reached Goole the company proposed development of a new floating dock capable of handling larger sea-going vessels. Chief engineer Thomas Hamond Bartholomew was instructed to build the canal, docks and an associated company town to house both the dock workers and visiting seamen. Bartholomew commissioned civil engineer and builder Sir Edward Banks company to construct part of the canal and the eight transshipment docks and to lay out the associated new town to the west of the existing wooden bridge. The Banks Arms Hotel on Aire Street – today known as the Lowther Hotel – was in 1824 the first building constructed in what was known as New Goole; The Macintosh Arms public house on the same street took its name from engineer Hugh Macintosh.

When Goole port opened on 20 July 1826 it was a new community of about 450 people. Now it is a 200 year old town with about 18,000 inhabitants.

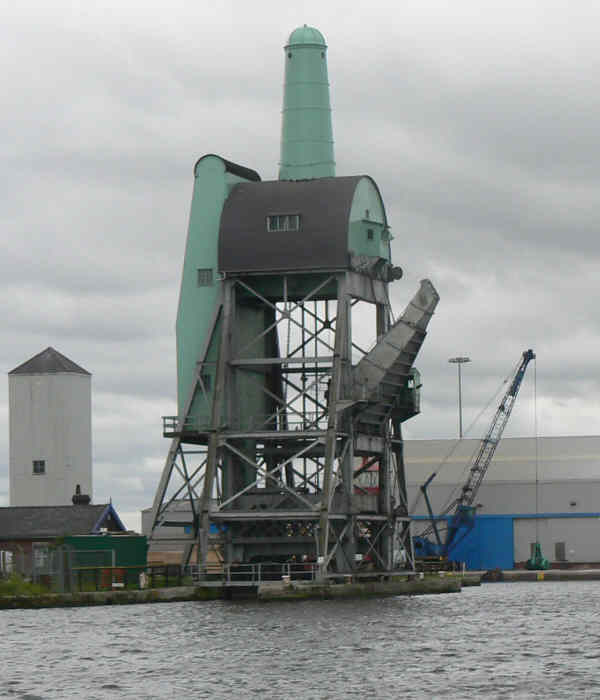
A Tom Pudding hoist in Goole docks

William Hamond Bartholomew succeeded his father T. H. Bartholomew in 1853 and in 1863 introduced the Tom Pudding system of compartment boats, which could carry around 40 long tons (41,000 kg) of coal. On reaching the docks the barges were lifted by large hoists, from which they could be discharged direct into seagoing ships, a system so successful that it competed against rail until 1985.

== Education ==
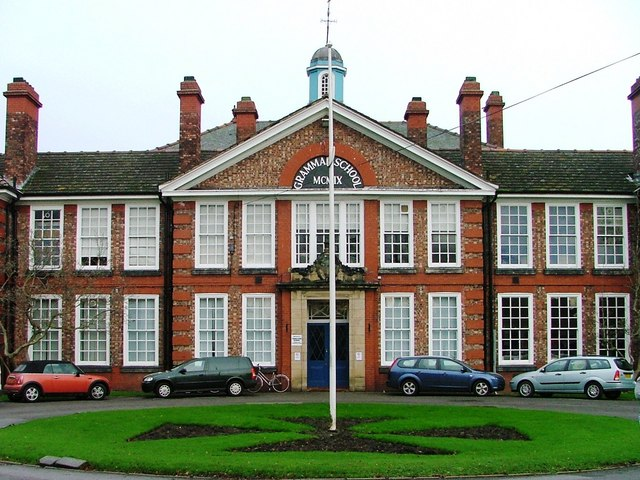
Goole High School, formerly Goole Grammar School

Goole has several primary schools as well as Goole High School, and a special education school, Riverside School, that caters for 2–19 year olds. There are further education colleges in Selby, York, Scunthorpe, and Bishop Burton. Goole College was closed in 2021 and is now being used as a temporary Gym while Goole Leisure Centre is redeveloped.

== Transport ==
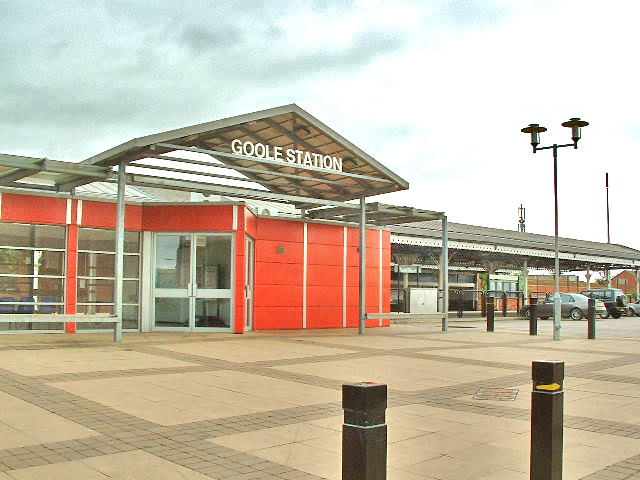
Goole railway station

The Lancashire and Yorkshire Railway built a line from Pontefract and Wakefield in 1848 and the North Eastern Railway connected the port with Doncaster and Hull in 1870. The prosperity from the coal and general cargo trade with the West Riding industrial area continued for 150 years after the opening of the canal.

Today Goole railway station is at the junction of the Hull and Doncaster Branch and the Pontefract Line. Services are provided to Hull Paragon Interchange, Doncaster, Sheffield, Leeds and the commuter stations in between.

Goole is south of the M62 linking it with Kingston upon Hull in the east and Leeds and the West Yorkshire urban belt in the west. To the north the A63 road via Howden provides local access to the A19 road to Selby and York. The M18 runs west of the town, connecting it with South Yorkshire, the South and the Midlands. Bus services to surrounding towns and villages are provided by East Yorkshire Motor Services, Stagecoach in Hull and Arriva Yorkshire.

== Governance ==
Before the reform of local government in 1974, brought about by the Local Government Act 1972, Goole was in the West Riding of Yorkshire. It was then placed in the Boothferry district of the county of Humberside until that was abolished in 1996. Since 1996 Goole has been in the East Riding of Yorkshire. It is represented by four councillors on the East Riding of Yorkshire Council.

Goole is in the parliamentary constituency of Goole and Pocklington, which has been represented in the House of Commons since 2024 by David Davis, a Conservative.

== Landmarks ==
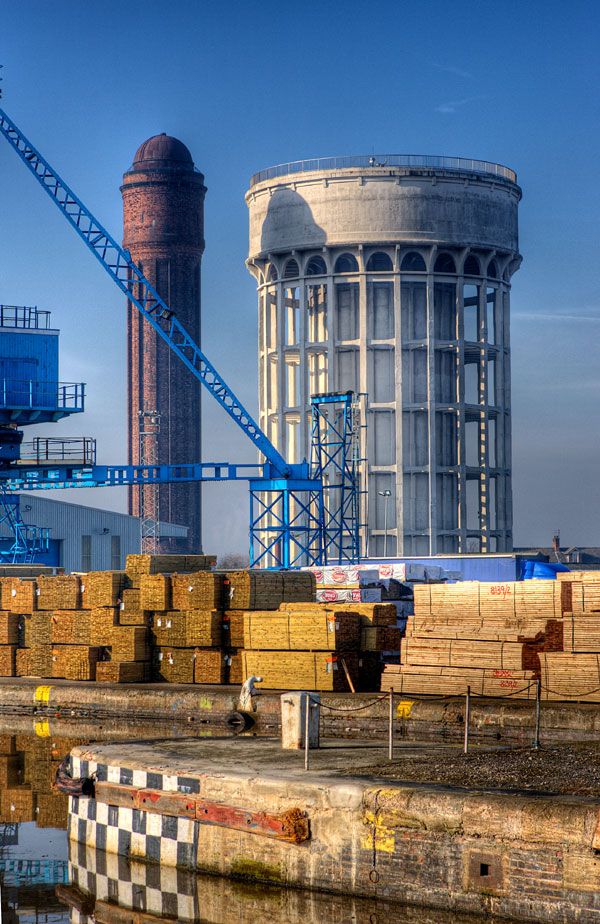
The twin water towers, 'salt' and 'pepper'

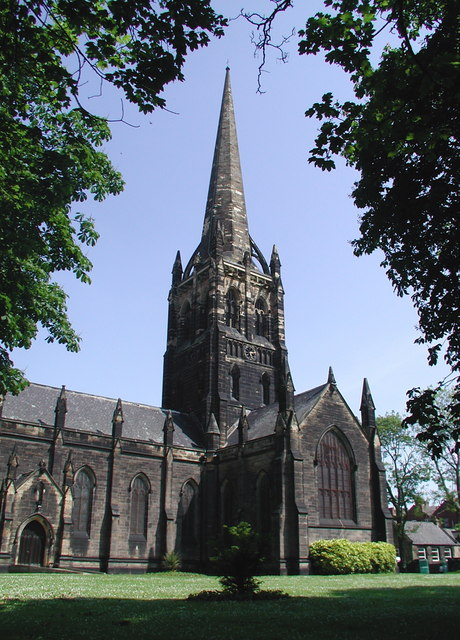
St John's Church, Gothic Revival style, built between 1843 and 1848.

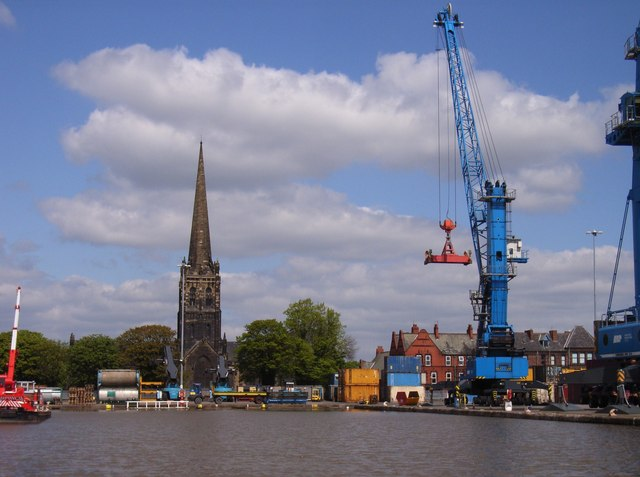
Goole Docks

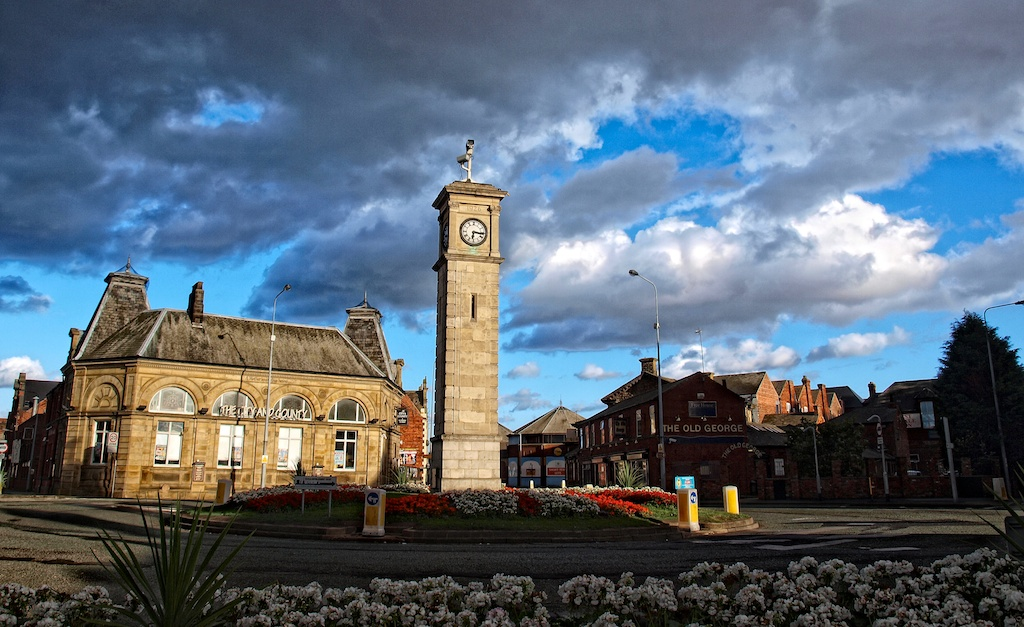
Goole's Clock Tower

Goole's most prominent landmarks are its twin water towers, nicknamed 'salt' and 'pepper'. The new white water-tower was the largest in Europe at the time of construction. In the winter months Goole's gas holder on Anderson Road is visible across the north of the town. The townscape is made up mostly of utility and industrial structures: many of the hoists and cranes on the dockside can be seen across the town. The steeple of Goole Parish Church is tall enough to be seen across the town. There is a clock tower in the main shopping district of the town, originally built in 1927 but later moved a few metres to the middle of a new roundabout with the road surface on the site of the former open-air marketplace. West Park is an Edwardian park in the town.

== Economy ==
Goole has a modestly-sized town centre with many high street shops, independent retailers and public houses. The main shopping area is Wesley Square, off Boothferry Road (which has been pedestrianised around the main shopping area). There is a modern retail development in the town centre, a leisure centre next to the docks and the Goole and District Hospital, to the north of the town. A theatre and cinema, 'Junction', opened in 2009.

== Industry ==
Glass is produced in Goole, which is also the centre of an agricultural district. The town's former large employer was a clothing manufacture for the big multiples, but it closed in the late 2000s.

=== Manufacturing ===
Goole's industrial park, Capitol Park / Goole36, has attracted two large employers: Guardian Industries, which built a glass-manufacturing plant, and Tesco, which built a distribution centre. The arrival of these employers resulted in the creation of hundreds of new jobs. A new railway rolling stock factory was built at the Capitol Park / Goole36 location opening in 2024. The plant, owned and operated by Siemens Mobility, is currently building the new tube trains for the Piccadilly line in London.

A new Metsä Tissue toilet roll factory was announced 21 September 2023, to be built over the next decade at the new Goole site within the Humber Freeport, which allows companies to import goods tariff-free. When completed it will have a capacity to produce 240,000 tonnes (260,000 tons) of tissue paper using fresh wood fibres grown in Nordic forests.

=== Docks ===
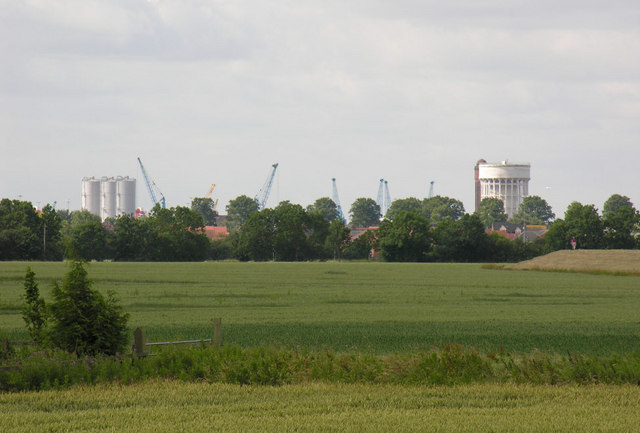
The port, from a distance

Three locks keep the water in 37 acres (150,000 m^{2}) of floating docks at a constant depth of 6 metres (20 ft) by preventing the level from rising and falling with the tides in the River Ouse. Once ships are within the complex, eight docks provide a total quayside of 3 miles (4.8 km). Beside the docks are transit sheds where cargo is stored, many of them equipped with overhead cranes. Unlike many ports, every one of the eight docks has been in full commercial operation since its construction in the period from 1826 to 1912.

For most of its life, the port was most associated with the shipment of coal and associated cargoes, including the importation of pit props. With the demise of mining, the former Timber Pond became a marina, trading under the name Goole Boathouse. It has berths for 150 boats.

After a period of decline, commodities were replaced by containers, the export of steel and the import of timber from north-eastern Europe. Today, the Port of Goole has regular cargo liner services to Norway, Sweden, Finland, Germany, the Netherlands, Belgium, France, Spain, Morocco and South Africa and a transshipment route to Europort, Rotterdam.

== Sport ==
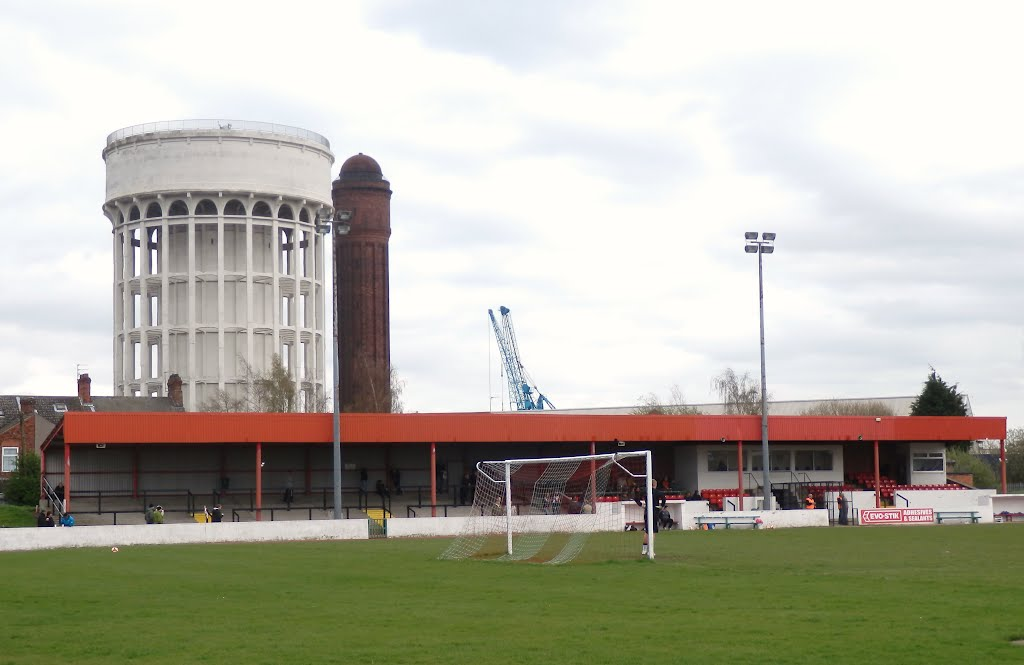
Victoria Pleasure Ground

Goole Town Cricket Club supports local cricket teams. Of its three teams, the first team plays in the club cricket York & District Senior League. A new clubhouse was constructed in 1996 providing facilities and a bar.

Rugby Union is played close to the cricket club at Westfield Banks, sharing facilities with Goole Tennis Club and Goole Viking Striders running club. Goole RUFC currently fields two teams, the first team playing in Yorkshire Division Two.

In 2025, Goole Vikings rugby league club joined League 1.

Goole Tennis Centre is a nine-court tennis club on the Westfield Banks site.

Goole has two football teams – Goole A.F.C. and Goole United A.F.C. They currently play in the Northern Premier League Division One South and the Humber Premier League Division One respectively. They both play at the Victoria Pleasure Grounds on Marcus Street. The nearest professional teams are: Rotherham United, Doncaster Rovers, Grimsby Town, Hull City, Leeds United, Barnsley, Scunthorpe United, Sheffield Wednesday, Sheffield United and York City.

Goole used to have two golf clubs. The early course, founded in 1900, was at Rawcliffe Park. The later course was at Airmyn Park from 1911 to the Second World War. Currently Goole's nearest golf clubs are the Boothferry Golf Club in Spaldington and Drax Golf Club in Drax.

== Media ==
Television signals are received from either the Emley Moor or Belmont TV transmitters. However, on Sky and Freesat, residents in the town are allocated BBC One Yorkshire and ITV Yorkshire West.

Local radio stations are BBC Radio Humberside, Nation Radio East Yorkshire, Greatest Hits Radio Yorkshire, Capital Yorkshire and Radio Medica is a not-for-profit radio station broadcast from the Goole And District Hospital.

The town is served by a weekly tabloid newspaper, The Goole Times, published since 1853 and sold in Goole and neighbouring parts of the East Riding of Yorkshire.

The town is referenced by the play An Inspector Calls, where the main character is named after the town of Goole.

== Notable people ==
- Nigel Adams, former Member of Parliament for Selby and Ainsty, born in Goole Hospital.
- John Billington, stage actor (1828–1904), born in Goole.
- Gavin Bryars, composer and double bassist, born in Goole.
- Sir Roy Clarke, comedy writer, lives in Goole.
- Noel Duckworth, was an Olympic rower and Anglican priest, Canon of Accra and the first Chaplain of Churchill College.
- Betty, Hazel and Julie Dunderdale, who performed professionally as The Dale Sisters, a vocal trio that had limited chart success in the early 1960s.
- Nicky Featherstone, professional footballer for Hartlepool United F.C., born in Goole.
- Anne Greaves (1889–1971) was the first woman to become a member of the Institute of Quarrying and created artificial stone through her quarrying company
- Jimmy Mann, footballer, born in Goole.
- Sandra's Wedding, a four-piece alternative rock band from Goole.
- Ian Smith, comedian, born in Goole.

== See also ==
- Listed buildings in Goole

== Gallery ==
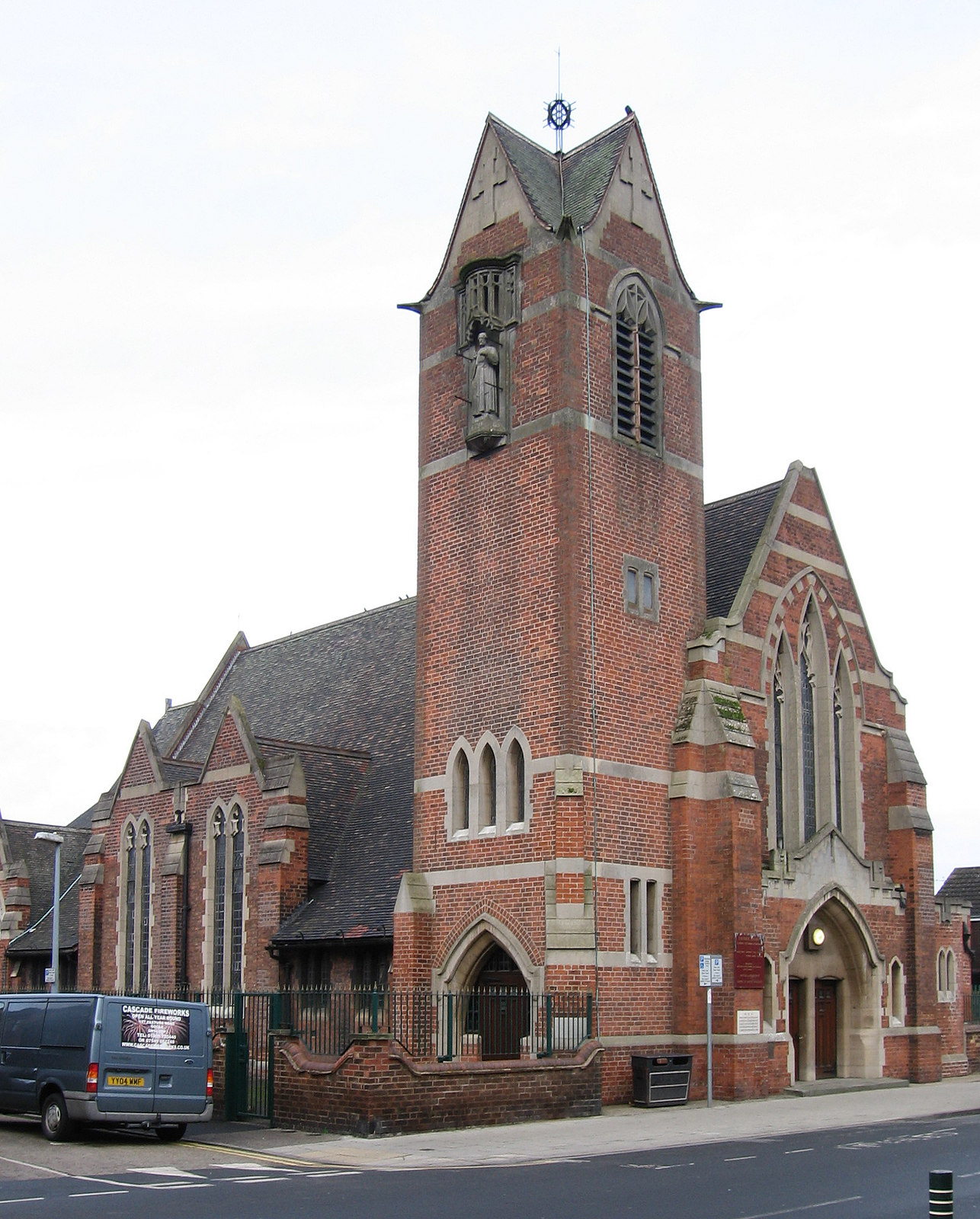
St Joseph's Catholic Church

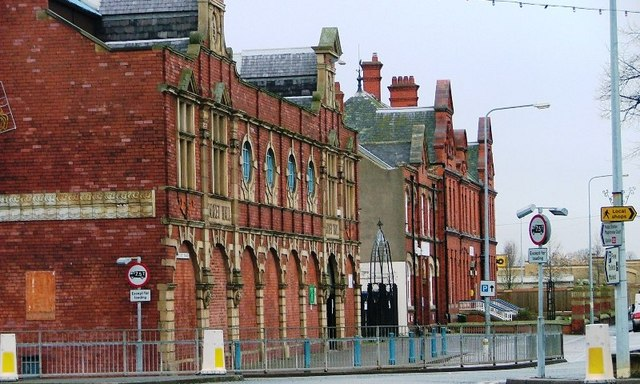
Market Hall
