= Canal ring =

Looping series of canals

A canal ring is a series of canals that make a complete loop.

== Etymology ==
There have been canals which formed a ring for more than 200 years, but the term was unknown before the 1960s, when the Inland Waterways Association coined Cheshire Ring as part of its campaign to save the Ashton Canal and Peak Forest Canal from closure.

Working boatmen were concerned with getting from one place to another as fast as possible, or for the lowest toll, rather than in visiting more of the system, and what are now known as rings were simply alternative routes to them, but circular routes allow leisure boaters to see twice as much of the system as is possible with an "out and back" cruise. Hire companies are keen to promote their proximity to popular cruising rings.

Since the Cheshire Ring was born, more rings (and variants of them) have been named. The best-known are those that can be completed in one or two weeks, although some three-week rings (such as the Outer Pennine Ring) have been given names, but there are many other unnamed rings.

== Notable rings ==
=== The Netherlands ===
- Ringvaart

=== England ===
See also Canals of Great Britain

- Avon Ring
  - River Avon, River Severn, Worcester and Birmingham Canal and Stratford-upon-Avon Canal. The ring is 108 miles (174 km) long, and includes 131 locks.
- Black country ring
  - Staffordshire and Worcestershire Canal, Trent and Mersey Canal, Coventry Canal (Isolated Section), Birmingham and Fazeley Canal, BCN Main Line. The ring is 68 miles (109 km) long, and includes 71 locks.
- Cheshire Ring
  - Rochdale Canal, Ashton Canal, Peak Forest Canal, Macclesfield Canal, Trent and Mersey Canal, Bridgewater Canal. The ring is 97 miles (156 km) long, and includes 92 locks.
- Droitwich Ring
  - Droitwich Barge Canal, Droitwich Junction Canal, Worcester and Birmingham Canal, River Severn. The ring is 21 miles (34 km) long, and includes 33 locks. It became a ring in 2011, when the Droitwich canals were reopened after they had been closed for 70 years.
- Four Counties Ring
  - Trent and Mersey Canal, Staffordshire and Worcestershire Canal, Shropshire Union Canal, Middlewich Branch, (Wardle Canal). The ring is 110 miles (180 km) long, and includes 94 locks.
- Leicestershire Ring
  - Trent and Mersey Canal, River Soar, Grand Union Canal, Oxford Canal, Coventry Canal, Birmingham and Fazeley Canal, Coventry Canal (isolated section)
- South Pennine Ring
  - Rochdale Canal, Calder and Hebble Navigation, Huddersfield Broad Canal, Huddersfield Narrow Canal, Ashton Canal. The ring is 73 miles (117 km) long, and includes 197 locks.
- North Pennine Ring
  - Rochdale Canal, Calder and Hebble Navigation, Aire and Calder Navigation, Leeds and Liverpool Canal, Bridgewater Canal
- Outer Pennine Ring (Combines the North and South Pennine rings, omitting the section of the Rochdale canal that they share)
  - Calder and Hebble Navigation, Aire and Calder Navigation, Leeds and Liverpool Canal, Bridgewater Canal, Rochdale Canal, Ashton Canal, Huddersfield Narrow Canal, Huddersfield Broad Canal
- Stourport Ring
  - River Severn, Staffordshire and Worcestershire Canal, Stourbridge Canal, Dudley Canals, Birmingham Canal Navigations (Netherton Tunnel Branch Canal and Birmingham New Main Line), Worcester and Birmingham Canal. The ring is 84 miles (135 km) long, and includes 116 locks.
- The Thames Ring / Great Ring
  - River Thames, Oxford Canal, Grand Union Canal. The ring is 245 miles (394 km) long, and includes 176 locks.
- Warwickshire ring
  - Coventry Canal, Oxford Canal, Grand Union Canal, Birmingham and Fazeley Canal. The ring is 104 miles (167 km) long, and includes 121 locks.

Incompletely navigable:

- Wessex Ring
  - River Thames, Kennet and Avon Canal, Wilts and Berks Canal

This ring is only possible when the Wilts and Berks Canal is fully restored.

- North Thames Ring
  - River Thames, Thames and Severn Canal, North Wilts Canal, Wilts and Berks Canal

This ring is only possible when the Thames and Severn Canal, North Wilts Canal and Wilts and Berks Canal are fully restored.

- Cotswolds Ring
  - Thames and Severn Canal, Stroudwater Navigation, Gloucester and Sharpness Canal, River Severn, River Avon (Warwickshire), Stratford-upon-Avon Canal, Grand Union Canal, Oxford Canal, River Thames

This ring is only possible when the Thames and Severn Canal and the Stroudwater Navigation are fully restored.

- Severn Ring
  - Montgomery Canal, Llangollen Canal, Shropshire Union Canal, Staffordshire and Worcestershire Canal, River Severn

This ring is only possible when the Montgomery Canal and River Severn are fully restored.

- Yorkshire Ring (Currently incomplete)
  - Aire and Calder Navigation, Dearne and Dove Canal, Barnsley Canal, River Don Navigation, New Junction Canal

This ring is possible only when the Barnsley and Dearne and Dove Canals are fully restored.

== See also ==
- Canals of the United Kingdom
- History of the British canal system
