= Yorkshire Ring =

Canal ring in England

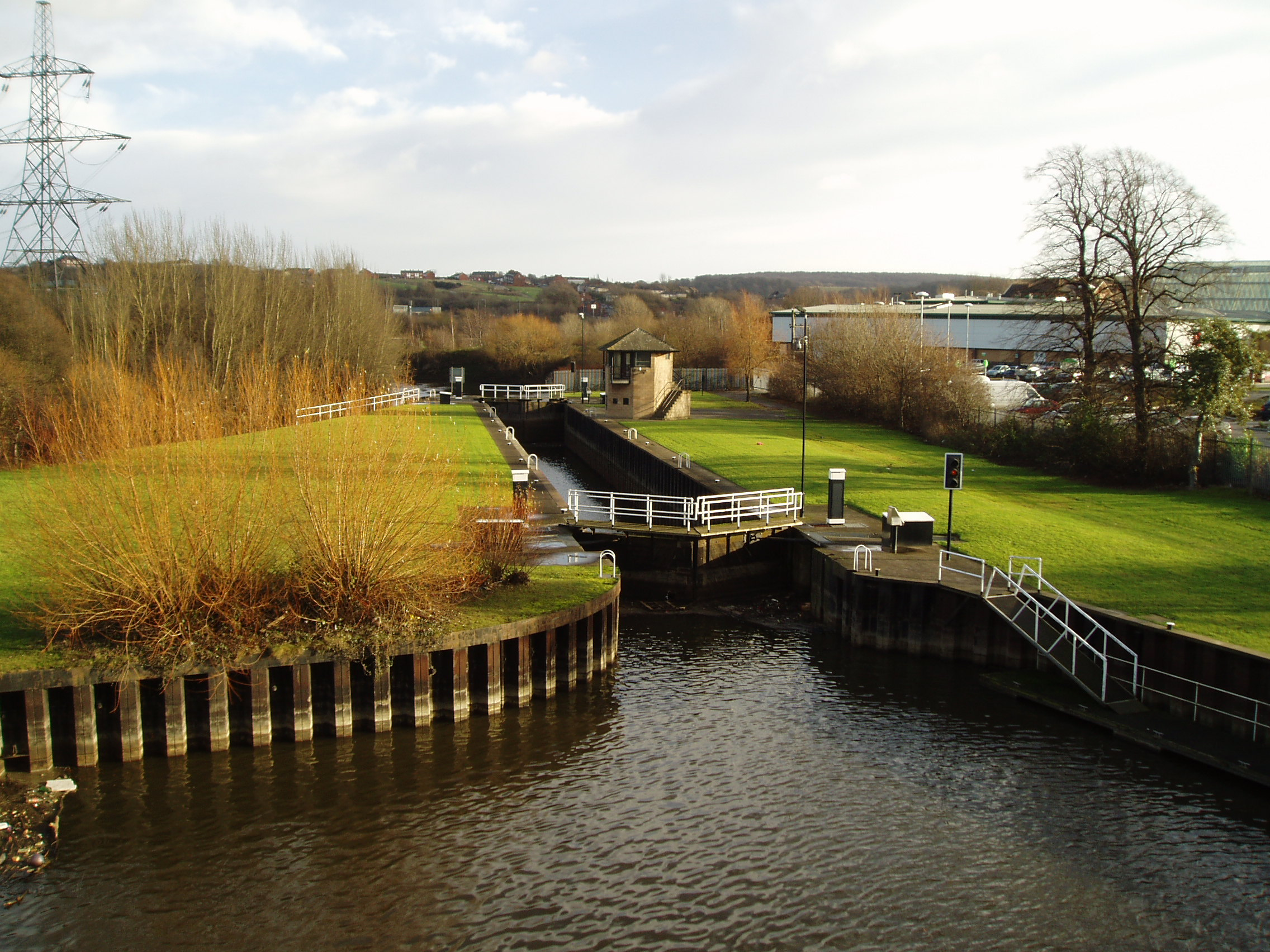
- Aldwarke Lock on the River Don was enlarged to take 700-tonne Eurobarges in 1983.
- Interactive map of Yorkshire Ring

Specifications
- Locks: 48
- Status: incomplete
- Navigation authority: Canal and River Trust

The Yorkshire Ring is a canal ring in South and West Yorkshire, England. It was completed in 1905 with the construction of the New Junction Canal. It lasted for under thirty years before the closure of part of the Dearne and Dove Canal and subsequently the complete Barnsley Canal. Both these canals are currently under restoration.

== Canal Rings ==
The concept of a canal ring was created in 1965, as part of a campaign by the Inland Waterways Association to prevent the complete closure of the Rochdale Canal. Initially the canal was described as part of the "Cheshire Canal Ring", which was soon shortened to the "Cheshire Ring". It described a series of interconnecting canals which could be navigated, usually in a week or two, without having to cover any section twice, and has subsequently been applied to several other such routes.

The Yorkshire Ring is the result of a similar campaign. The Barnsley Canal Group was formed in 1984, initially with the intention of attempting to secure the restoration of the Barnsley Canal from the Aire and Calder Navigation near Wakefield to the town of Barnsley. As the group developed, the attraction of the canal being part of a through route came to be appreciated, and in 1986 they considered whether the Dearne and Dove Canal could also be restored. There were extra problems with restoring this canal, because significant parts of it had been destroyed by development since its closure, but the Great Central Railway line from Mexborough to Barnsley was abandoned at around this time, and offered a route for the construction of new sections of the canal to replace those that could not be restored. Thus the idea of restoring both waterways, and the idea of the Yorkshire Ring as a way of promoting this was born.

== Timeline ==
1793
The possibility of a complete ring is realised when the Barnsley Canal and the Dearne & Dove Canal are both authorised by Acts of Parliament passed on the same day.
1804
The Dearne and Dove Canal is completed, five years after the Barnsley Canal. Only a short section of the ring remains to be constructed between the Stainforth and Keadby Canal and the Aire and Calder Navigation.
1888
The Sheffield and South Yorkshire Navigation Company is created, and eventually succeeds in taking over control of the River Don Navigation, Stainforth and Keadby Canal, Dearne and Dove Canal and the Sheffield Canal from the Manchester, Sheffield and Lincolnshire Railway Company in 1895.
1891
The Aire and Calder Canal company obtain an Act of Parliament to authorise construction of the New Junction Canal. However, the project was to be jointly funded and owned by the newly formed Sheffield and South Yorkshire Navigation, and could not start until they had obtained their waterways from the railway company. The construction did not therefore start until after 1 March 1895.
1905
The New Junction Canal is completed thus also completing the Yorkshire Ring.
1934
The ring is broken again by the closure of the central section of the Dearne and Dove Canal, as a result of problems caused by mining subsidence.
1953
The Barnsley Canal is officially closed
1961
The Dearne and Dove Canal is also closed
1984
There is possibility of the complete ring being resurrected by the Barnsley Canal Group which has been formed with the intention of restoring the Barnsley and Dearne & Dove Canals.

== Points of interest ==
| Point | Coordinates (Links to map resources) | OS Grid Ref | Notes |
|---|---|---|---|
| New Junction joins Aire and Calder | 53.6611°N 1.0157°W | SE651187 | |
| New Junction joins River Don Navigation | 53.5902°N 1.0755°W | SE612107 | |
| River Don Navigation in Doncaster | 53.5258°N 1.1411°W | SE570035 | |
| Bottom locks of Dearne and Dove | 53.4849°N 1.3023°W | SK463989 | |
| Dearne and Dove joins Barnsley Canal | 53.5569°N 1.4639°W | SE356068 | |
| Barnsley Canal joins Aire and Calder | 53.6753°N 1.4727°W | SE349200 | |
| Aire and Calder Castleford Junction | 53.7317°N 1.3586°W | SE424263 | |
| Aire and Calder at Ferrybridge | 53.7148°N 1.2684°W | SE483245 | |

== See also ==
- Canals of the United Kingdom
- History of the British canal system

== Bibliography ==
- Bullock, David (1991). "Dearne and Dove Canal - the vital link" (PDF). Barnsley Canal Group.
- Hadfield, Charles (1972). The Canals of Yorkshire and North East England (Vol 1). David and Charles. ISBN 978-0-7153-5719-4.
- Hadfield, Charles (1973). The Canals of Yorkshire and North East England (Vol 2). David and Charles. ISBN 978-0-7153-5975-4.
- McKnight, Hugh (1981). The Shell Book of Inland Waterways. David and Charles. ISBN 978-0-7153-8239-4.
- Nicholson (2006). Nicholson Waterways Guide (Vol 6): Nottingham, York and the North East. Harper Collins. ISBN 978-0-00-721114-2.
- Shead, Jim (March 2004). "The Cheshire Ring". Waterways World. ISSN 0309-1422.
