= Adwick =

Adwick may refer to:

- Adwick le Street, village north of Doncaster in South Yorkshire, England
- Adwick railway station serves the communities of Adwick-le-Street and Carcroft, near Doncaster in South Yorkshire, England
- Adwick upon Dearne, village west of Doncaster in South Yorkshire, England

== See also ==
- Aldwick
