= Listed buildings in Adwick upon Dearne =

Adwick upon Dearne is a civil parish in the metropolitan borough of Doncaster, South Yorkshire, England. The parish contains seven listed buildings that are recorded in the National Heritage List for England. Of these, one is listed at Grade II*, the middle of the three grades, and the others are at Grade II, the lowest grade. The parish contains the village of Adwick upon Dearne and the surrounding countryside. The listed buildings consist of a church, a cross base in the churchyard, a dovecote, two bridges, and a farmhouse.

== Key ==
Grade	Criteria
II*	Particularly important buildings of more than special interest
II	Buildings of national importance and special interest

== Buildings ==
Name and location	Photograph	Date	Notes	Grade
St John's Church; 53.50806°N 1.29246°W		12th century	The church was later altered and extended, and the vestry was added and the chancel arch replaced in 1910. It is built in pebbledashed sandstone with a Welsh slate roof, and has retained some Norman features, including the round-arched south doorway. The church consists of a nave, a south porch, and a chancel with a north vestry. At the west end is a wide buttress carrying a gabled double bellcote. The east window has two lights, and contains Y-tracery.	II*
Cross base 53.50795°N 1.29259°W	—	Medieval	The cross base is in the churchyard of St John's Church. It is in sandstone and consists of a square block with a moulded edge and a socket.	II
Dovecote northwest of Addsetts Cottage; 53.51069°N 1.29323°W	—	Early 18th century	The dovecote is in sandstone, with quoins, and a Welsh slate roof with gable copings and shaped kneelers. There are two storeys and one bay. In the ground floor is a doorway with a massive surround and a slit vent, and the upper floor contains a similar doorway with a hood mould, and a casement window. In the left return is a two-light mullioned window.	II
Bolton Mill Bridge; 53.51047°N 1.30966°W	—	Mid 18th century	The bridge, which was widened in about 1800, carries Hound Hill Lane (B6098 road) over Hound Hill Dyke. It is in sandstone, and consists of a single rusticated segmental arch. The flanking piers are in the form of cutwaters, and have angled tops. There is a projecting keystone, and the parapets have rounded copings. The abutment walls are splayed and have end piers, and all the bridge is linked by a cambered inscribed band.	II
Tithe Barn Cottage; 53.51010°N 1.29388°W	—	Late 18th century	A sandstone farmhouse on a plinth, with quoins, and a pantile roof with gable copings and shaped kneelers. There are two storeys, two bays, and a continuous rear outshut with an extension to the right. The central doorway has a quoined surround and a deep lintel, and the windows are casements with lintels grooved as voussoirs.	II
Adwick Bridge; 53.51461°N 1.28637°W		c. 1800	The bridge carries Harlington Road over the River Dearne. It is in sandstone, and consists of two segmental arches. The bridge rises to the centre, and has a band and a coped parapet. The middle pier has angled cutwaters, and the wing walls are angled and have end piers.	II
Poplar Farmhouse; 53.50950°N 1.29232°W	—	Early 19th century	The farmhouse is in sandstone, with quoins, and a Welsh slate roof with gable copings and shaped kneelers. There are three storeys, three bays, a rear wing, and a lower extension on the right. The middle bay projects under a pediment with a circular plaque in the tympanum. In the centre is a porch, and a doorway with a pulvinated frieze and cornice. The ground floor windows are casements, and the upper floors are sash windows.	II
