= Dearne =

Dearne may refer to:

- River Dearne, a river in South Yorkshire, England
- Dearne Valley, an urban area in South Yorkshire, England; formerly known as Dearne Urban District
