= River Dove, Barnsley =

River in South Yorkshire, England

River Dove, South Yorkshire
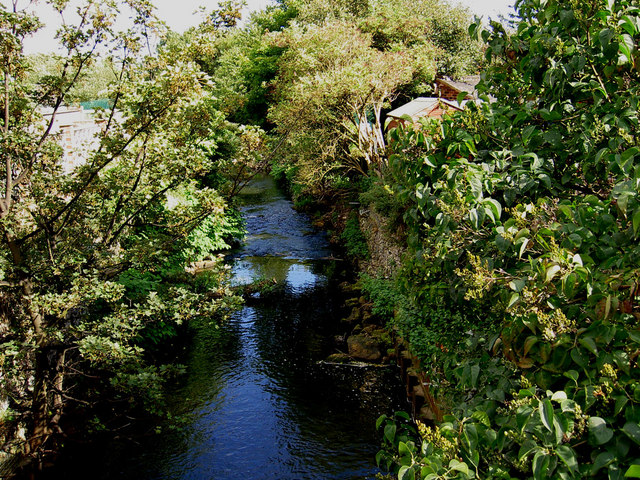
- River Dove on the outskirts of Darfield

Location
- Country: England
- County: South Yorkshire; Yorkshire (historical)

Physical characteristics
- Source
  - location: Worsbrough Reservoir
  - coordinates: 53°31′34″N 1°28′27″W
  - elevation: 184 feet (56 m)
- Mouth
  - location: River Dearne nr Darfield
  - coordinates: 53°31′43″N 1°22′9″W
- Length: 4.92 mi (7.92 km)

The River Dove is a river that extends through the Low Valley in Barnsley, England. It flows from Worsbrough Reservoir to its confluence with the River Dearne.

== Course ==
The River Dove starts at the outfall of Worsbrough Reservoir, which was built for the opening of the Dearne and Dove Canal in 1804. It supplied the Worsbrough section of the canal as well as the river. It is fed by a number of streams, the main ones being the Brough Green Brook and the Rockley Dike. Rockley Dike rises to the north of Thurgoland, close to the 660-foot (200 m) contour, and heads east. The upper reaches are called Crane Moor Dike on the Ordnance Survey map. Near Rockley Abbey Farm, it is joined by another branch which rises near Tankersley and runs parallel to the M1 motorway. The combined flow passes under the motorway to enter the southern end of the reservoir. These have a total length of 6.3 miles (10.1 km) and a catchment area of 6.51 square miles (16.9 km^{2}).

The northern tributary is called Dodworth Dike by the Environment Agency. It consists of four main streams, two of which rise near Silkstone Common and Berry Moor. They join near a disused railway embankment, and are joined by the Bagger Wood Dike, further to the east. The Dove Valley Trail, a long-distance footpath, runs along the northernmost railway embankment, having left the Trans Pennine Trail to the south west of Silkstone Common. The combined streams are known as Stainborough Dike, and are in turn joined by Dodworth Dike, which flows southwards from its source in Dodworth. It then becomes the Brough Green Brook, flows under the motorway, and enters the reservoir. This system has a total length of 8.64 miles (13.90 km) and a catchment area of 6.43 square miles (16.7 km^{2}).

After its construction, Worsbrough Reservoir was extended in 1826. The shareholders of the Dearne and Dove Canal had wanted to build a completely new reservoir near Wentworth Castle, on the Stainborough Dike, but the House of Lords committee imposed certain conditions on the scheme, and the company withdrew the bill rather than accept the conditions. Instead the engineer George Leather suggested raising the water level of the existing reservoir by 4.5 feet (1.4 m), and this was carried out. It increased the surface area by 20 acres (8.1 ha). Although the Worsbrough Branch of the canal was closed to traffic in 1906, due to subsidence from coal mining, the reservoir continued to serve its function, as the closed branch was still used as a water feeder for the main canal. In order to comply with the Reservoirs Safety Act, two new spillways were constructed in 1984.

At the foot of the dam is the Worsbrough Corn Mill. A mill has been in the vicinity since at least 1086, but the present mill dates from 1625. A mill house was added in the mid-1700s, and the mill was modified in the 1820s. A steam-powered mill was added in the 1840s, but it ceased to operate in the early 20th century, although the water-powered mill remained in use until the 1960s, grinding animal feedstuffs. When West Riding County Council began turning it into a museum in 1972, they installed a Hornsby hot-bulb engine from Sykehouse windmill to replace the steam engine, which had been scrapped in 1922. It passed to South Yorkshire County Council in 1974, and opened to the public in 1976. It is now the responsibility of Barnsley Council, and is a Grade II* listed building. Nearby is a Grade II listed single span bridge, dating from 1809.

Almost immediately after leaving the reservoir, the River Dove is crossed by the A61 road at Worsbrough Bridge. Below it, the river runs close to Worsbrough Basin, part of the closed Dearne and Dove Canal. There was a footbridge across the river near the basin, but it was washed away by the floods of 2007. In 2016 the bridge was replaced by a new steel bridge, at a significantly higher level, which provides pedestrian access to Woolley Bank Wood. It was funded by Barnsley Council, the Dearne Valley Landscape Partnership, Worsbrough Councillors and some Section 106 money.

Below the basin, the Blacker Dike, which rises near Birdwell, joins from the south, and then Station Road crosses on a bridge. The station which gave the road its name was Wombwell Central railway station, which was on the South Yorkshire Railway line between Barnsley and Mexborough. It closed in 1959. There are then a series of railway bridges. Swaithe Bridge is the first, while the next three were part of a complex railway junction, but all the tracks have been removed.

The A633 Barnsley Road crosses at Aldham Bridge, which is followed by another unused railway bridge. Next Stonyford Bridge carries the B6096 road over the river, and Wombwell Ings, an area of low-lying ground and lakes, is located to the south. Wombwell Ings is used as a washland, which is flooded in a controlled way when the river is unable to discharge into the Dearne because of high water levels, which are themselves often the result of high levels in the River Don. They were engineered to act as washlands in 1973, as part of the River Dearne Improvement Scheme. A little further on, the river joins the River Dearne. The total length of this section, including the Blacker Dike, is 7.2 miles (11.6 km) and it has catchment area of 9.73 square miles (25.2 km^{2}).

== Water quality ==
The water quality of the river and its tributaries is variable. The Environment Agency measure water quality of the river systems in England. Each is given an overall ecological status, which may be one of five levels: high, good, moderate, poor and bad. There are several components that are used to determine this, including biological status, which looks at the quantity and varieties of invertebrates, angiosperms and fish. Chemical status, which compares the concentrations of various chemicals against known safe concentrations, is rated good or fail.

The water quality of the Dove was as follows in 2019.

Section	Ecological Status	Chemical Status	Overall Status	Length	Catchment
Rockley Dike from Source to River Dove	Moderate	Fail	6.3 miles (10.1 km)	6.51 square miles (16.9 km^{2})	heavily modified
Dodworth Dyke from Source to River Dove	Good	Fail	8.6 miles (13.8 km)	6.43 square miles (16.7 km^{2})	heavily modified
Dove from Source to River Dearne	Moderate	Fail	7.2 miles (11.6 km)	9.73 square miles (25.2 km^{2})	heavily modified

The water quality has improved since 2009, when the main river had a poor ecological status, and the overall status was also poor. Like most rivers in the UK, the chemical status changed from good to fail in 2019, due to the presence of polybrominated diphenyl ethers (PBDE), perfluorooctane sulphonate (PFOS) and mercury compounds, none of which had previously been included in the assessment.

== Points of interest ==
Point	Coordinates (Links to map resources)	OS Grid Ref	Notes
Source of Brough Green Brook	53.5140°N 1.5708°W	SE285020	
Source of Rockley Dike	53.5114°N 1.5601°W	SE292017	
Outflow from Worsbrough Reservoir	53.5262°N 1.4750°W	SE349034	
Swaithe railway bridge	53.5288°N 1.4375°W	SE373037	
A633 Aldham Bridge Wombwell	53.5349°N 1.4182°W	SE386044	
B6096 Stoneyford Bridge	53.5290°N 1.3883°W	SE406037	
Junction with River Dearne	53.5289°N 1.3689°W	SE419037	mouth

== Bibliography ==
- Butt, R. V. J. (October 1995). The Directory of Railway Stations: details every public and private passenger station, halt, platform and stopping place, past and present (1st ed.). Sparkford: Patrick Stephens Ltd. ISBN 978-1-85260-508-7. OCLC 60251199. OL 11956311M.
- Firth, Christopher (1997). Domesday to the dawn of the New Millennium - 900 years of the Don fishery (PDF). Environment Agency. Archived from the original on 17 July 2019. (This is available online at The Don Catchment Rivers Trust. Page numbers refer to the pdf file).
- Hadfield, Charles (1973). The Canals of Yorkshire and North East England (Vol 2). David and Charles. ISBN 0-7153-5975-4.

== Sources ==
- "Barnsley". Environment Agency. Archived from the original on 14 March 2012.
- Map of River Dove in Barnsley, Streetmap
