= Avon Ring =

Canal ring in England

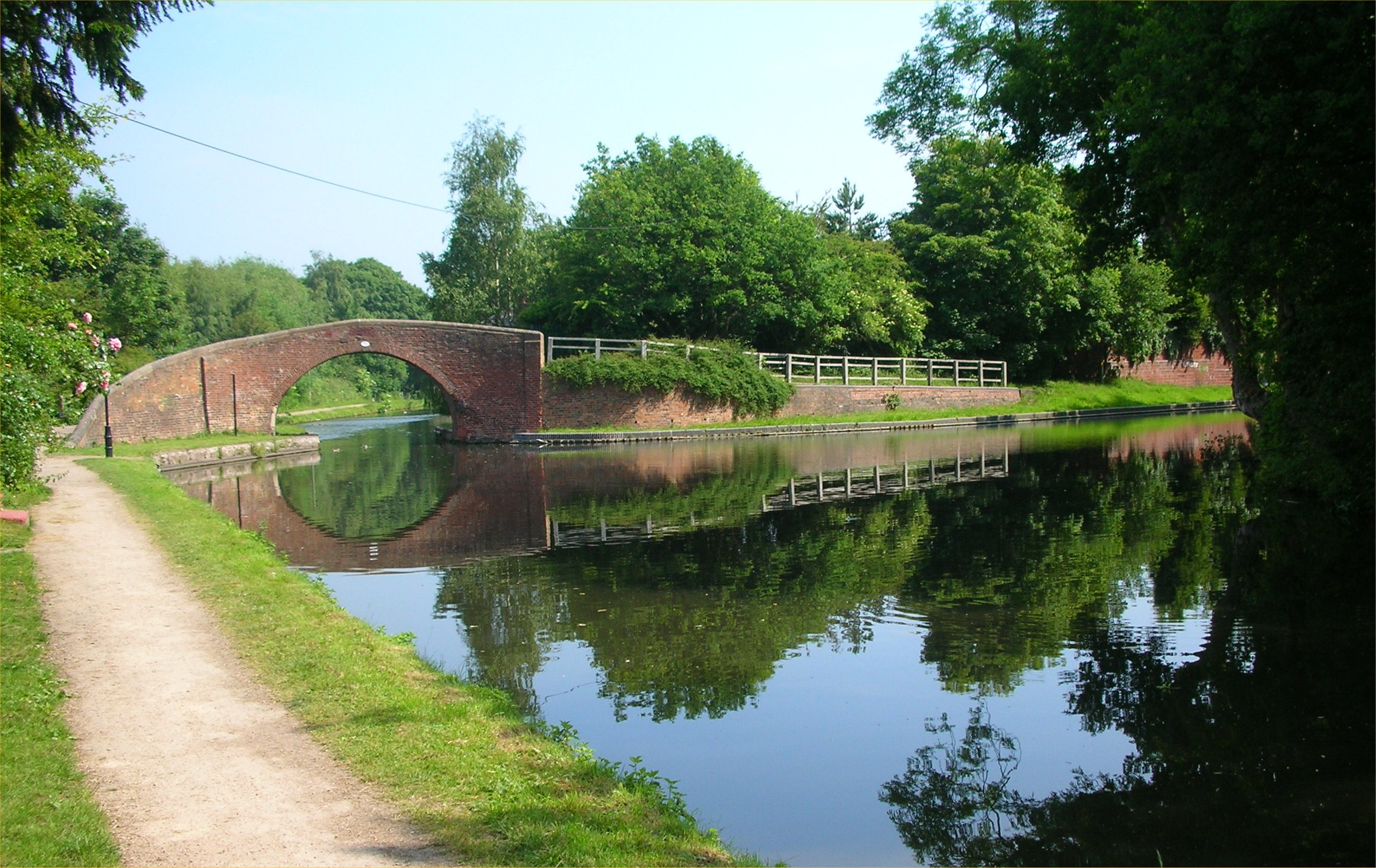
- Kings Norton Junction and roving bridge over the Worcester and Birmingham Canal. The start of the Stratford-upon-Avon Canal is at the top right.

Specifications
- Length: 109 miles (175 km)
- Locks: 129
- Status: Canal ring
- Navigation authority: Canal & River Trust & Avon Navigation Trust

The Avon Ring is a canal ring which is located to the south west of Birmingham in England, and connects the major towns of Stratford-upon-Avon, Evesham, Tewkesbury, Worcester and the southern outskirts of Birmingham. It consists of stretches of four waterways, and is heavily locked, with a total of 129 locks on its route of 109 miles (175 km).

== The route ==
The concept of a canal ring is a recent one, having been coined in 1965 to describe routes which could be used by people boating for leisure, that did not require holiday makers to return to their start location by the same route as they had used to reach their destination. The constituent waterways of the Avon Ring, which can take about two weeks to navigate are:

- River Avon
- River Severn
- Worcester and Birmingham Canal
- Stratford-on-Avon Canal

Starting from Stratford-upon-Avon, and travelling in a clockwise direction, the Avon Ring follows the downstream course of the River Avon through Evesham to arrive at Tewkesbury, where the river joins the River Severn. There are 17 locks on this 42.2-mile (67.9 km) section, ten before Evesham and seven afterwards. The River Avon is a navigation, and so each lock is accompanied by a weir, to maintain the flow of the river.

From Tewkesbury, the ring follows the upstream course of the River Severn for 16 miles (26 km) to Worcester. This is the longest level section, as the only lock is located at Diglis, just before the junction with the Worcester and Birmingham Canal.

From the junction with the River Severn, there are two locks to reach Diglis Basin, and then another eight as the canal leaves Worcester. The Offerton flight of six locks follows, just before the canal passes under the M5 motorway, after which the 230 yd (210 m) Dunhampstead tunnel is encountered. A junction with the Droitwich Canal, which was restored to navigation in 2011, is followed by the six locks of the Astwood flight, another six at Stoke, and almost immediately, the thirty locks of the Tardebigge flight, which raise the level of the canal by 217 ft (66 m). The top lock of the flight brings to 58 the number of locks worked in just 15.5 miles (24.9 km), as the final section is level. Two short tunnels follow; Tardebigge tunnel is 580 yd (530 m) long and Shortwood tunnel is 613 yd (561 m) long. The canal meanders across rural Worcestershire, passing under the M42 motorway just to the north of Alvechurch, before entering the Wast Hills Tunnel. The tunnel is 2,726 yd (2,493 m) long, and its northern portal is in Warwickshire, in the urban outskirts of Birmingham. Within a mile, Kings Norton Junction is reached, where the Stratford-upon-Avon Canal begins, and the 24.5-mile (39.4 km) journey up the Worcester and Birmingham Canal ends.

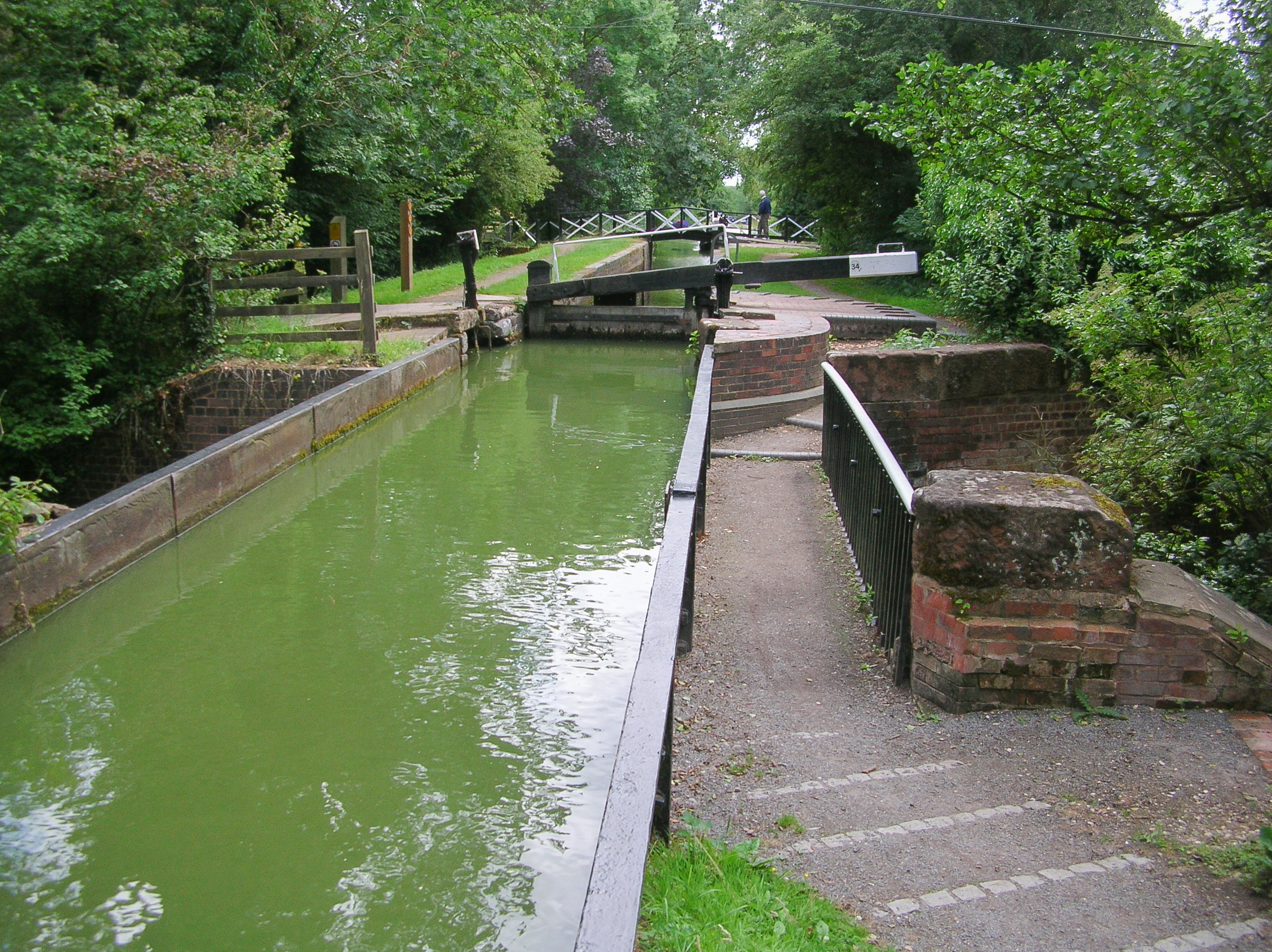
Yarningdale aqueduct on the Stratford-upon-Avon Canal

The start of the Stratford-upon-Avon canal is marked by a guillotine lock, which used to prevent water passing between the canals, but is now maintained in an open position. The first eleven miles (18 km) is level, with a five-mile (8 km) urban section containing the 352 yd (322 m) Brandwood tunnel, and a six-mile (9.6 km) rural section which passes under the M42 motorway. The 26 locks of the Lapwood flight start the descent towards Stratford-upon-Avon, with the final one in the shadow of the M40 motorway bridge. The Lapworth Link turns off near locks 20 and 21, to connect with the Grand Union Canal. Only one of these two locks needs to be negotiated, as they are on parallel routes. Another 27 locks complete the journey to Stratford-upon-Avon, with eleven of them concentrated in the Wilmcote flight. The length of the canal is 25.5 miles (41.0 km), and officially contains 54 locks, although only 52 of them have to be negotiated.

== Points of interest ==
Point	Coordinates (Links to map resources)	OS Grid Ref	Notes
Kings Norton Junction	52.4123°N 1.9228°W	SP053793	
Kingswood Junction, Stratford-on-Avon Canal	52.3352°N 1.7277°W	SP186708	
Junction with R Avon, Stratford-on-Avon	52.1913°N 1.7022°W	SP204548	
River Avon at Bidford-on-Avon	52.1639°N 1.8566°W	SP099517	
River Avon at Evesham	52.0864°N 1.9519°W	SP033431	
River Avon joins River Severn	51.9964°N 2.1637°W	SO888331	
Diglis Lock, River Severn	52.1780°N 2.2249°W	SO847533	
Worcester & Birmingham at Worcester	52.1974°N 2.2154°W	SO853554	
Bottom of Tardebigge flight	52.3100°N 2.0545°W	SO963679	
South portal of Wast Hills Tunnel	52.3809°N 1.9487°W	SP035758	

== See also ==
- Canals of the United Kingdom
- History of the British canal system

== Bibliography ==
- Cumberlidge, Jane (2009). Inland Waterways of Great Britain (8th Ed.). Imray Laurie Norie and Wilson. ISBN 978-1-84623-010-3.
- Nicholson (2006). Nicholson Guides (Vol 2) Severn, Avon & Birmingham. Harper Collins Publishers. ISBN 0-00-721110-4.
- Shead, Jim (March 2004). "The Cheshire Ring". Waterways World. ISSN 0309-1422. Archived from the original on 3 March 2016.
