= Stourport Ring =

- Map of the Ring

Specifications
- Length: 74 miles (119 km)
- Locks: 105
- Status: Canal ring
- Navigation authority: Canal & River Trust

The Stourport Ring is a connected series of canals forming a circuit, or canal ring, around Worcestershire, The Black Country and Birmingham in The Midlands, England. The ring is formed from the River Severn, the Staffordshire and Worcestershire Canal, the Stourbridge Canal, the Dudley Canals, the Birmingham Canal Navigations (Netherton Tunnel Branch Canal and Birmingham New Main Line) and the Worcester and Birmingham Canal.

The ring is 74 miles and includes 105 locks including 3 electrically operated river locks, 2 pairs of staircase locks and 2 broad locks. The route includes flights of locks at Tardebigge (×30), Stourbridge (×16) and the Black Delph at Brierley Hill (×8). The route also includes two of the longest navigable tunnels on the UK network, these being the Netherton and Wast Hills Tunnels.

The ring has an alternative longer route via Wolverhampton of 83 miles and 122 locks and does not include the Stourbridge or Dudley canals. This route uses the connection between the Staffordshire and Worcestershire Canal, and the BCN Main Line at Aldersley Junction.

The ring is popular for cruising and has a number of narrowboat hire centres on the route including Alvechurch, Viking Afloat (Worcester), Anglo-Welsh (Tardebigge), Brook Line (Dunhampstead) and Black Prince (Stoke Prior).

Whittington Lock on the S&W Canal

Popular visitor attractions on or close to the Stourport Ring include Cadbury World, The Black Country Living Museum, the Severn Valley Railway, Kinver Edge, the Birmingham Jewellery Quarter, Brindleyplace plus the Merry Hill, Bullring and Mailbox shopping centres.

Popular overnight mooring places on the ring include Worcester city centre, Stourport Basin, Wolverley, Kinver, Merry Hill, Windmill End, The Black Country Museum (via short detour), Gas Street Basin, Hopwood, Stoke Works and Dunhampstead.

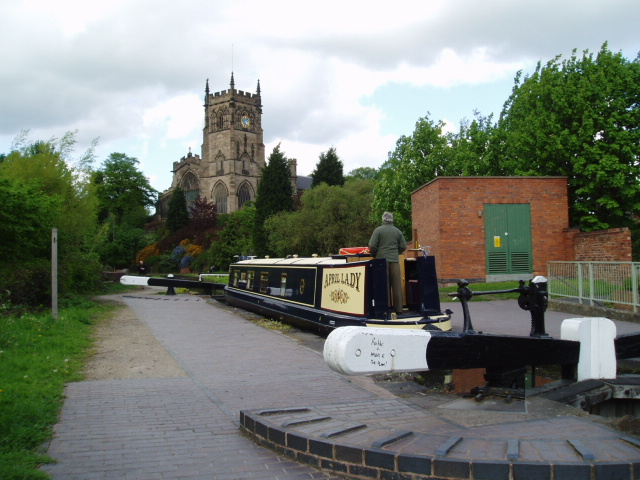
Kidderminster Lock on the S&W Canal

== List of all locks on the ring with their map references ==
Based on travelling clockwise and starting at Worcester. Excludes the northern extension.

Lock Number	Waterway	Lock Name	Coordinates	OS Grid Ref
1	River Severn	Bevere Lock	52.2333°N 2.2407°W	SO835593
2		Holt Lock		SO820634
3		Lincomb Lock	52.3216°N 2.2646°W	SO821693
4/5	Staffordshire and Worcestershire Canal	Stourport basin lower staircase		SO809710
6/7		Stourport basin upper staircase		SO809710
8		Stourport York Street Lock 3	52.3386°N 2.2787°W	SO811712
9		Falling Sands Lock 4	52.3674°N 2.2548°W	SO827744
10		Caldwell Lock 5	52.3783°N 2.2548°W	SO827756
11		Kidderminster Lock 6		SO829768
12		Wolverley Court Lock 7	52.4031°N 2.2524°W	SO829784
13		Wolverley Lock 8	52.4102°N 2.2497°W	SO830791
14		Debdale Lock 9		SO839801
15		Whittington Lock 10	52.4406°N 2.2171°W	SO853825
16		Kinver Lock 11		SO848834
17		Hyde Lock 12		SO848834
18		Stewponey Lock 13	52.4616°N 2.2059°W	SO850842
19	Stourbridge Canal	Stourton Bottom Lock	52.4636°N 2.2047°W	SO861851
20		Stourton Lock		SO862851
21		Stourton Lock		SO864852
22		Stourton Top Lock	52.4646°N 2.1990°W	SO865852
23		Stourbridge Bottom Lock 16	52.4728°N 2.1643°W	SO889861
24		Stourbridge Lock 15		SO890863
25		Stourbridge Lock 14		SO891863
26		Stourbridge Lock 13		SO892864
27		Stourbridge Lock 12		SO894865
28		Stourbridge Lock 11		SO895865
29		Stourbridge Lock 10		SO895865
30		Stourbridge Lock 9		SO896865
31		Stourbridge Lock 8		SO897866
32		Stourbridge Lock 7		SO897867
33		Stourbridge Lock 6		SO898867
34		Stourbridge Lock 5		SO899868
35		Stourbridge Lock 4		SO899868
36		Stourbridge Lock 3		SO900869
37		Stourbridge Lock 2		SO902871
38		Stourbridge Top Lock 1	52.4829°N 2.1436°W	SO903872
39	Dudley Canal Line No. 1	Delph Bottom Lock 8	52.4756°N 2.1230°W	SO917863
40		Delph Lock 7		SO917864
41		Delph Lock 6		SO918864
42		Delph Lock 5		SO918865
43		Delph Lock 4		SO918865
44		Delph Lock 3		SO919866
45		Delph Lock 2		SO920866
46		Delph Top Lock 1	52.4790°N 2.1184°W	SO920867
47		Blowers Green Lock*	52.4975°N 2.0979°W	SO934888
	Dudley Canal Line No. 2	(no locks)		
	Netherton Tunnel Branch Canal	(no locks)		
	Birmingham New Main Line	(no locks)		
48	Worcester and Birmingham Canal	Tardebigge Top Lock No 58*	52.3214°N 2.0107°W	SO993692
49		Tardebigge Lock No 57		SO987689
50		Tardebigge Lock No 56		SO987688
51		Tardebigge Lock No 55		SO986688
52		Tardebigge Lock No 54		SO986688
53		Tardebigge Lock No 53		SO984686
54		Tardebigge Lock No 52		SO984686
55		Tardebigge Lock No 51		SO984685
56		Tardebigge Lock No 50		SO984685
57		Tardebigge Lock No 49		SO982683
58		Tardebigge Lock No 48		SO982683
59		Tardebigge Lock No 47		SO980683
60		Tardebigge Lock No 46		SO979683
61		Tardebigge Lock No 45		SO979683
62		Tardebigge Lock No 44		SO978682
63		Tardebigge Lock No 43		SO976682
64		Tardebigge Lock No 42		SO976682
65		Tardebigge Lock No 41		SO975682
66		Tardebigge Lock No 40		SO974682
67		Tardebigge Lock No 39		SO973681
68		Tardebigge Lock No 38		SO972680
69		Tardebigge Lock No 37		SO971680
70		Tardebigge Lock No 36		SO970679
71		Tardebigge Lock No 35		SO969679
72		Tardebigge Lock No 34		SO968678
73		Tardebigge Lock No 33		SO967678
74		Tardebigge Lock No 32		SO966678
75		Tardebigge Lock No 31		SO965679
76		Tardebigge Lock No 30		SO964679
77		Tardebigge Bottom Lock No 29	52.3099°N 2.0542°W	SO962679
78		Stoke Top Lock No 28	52.3078°N 2.0578°W	SO961677
79		Stoke Lock No 27		SO956672
80		Stoke Lock No 26		SO958672
81		Stoke Lock No 25		SO956672
82		Stoke Lock No 24		SO955671
83		Stoke Prior Bottom Lock No 23	52.3015°N 2.0710°W	SO952670
84		Astwood Top Lock No 22	52.2880°N 2.0886°W	SO940655
85		Astwood Lock No 21		SO939654
86		Astwood Lock No 20		SO939653
87		Astwood Lock No 19		SO937652
88		Astwood Lock No 18		SO936650
89		Astwood Bottom Lock No 17	52.2781°N 2.0974°W	SO934644
90		Offerton Top Lock No 16	52.2205°N 2.1514°W	SO897580
91		Offerton Lock No 15		SO896580
92		Offerton Lock No 14		SO894580
93		Offerton Lock No 13		SO893580
94		Offerton Lock No 12		SO890578
95		Offerton Bottom Lock No 11	52.2178°N 2.1646°W	SO888577
96		Tolladine Lock No 10		SO877576
97		Blackpole Lock No 9		SO869576
98		Bilford Top Lock		SO856570
99		Bilford Bottom Lock		SO856569
100		Gregory's Mill Top Lock		SO850565
101		Gregory's Mill Bottom Lock		SO853553
102		Blockhouse Lock No 4		SO854546
103		Sidbury Lock No 3		SO852544
104		Diglis Basin Lock No 2		SO849538
105		Diglis Basin Lock No 1	52.1826°N 2.2229°W	SO848538

- From Blowers Green to Tardebigge top lock, the ring is at the Birmingham Level for 27 miles.

== Navigability ==
During spring freshet the Severn can be closed to navigation, making the ring not fully navigable. There is also potential for some sections of the ring being temporarily unnavigable consequent to lack of water during a drought.

== See also ==
- Canals of the United Kingdom
- Canal ring
- River Severn
