= Dearne and Dove Canal =

Canal in South Yorkshire, England

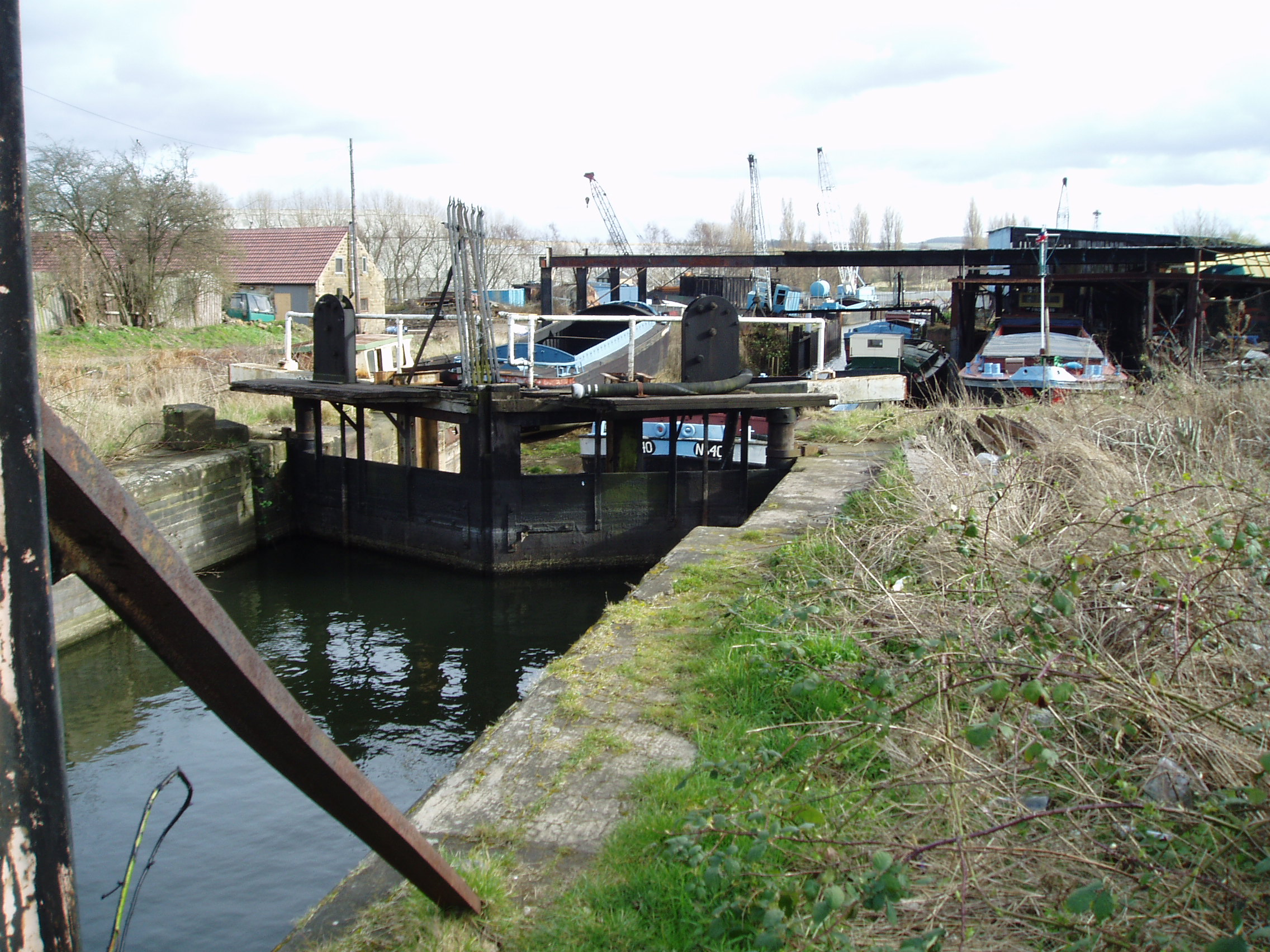
- The bottom gate of the third lock in 2008, with Waddington's yard occupying the line of the canal beyond

Specifications
- Maximum boat length: 58 ft 0 in (17.68 m)
- Maximum boat beam: 14 ft 10 in (4.52 m)
- Locks: 25
- Status: Restoration proposed, part new route

History
- Original owner: Dearne and Dove Canal Company
- Principal engineer: Robert Mylne
- Other engineer: John Thompson
- Date of act: 1793
- Date completed: 1804
- Date closed: 1961

Geography
- Start point: Barnsley; 53.5569°N 1.4640°W
- End point: Swinton; 53.4845°N 1.3028°W
- Branches: Elsecar, Worsborough
- Connects to: River Don Navigation, Barnsley Canal

The Dearne and Dove Canal ran for almost ten miles through South Yorkshire, England from Swinton to Barnsley through nineteen locks, rising 127 feet (39 m). The canal also had two short branches, the Worsbrough branch and the Elsecar branch, both about two miles long with reservoirs at the head of each. The Elsecar branch also has another six locks. The only tunnel was bypassed by a cutting in 1840.

The canal was created mainly to carry cargo from the extensive coal mining industry in the area. Other cargo included pig iron, glass, lime, oil products and general merchandise. A combination of railway competition and subsidence caused by the same mines it served forced the canal into a gradual decline, closing completely in 1961. As the local coal industry also collapsed in the 1980s the canal was thrown a lifeline with the forming of the Barnsley Canal Group who are now attempting to restore the whole canal, an effort further boosted by the abandonment of the railway which replaced it.

== History ==
=== Creation and early years ===
The idea of creating a navigable waterway from the River Don to Barnsley along the course of the River Dearne was first proposed in 1773 by Charles Watson-Wentworth, 2nd Marquess of Rockingham. However the idea was not pursued, until a meeting of the shareholders of the Don Navigation Company in 1792, where a canal from the River Don Navigation into Barnsley was proposed. At the same time the Aire and Calder Navigation Company was considering a canal from Wakefield to Barnsley. On 20 October 1792, the rival companies held a famous meeting at the White Bear Inn (now the Royal Hotel) in Barnsley and agreed to join their canals just south of Barnsley and go forward with complementary proposals. These were to become the Dearne and Dove Canal and the Barnsley Canal, both of which sought to provide access to the coalfields of Barnby bridge and Haigh bridge.

Dearne and Dove Canal Act 1793
- Act of Parliament
- Parliament of Great Britain
- Long title: An Act for making and maintaining a Navigable Canal from the River Dun Navigation Cut, in the Township of Swinton, to or near the Town of Barnsley, in the Parish of Silkstone, in the West Riding of the County of York, and certain Collateral Cuts branching out of the said Canal.
- Citation: 33 Geo. 3. c. 115
- Territorial extent: Great Britain

Dates
- Royal assent: 3 June 1793
- Commencement: 3 June 1793 (Note: The Acts of Parliament (Commencement) Act 1793.)
Other legislation
Amended by	Dearne and Dove Canal Act 1800
Relates to	Barnsley Canal Act 1808; North Midland Railway Act 1836; Barnsley Coal Railway Act 1861; British Transport Commission Act 1961

Status: Amended

Text of statute as originally enacted

Dearne and Dove Canal Act 1800
- Act of Parliament
- Parliament of Great Britain
- Long title: An Act to enable the Dearne and Dove Canal Company to finish and complete the said Canal, and the several Collateral Cuts branching therefrom; and for explaining, amending, and enlarging the Powers of an Act, passed in the thirty-third Year of the Reign of his present Majesty, for making and maintaining the said Canal and Collateral Cuts; and for encreasing the Tolls thereby granted.
- Citation: 39 & 40 Geo. 3. c. xxxvii
- Territorial extent: Great Britain

Dates
- Royal assent: 30 May 1800
- Commencement: 30 May 1800
Other legislation
Amends	Dearne and Dove Canal Act 1793
Relates to	South Yorkshire Railway and River Dun Company's Transfer Act 1864; British Transport Commission Act 1961

Status: Current legislation

Text of statute as originally enacted

The canal obtained its act of Parliament, the Dearne and Dove Canal Act 1793 (33 Geo. 3. c. 115) on 3 June 1793, on the same day as the Barnsley Canal Act 1793 (33 Geo. 3. c. 110), which authorised the building of the Barnsley Canal. The act created the Dearne and Dove Canal Company, consisting of 211 people, and allowed them to raise £60,000 by issuing shares, and a further £30,000 by mortgage if required. Robert Mylne was named as chief engineer on the project, and appears to have made the initial survey and given evidence to Parliament in support of the bill. However the construction was managed by John Thompson, the engineer to the Don Navigation Company, until he died in 1795. The post was then held by Robert Whitworth until 1799, when he died also, and it is thought that one of Whitworth's sons acted as engineer until the finish of the work. The canal was opened as far as Elsecar by 1798 and fully opened by November 1804 at a cost of just under £100,000. The cost overrun was managed when the company obtained a second act of Parliament, the Dearne and Dove Canal Act 1800 (39 & 40 Geo. 3. c. xxxvii) on 30 May 1800, which allowed the original option for a £30,000 mortgage to be raised by shares, a mortgage of £10,000 to be obtained, and the toll rates to be increased. Construction costs included the provision of two reservoirs, at Elsecar and Worsbrough, tramroads from Elsecar basin to two ironworks and a colliery, which included inclined planes, and a 472-yard (432 m) tunnel near Swinton, which was built using the cut-and-cover method. The main line rose by 127 feet (39 m) through 19 locks. The canal was shut briefly in the summers of 1805 and 1806 due to a shortage of water, but was initially successful and by 1830 it was carrying 181,000 tons of coal a year.

In the early 1820s, several proposals were made to build additional tramroads and reservoirs, but the plans were opposed by the Barnsley Canal and the Aire and Calder. Plans for an additional reservoir at Wentworth Castle, above the Worsbrough reservoir, were opposed in the House of Lords, unless the company would release its exclusive rights to build tramways from the canal to local collieries, and the bill was withdrawn, rather than agree to a clause which would have broken their monopoly on the coal reserves near to the canal. A decision was taken instead to raise the level of the Worsbrough reservoir by 4.5 feet (1.4 m), thereby increasing the surface area to 62 acres (25 ha), and this was completed in 1826.

=== Railway competition ===
The North Midland Railway, running from Leeds to Derby, opened in 1840 and this represented a major threat to the domination of the coal trade by all the South Yorkshire navigations. Parts of the railway ran alongside the canal. At Adwick upon Dearne the railway constructed a long cutting, and in order to maintain their alignment, the canal tunnel was demolished and the canal was re-routed to share the new cutting. The canal company took the opportunity to build interchange facilities with the new railway.

With the threat of the railways taking trade from the canals, the Don Navigation Company decided to purchase the Barnsley Canal, and to lease the Dearne and Dove for a year, after which they would buy it. The agreement with the Dearne and Dove went ahead, with the River Don Navigation taking over the canal from 1 January 1846, and paying £210,000 for it on 2 January 1847, but they failed to reach agreement with the Barnsley Canal. Tolls were reduced by 60 per cent in 1846, with free passage for empty boats from 1847, with the result that much of the coal traffic which had previously used the Barnsley Canal now used the Dearne and Dove. The South Yorkshire, Doncaster and Goole Railway Company was authorised in 1847, and the South Yorkshire, Doncaster and Goole Railway Act 1847 (10 & 11 Vict. c. ccxci) allowed them to amalgamate with the Don Navigation Company, and hence the Dearne and Dove, once they had raised half of their authorised capital. The amalgamation took place on 19 April 1850. The railway company opened their line from Doncaster to Swinton in November 1849, which was followed by a branch to Elsecar in February 1850, and another branch to Worsbrough in June 1850. At Elsecar, the canal basin was moved, and about 200 yards (180 m) of the canal were filled in to make way for the railway. While the takeover was beneficial to traffic on parts of the Don Navigation, tonnage carried on the Dearne and Dove fell.

Subsequently, both the railway and the canals were leased to the Manchester, Sheffield and Lincolnshire Railway, with a 999-year lease starting in June 1864, but in 1874 the lease became a takeover, and the canals were just a small part of a bigger undertaking. Users of the canals were unhappy with the high tolls and the lack of modernisation, and so in November 1888, the Sheffield and South Yorkshire Canal Company was formed, with the intent of obtaining the canals from the railway company. They obtained the Sheffield and South Yorkshire Navigation Act 1889 (52 & 53 Vict. c. cxc) on 26 August 1889, which created the Sheffield and South Yorkshire Navigation Company, with an authorised capital of £1.5 million, and powers to buy the canals, by compulsory purchase if agreement could not be reached with the railway company. The transfer did not occur until 1895, when agreement was finally reached, and the Dearne and Dove Canal became part of the Sheffield and South Yorkshire Navigation along with the Sheffield Canal, the River Don Navigation, and the Stainforth and Keadby Canal.

=== Decline ===
The Sheffield and South Yorkshire Navigation Company intended to upgrade the system to take 300 or 400 ton boats, and to allow compartment boats to be used. Coal from the collieries on the canal would transferred from the compartment boats to larger vessels at a new coal handling plant to be located at Keadby. However, the company failed to raise the finance to purchase the canals from the railway company outright, and so struggled to make significant improvements. The Dearne and Dove was the least profitable part of the system, with high maintenance costs as a result of subsidence from the coal mining. As early as 1884, a 25-yard (23 m) stretch of the Worsbrough branch had collapsed due to subsidence, which had taken 6 months and cost £19,000 to repair.

In 1906 the branch to Worsbrough closed due to the increasing cost of maintenance, although it was retained as a water feeder. The depth of water at the top end of the canal could only be maintained at 4.5 feet (1.4 m), rather than 6 feet (1.8 m), and in 1909, the company agreed to allow mining beneath the canal. The Elsecar branch was the next to close in 1928, also due to subsidence. The last boat traversed the central section of the main line in 1934, although an abandonment order for the canal was not obtained, as the company expected opposition to such a bill. After this date water levels were not maintained: this allowed the maintenance necessary to combat the ever-present mining subsidence to be reduced; only a mile or so of each end of the canal attracted traffic and was properly maintained. In 1942 traffic at the Barnsley end ceased. Traffic from the Manvers Main colliery ended in 1952, and despite vigorous campaigning for the reinstatement of the canal by the Inland Waterways Association and the Inland Waterways Protection Society in the late 1950s, the canal was finally closed in 1961, under the terms of the British Transport Commission Act 1961 (9 & 10 Eliz. 2. c. xxxvi). Only the half mile (0.8 km) to the glassworks in Swinton was retained. This included four locks which were supplied with water by pumps. The last boat called at the glassworks in 1977; since then the lower portion of the remaining canal has been incorporated into a boatyard, while the upper portion remains in water but not accessible by boat as the uppermost lock's gates have been replaced with a dam.

After closure the canal land passed into the hands of the local councils. Several drownings of children in the 1960s caused large parts of the canal in the Swinton and Wath-upon-Dearne areas to be filled in; however, much of the remaining canal was simply left to deteriorate, in some areas still in water, albeit at a much lower level than the original canal and very overgrown. Even as late as the early 1980s large parts of the canal line were easily recognisable with local roads passing over the old narrow sandstone hump-back canal bridges; however, since then road-improvement schemes have seen the removal of redundant bridges and in some areas the utilisation of the canal bed for new roads.

=== Restoration ===
On 1 April 1984, after a number of articles in the local press, twelve people met to address the lack of interest in local waterways. The Barnsley Canal Group was formed at this meeting and started campaigning for the preservation and restoration of the Dearne and Dove and Barnsley canals. Since the late 1980s the group has been active in trying to protect the remaining canal bed from obstruction through the local planning process.

In 1991 the canal group commenced restoring the top of the Elsecar branch of the canal in conjunction with work at what is now the Elsecar Heritage Centre. A feasibility study was also carried out on the branch. It determined that, although expensive, it is viable to restore that section of the canal. The Barnsley Canal Group was reformed as the Barnsley, Dearne & Dove Canals Trust in 2000.

== Preservation ==
State of original canal channel (Distances in miles)
Section	Obstructed	Filled In	Not in Water	In water
Main line	1.3 (13%)	6.5 (67%)	1 (10%)	1 (10%)
Elsecar Branch	NIL	0.1 (6%)	1 (47%)	1 (47%)
Worsbrough Branch	NIL	1 (50%)	0.9 (44%)	0.1 (6%)
Whole Canal	1.3 (9%)	7.6 (55%)	2.9 (21%)	2.1 (15%)

The two branches have fared far better than the main line since its closure. The more rural nature of these sections means that the land has been left relatively untouched. In parts of the main line problems of obstruction and poor maintenance means that alternative routes have been suggested. This is particularly acute in Wath-upon-Dearne, Wombwell and Stairfoot where road improvement and land-reclamation schemes have utilised and obliterated several miles of the former canal bed.

The closure of all the local mines that the canal served means that further subsidence is no longer a problem. The abandonment of the railway line that replaced the canal in 1988 has given the canal an alternative route. This land has been secured from intrusion by other land users and will be relatively easily excavated to create a new channel. It is also being used as part of the Trans Pennine Trail.

The canal is referred to as 'a vital missing link' by the Barnsley, Dearne & Dove Canals Trust. Their aim is to completely restore the canal along with the Barnsley Canal in order to complete the Yorkshire Ring. The canal is now undergoing restoration. The Elsecar branch is to be the first part of the canal to be restored. The top two pounds and top lock have been restored and a launch ramp has been added in the top pound. Funding was obtained from the Yorkshire European Community Trust, and the lock gates were fitted in May 1999. Other parts of the canal such as the top of the Worsbrough branch have remained in good condition despite years of neglect.

Parts of the towpath form sections of the Trans Pennine Trail, a long-distance footpath that connects Liverpool, Leeds, Hull and Chesterfield. The reservoir at the top of the Elsecar branch has been designated a local nature reserve by Barnsley Council and the area surrounding the reservoir at the top of the Worsbrough branch has become Worsbrough Country Park.

== Original route ==
=== Main Line ===
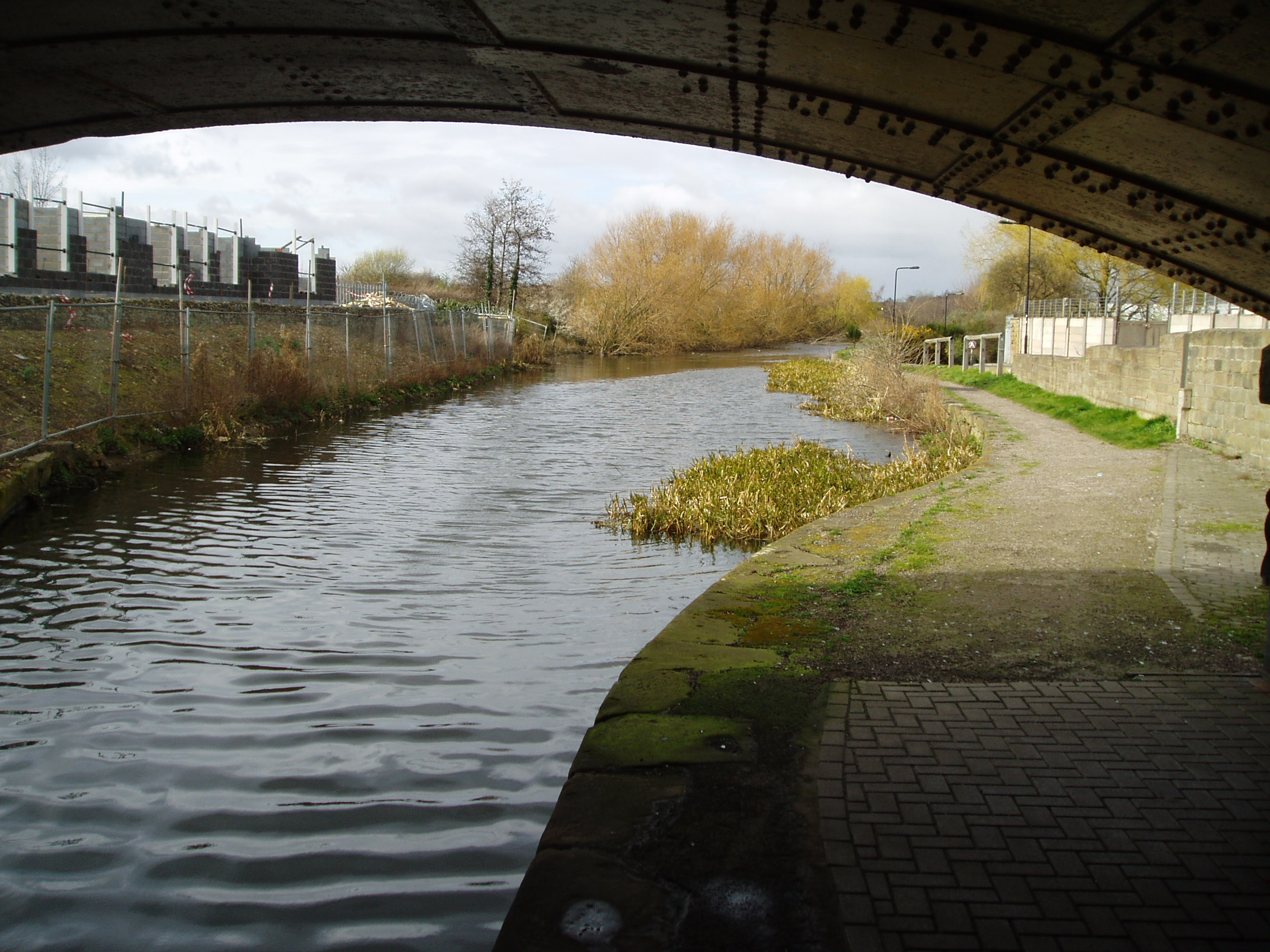
A short section above the fourth lock remains in water, although the top gate of the lock has been replaced by a concrete wall

The canal started at a junction with the Don Navigation at Swinton. From there it passed through six locks before it passed through a 472-yard tunnel. This tunnel was bypassed in 1840 when the canal was diverted to run through the same cutting created to accommodate the railway. It then passed Manvers Main Colliery and entered Wath-upon-Dearne running parallel to Doncaster Road, before passing between rows of terraced houses past the town centre. It then looped north-west towards the middle of the valley, with a wide section on a high embankment which became known as the Bay of Biscay. After that it passed into Brampton and back onto the hillside. There were another four locks up to the junction with the Elsecar branch, which lay between Brampton and Wombwell at the junction of the Dearne Valley Parkway and the A633.

The canal then passed Wombwell to the north of the town centre, and Aldham before arriving at the eight locks of the Stairfoot flight. At that point there followed the junction with the Worsbrough Branch. The canal then passed through the site of Stairfoot Roundabout and headed towards Hoyle Mill where a final stop lock marks the boundary between the Dearne & Dove and Barnsley Canals.

=== Elsecar Branch ===
The Elsecar branch was built to serve the coal mines and so went past many of them. Starting in Brampton the branch passed Cortonwood Colliery (now a retail park). After passing below Hemingfield and the site of the Hemingfield Colliery it finished at Elsecar basin. The reservoir is about another half a mile from the basin past the heritage centre. The majority of the towpath is on the Elsecar Greenway, part of the Trans Pennine Trail.

=== Worsbrough Branch ===
After leaving Stairfoot the Worsbrough branch passes through Swaithe and then passes under the Penistone Line. After this it ran alongside the River Dove until reaching Worsbrough Basin. The reservoir is just beyond the basin.

== Proposed restoration route ==
In the survey done by the Barnsley Canal Group in 1987 it was established that the original route of the canal would be very difficult to restore. This is due in large part to canal land reclaimed by the council in the 1970s. Over time, several proposals have been put forward as to a possible new route. These include the use of the River Dearne or the use of the Mexborough to Barnsley railway line, which was abandoned in 1988.

In August 2004, a professional engineering company was commissioned to conduct a feasibility study of restoration options, and presented its findings in November 2006. The estimated costs for a full restoration of the Dearne and Dove and the Barnsley Canals to take narrow boats was £127 million, and the likely benefits to the local economy were estimated at £3.1 million per year. The route which this proposed would follow the old route through Swinton onto the old Manvers pit pony field where it would divert around the newly built Dearne Valley College and Call Centres. It would then divert around to the north of Wath-Upon-Dearne via an Aqueduct to join up to its old route. There would be relatively minor course corrections to the rest of the route through to Barnsley, although it would follow a parallel route to the original canal on this section.

== Barnsley Canals Consortium ==
The Barnsley Canals Consortium is the name given to all the interested parties who are cooperating in order to restore the Dearne and Dove along with its sister canal the Barnsley. Its members include:-

- Barnsley, Dearne & Dove Canals Trust
- Inland Waterways Association
- Royston and Carlton Partnership
- Barnsley Metropolitan Borough Council
- Rotherham Metropolitan Borough Council
- Wakefield City Council

== Points of interest ==
Point	Coordinates (Links to map resources)	OS Grid Ref	Notes
Junction with River Don Navigation	53.4845°N 1.3028°W	SK463988	
Wakefield Line railway bridge	53.4902°N 1.3061°W	SK461995	
Start of Brampton Locks	53.5138°N 1.3778°W	SE413020	
Junction with Elsecar Branch	53.5166°N 1.3822°W	SE410023	
Elsecar Reservoir	53.4909°N 1.4239°W	SK383995	
End of watered section	53.5252°N 1.3999°W	SE398033	
Start of Stairfoot flight	53.5343°N 1.4178°W	SE386043	
Head of Stairfoot flight, Worsborough Branch	53.5366°N 1.4317°W	SE377045	
Worsborough Basin	53.5263°N 1.4697°W	SE352034	
Junction with Barnsley Canal	53.5569°N 1.4640°W	SE356068	

== See also ==
- Canals of Great Britain
- History of the British canal system

== Bibliography ==
- Elliot, Brian (1995). Aspects of Barnsley 3. Wharncliffe Publishing. ISBN 978-1-871647-26-6.
- Bullock, David (December 1991). Dearne And Dove Canal - the Vital Link (PDF) (Second ed.). Barnsley Canal Group. Archived (PDF) from the original on 31 March 2012.
- Glister, Roger (2004). The Forgotten Canals of Yorkshire. Warncliffe Publishing. ISBN 978-1-903425-38-1.
- Hadfield, Charles (1972). The Canals of Yorkshire and North East England (Vol 1). David and Charles. ISBN 978-0-7153-5719-4.
- Hadfield, Charles (1973). The Canals of Yorkshire and North East England (Vol 2). David and Charles. ISBN 978-0-7153-5975-4.
- Priestley, Joseph (1831). Historical Account of the Navigable Rivers, Canals, and Railways of Great Britain. Archived from the original on 3 March 2016.
- Squires, Roger (2008). Britain's Restored Canals. Landmark Publishing. ISBN 978-1-84306-331-5.
