= Barnsley Canal =

Canal that ran from Barnby Basin, through Barnsley, South Yorkshire, England

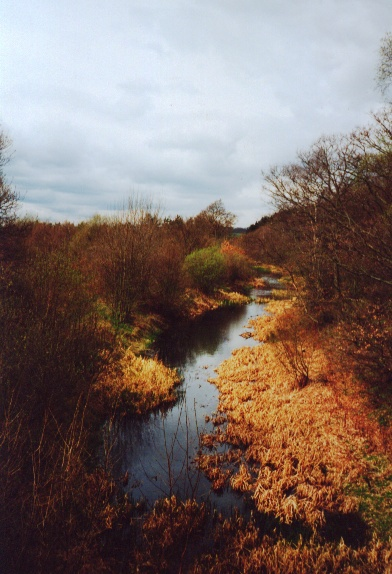
- The canal in Haw Park Woods near Wakefield
- Interactive map of Barnsley Canal

Specifications
- Length: 14.5 miles (23.3 km)
- Maximum boat length: 84 ft 0 in (25.60 m) (originally 66 ft 0 in or 20.12 m)
- Maximum boat beam: 14 ft 0 in (4.27 m)
- Locks: 17
- Status: Restoration proposed

History
- Original owner: Barnsley Canal Company
- Principal engineer: Samual Hartley
- Date of act: 1793
- Date of first use: 1799
- Date completed: 1802
- Date closed: 1893, 1946

Geography
- Start point: Barnsley
- End point: Heath Common
- Branch of: Aire and Calder Navigation
- Connects to: Dearne and Dove Canal

The Barnsley Canal is a canal that ran from Barnby Basin, through Barnsley, South Yorkshire, England, to a junction with the Aire and Calder Navigation near Wakefield, West Yorkshire. It was built in the 1790s, to provide a transport link from coal reserves at Barnsley to a wider market. Both the Aire and Calder Navigation and the River Don Navigation took a keen interest in the project, the former buying many of the initial shares, and the latter constructing the Dearne and Dove Canal to link the canal to their waterway. Water supply issues meant that the Aire and Calder proposed pumping all of the water for the canal from the River Calder, using steam pumps, but a reservoir was built at Cold Hiendley instead, increasing the construction costs, but reducing the running costs. The canal as built was 14.5 miles (23.3 km) long and included 15 locks.

Traffic came initially from the colliery at Barnby Furnace, but this failed in 1806, and the company found itself with no money and little traffic. Gradually, tramways to other mines were built, and traffic increased, enough to pay dividends to the shareholders from 1810 onwards. Many bridges were raised between 1828 and 1830, to accommodate larger barges. Railways arrived in the area in the 1840s, and traffic volumes decreased rapidly, but the canal was taken over by the Aire and Calder Navigation in 1856, and despite competition from the railways, and structural damage from subsidence, remained profitable until 1942. The locks below Cold Hiendley were lengthened between 1879 and 1881, and the final section including the five Barugh locks was closed in 1893.

A major breach occurred in 1911, resulting in the canal being closed for nearly a year, and further breaches occurred in 1945 and 1946. The Aire and Calder applied to abandon the canal in 1947, and despite protestations from the fledgling Inland Waterways Association, the right to do so was granted in 1953. The aqueduct over the River Dearne was demolished immediately. The Barnsley Canal Group was formed in 1984, to campaign for restoration, eventually becoming the Barnsley, Dearne and Dove Canal Trust in June 2000. They are now part of the Barnsley Canal Consortium, which has commissioned a study which showed that restoration is feasible. A restored route would involve three diversions from the historic route, at Walton locks, near Cold Hiendley reservoir, and where the canal crosses the River Dearne.

== History ==
The early 1790s were a time when there was an increasing demand for coal, but a shortage in many places because much of the coal being produced was being consumed by industries close to the mines. There were coal reserves near Barnsley, but no transport links to distribute it to the region. In July 1792, the Aire and Calder Canal Company asked William Martin, who was the manager of the canal, to prepare plans for a link from near Wakefield to the Barnsley mines. Hearing of the plans, the River Don Navigation Company proposed an alternative, which involved the canalisation of the River Dearne, to reach the same destination. The Aire and Calder scheme foresaw a healthy trade in coal and manufactured goods from Barnsley to the Aire and Calder, and agricultural lime from Knottingley in the reverse direction.

Martin and the Aire and Calder's resident engineers surveyed the route, and at a public meeting held on 20 September 1792, the canal engineer William Jessop suggested that the line from just below Wakefield to Barnsley and Silkstone could be built for approximately £50,000. The Aire and Calder decided to subscribe £20,000 for shares, to ensure that they held a majority shareholding. A further meeting in mid-October reported that the cost was now £60,000, and that 86 people had subscribed to it. The River Don company attended the meeting, as they were keen to use the Barnsley to Silkstone route for their Dearne and Dove Canal, but an agreement was reached, whereby the Barnsley Canal Company would build the Barnby to Barnsley section, but no water would be taken from the River Dearne, which was needed to supply the Dearne and Dove Canal. A 2.5-mile (4.0 km) branch from Barugh to Haigh Bridge, including an extra seven locks, was added to the scheme.

Barnsley Canal Act 1793
- Act of Parliament
- Parliament of Great Britain
- Long title: An Act for making and maintaining a Navigable Canal from the River Calder, in the Township of Warmfield cum Heath, to or near the Town of Barnsley, and from thence to Barnby Bridge, in the Township of Cawthorne, in the West Riding of the County of York, and certain Railways and other Roads to communicate therewith.
- Citation: 33 Geo. 3. c. 110
- Territorial extent: Great Britain

Dates
- Royal assent: 3 June 1793
- Commencement: 3 June 1793 (Note: The Acts of Parliament (Commencement) Act 1793.)
Other legislation
Amended by	Barnsley Canal Act 1808; Aire and Calder Navigation Act 1893; Aire and Calder Navigation Act 1901
Relates to	North Midland Railway Act 1836; South Yorkshire Railway and River Dun Company Act 1850

Status: Amended

Text of statute as originally enacted

The Aire and Calder proposed to pump all the water for the canal from the River Calder, using steam-driven pumps at Agbrigg, Walton and Barugh. The Haigh branch would have required a fourth engine, but the Haigh furnace closed and the branch was never built. The pumps at Walton and Agbrigg were replaced by a reservoir at Cold Hiendley, which increased the construction costs by £3,000, but reduced running costs by £350 per year. An act of Parliament, the Barnsley Canal Act 1793 (33 Geo. 3. c. 110), was obtained on 3 June 1793, which created the company and authorised them to raise £72,000 by the issuing of shares, with an additional £25,000 by shares or by mortgage if it was required. The Dearne and Dove canal was authorised on the same day.

=== Construction ===
Construction work started on 27 September 1793, at Heath Common, near the junction with the Aire and Calder Canal. Samual Hartley was the engineer, and John Pinkerton was contracted to build the canal. Construction was difficult, with Pinkerton unexpectedly encountering rock in the cutting at Cold Hiendley, and inflation pushed up the costs. There were disputes between Hartley and Pinkerton, which lasted until long after the canal was opened, and were finally settled in 1812, after a lawsuit. The northern section to Barnsley opened on 8 June 1799, while the Barnsley to Barnby section was not started until late 1798, and did not open until early 1802. The Dearne and Dove Canal was completed in late 1804.

The cost of construction was £95,000. The original scheme envisaged a number of tramways to connect to the coal mines, but none of these were built initially. Major engineering features included a five-arched aqueduct where the canal crossed the River Dearne, a long cutting at Cold Hiendley, five locks at Barugh, another twelve at Walton, two at Agbrigg and the final one near Heath. This lock was situated at the end of a cut, which frequently filled with rubbish, and so it was replaced in 1816 by a new lock much closer to the Aire and Calder. The Wintersett reservoir covered an area of 80 acres (32 ha) when first built, which increased to 127 acres (51 ha) when its banks were raised by 4 feet (1.2 m) in 1807. In 1803, a pumping station was built at Ryhill, using a Cornish beam engine obtained from Harveys of Hayle, which pumped surplus water from the canal up into the reservoir. Land for a second reservoir at Cold Hiendley was obtained in 1840, and it was built in 1854. It was located between Wintersett Reservoir and the canal, but was at a lower level, and the pumping station was modified so that water could also be pumped from the new reservoir into the canal. The Cold Hiendley reservoir was enlarged to cover 55 acres (22 ha) in 1874. The beam engine, which was probably second-hand in 1803, gave good service and lasted until the closure of the canal in 1946.

=== Traffic ===
Barnsley Canal Act 1808
- Act of Parliament
- Parliament of the United Kingdom
- Long title: An Act for amending and enlarging the Powers of an Act of His present Majesty, for making and maintaining the Barnsley Canal Navigation, and certain Railways and other Roads to communicate therewith; and for increasing the Rates, Tolls, and Duties thereby granted.
- Citation: 48 Geo. 3. c. xiii
- Territorial extent: United Kingdom

Dates
- Royal assent: 28 March 1808
- Commencement: 28 March 1808
Other legislation
Amends	Barnsley Canal Act 1793
Relates to	Dearne and Dove Canal Act 1793; South Yorkshire, Doncaster and Goole Railway Act 1847

Status: Amended

Text of statute as originally enacted

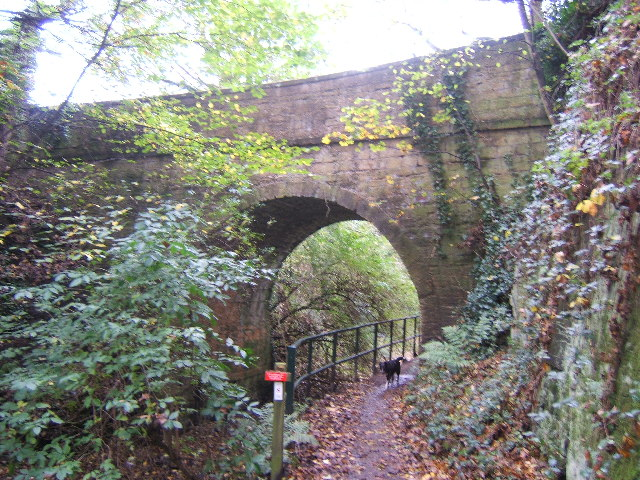
Looking south near Walton

The canal was principally designed to carry coal from collieries in the Barnby region. The Low Moor Company had a colliery at Barnby Furnace, and constructed the 0.5-mile (0.8 km) long Low Moor Waggonway between there and Barnby basin, which was carrying coal by 1802. By 1804, around 10,000 tons was leaving the colliery, although the Dearne and Dove Canal had opened in late 1803, and only about half of the trade travelled the full length of the canal to the Aire and Calder. Coal from the Silkstone collieries was sporadic, as the tramway which had been authorised by the act of Parliament was not built due to financial constraints. The Barnby Furnace mine failed in May 1807, and the company found itself with no money and little traffic. It obtained a new act of Parliament, the Barnsley Canal Act 1808 (48 Geo. 3. c. xiii), on 28 March 1808, authorising it to raise another £43,000 in share capital, and £10,000 by mortgage. They were also able to raise the tolls.

The Silkstone Waggonway was completed in 1810. Barnby basin was enlarged to cope with the expected trade, which grew steadily. Coal accounted for just 23 per cent of the 22,270 tons carried in 1800, but had risen to 109,945 tons out of a total of 181,063 tons by 1821. The other main cargoes were corn and limestone. Receipts also rose, from £2,028 in 1803 to 7,649 in 1821, the latter figure being supplemented by a further £2,094 raised from tramway tolls. Profits were sufficient to pay dividends from 1810. In order to keep the boats moving, the Barnsley Canal Company attempted to take water from the River Dearne on several occasions, and were ordered to remove the works which diverted the water by the River Don Navigation Company, who had sponsored the Dearne and Dove Canal. A compromise was reached in 1812, which allowed some of the Dearne water to be used by the Barnsley canal. Between 1828 and 1830, a number of bridges were raised, to allow larger vessels, called "Billy-boys", to use the canal.

=== Competition ===
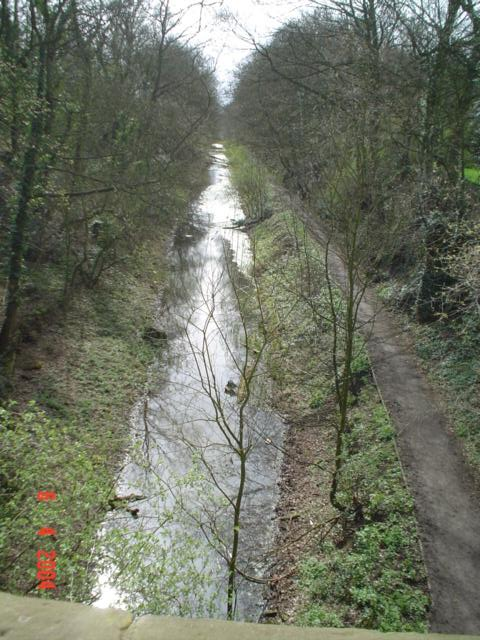
At Walton, the towpath forms part of the Trans Pennine Trail

Competition in the form of railways started to affect the canal from the 1840s. The canal company initially welcomed some of the schemes, but the Don Navigation Company proposed to lease the canal for a year in 1845 and then to buy it, in order to prevent the railways gaining access to the Silkstone coal resources, and to protect the water supplies. They quickly offered to pass the canal on to the Aire and Calder Company, and to buy the Dearne and Dove Canal, but although they took over the Dearne and Dove Canal from 1 January 1846, they dropped their ideas for the Barnsley Canal. The Barnsley Canal Company then tried to arrange a lease with the Aire and Calder, but negotiations foundered. A series of negotiations took place with the Yorkshire Railway Company, the Manchester, Sheffield and Lincolnshire Railway and the Aire and Calder Navigation between 1846 and 1853. It was not until 1854 that the company finally agreed to a lease from the Aire and Calder, by which time traffic was falling rapidly. The takeover was ratified by an act of Parliament in 1856, although the Barnsley Canal Company was not wound up, as it continued to collect the rent from the lease.

Barnsley Canal Transfer Act 1871 (Note: Section 1.)
- Act of Parliament
- Parliament of the United Kingdom
- Long title: An Act for authorising the transfer of the Undertaking of the Company of Proprietors of the Barnsley Canal Navigation to the Undertakers of the Navigation of the Rivers of Aire and Calder in the county of York, and for providing a better supply of Water to the said Canal; and for other purposes.
- Citation: 34 & 35 Vict. c. cxcv
- Territorial extent: United Kingdom

Dates
- Royal assent: 14 August 1871
- Commencement: 14 August 1871

Status: Current legislation

Text of statute as originally enacted

By reducing tolls, the Aire and Calder managed to increase traffic from 179,295 tons in 1855 to 291,313 tons in 1863, but traffic gradually reduced after that, as railway links to the coalfields were built. The canal structures were increasingly affected by subsidence from the mining, and an inspection of the aqueduct in 1866 revealed "fissures in the rock and cracks in the arches". In 1870, Barnsley Corporation ordered the canal company to stop extracting water from the River Dearne, as they needed the supply. Faced with a dilemma, the Barnsley and the Aire and Calder companies negotiated, and the result was the Barnsley Canal Transfer Act 1871 (34 & 35 Vict. c. cxcv), which authorised the takeover of the canal by the Aire and Calder, the replacing of ten of the twelve Walton locks by an inclined plane, and protection of the water supply at Barugh.

Aire and Calder Navigation Act 1893
- Act of Parliament
- Parliament of the United Kingdom
- Long title: An Act to amend the Acts relating to the Barnsley Canal of the Undertakers of the Navigation of the Rivers of Aire and Calder in the West Riding of the County of York in respect to minerals under or near that Canal and other matters to authorise the Undertakers to close the upper portion of such Canal to extend the time for the purchase of lands and to make further provisions in respect of their undertaking and for other purposes.
- Citation: 56 & 57 Vict. c. cxlviii
- Territorial extent: United Kingdom

Dates
- Royal assent: 27 July 1893
- Commencement: 27 July 1893

Status: Current legislation

Text of statute as originally enacted

The locks below Cold Hiendley were lengthened from 66 feet (20 m) to 84 feet (26 m) between 1879 and 1881, but by this time there was little traffic on the upper section. The final 1.3-mile (2.1 km) section to Barnby, including the five locks at Barugh were abandoned under the terms of the Aire and Calder Navigation Act 1893 (56 & 57 Vict. c. cxlviii). Powers to build the inclined plane were renewed in 1889, but no construction took place. Despite railway competition, the canal still carried in excess of 200,000 tons per year between 1885 and 1909.

=== Decline ===
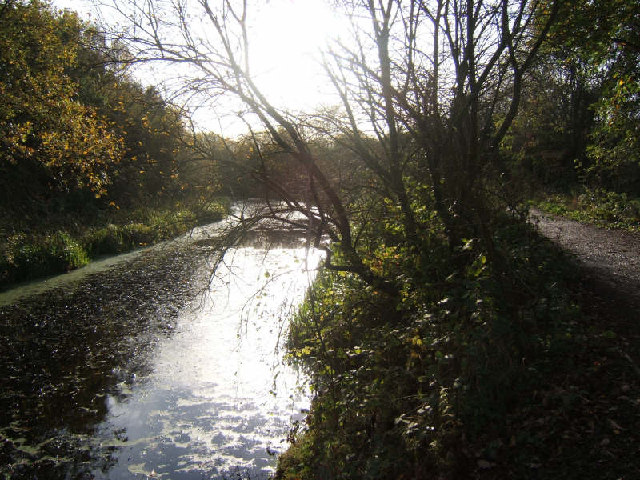
Looking southeast along the canal and towpath below Hiendley Reservoir

A major breach of the canal occurred on 20 November 1911, when subsidence caused part of the aqueduct and the adjacent embankment to fail. Repairs were not completed until 10 July 1912, when the canal was reopened. The canal had to close for four months at the end of 1922 due to drought conditions. In 1934, the county council installed an electric lift bridge at Royston. Traffic continued to fall, and maintenance costs increased as the effects of subsidence damaged the infrastructure, but the canal remained profitable until 1942. The following year, the Royston bridge was operated 856 times to allow boats to pass. Mottram Wood colliery was flooded on 13 June 1945, when another leak occurred near the aqueduct, and in 1946, 53 million imperial gallons (240,000 m^{3}) of water escaped from the canal on 22 November, flooding a housing estate and the surrounding countryside. The Aire and Calder applied to abandon the canal in May 1947, and although the fledgeling Inland Waterways Association campaigned for its retention, the Docks and Inland Waterways Executive (DIWE) expressed "grave doubts as to whether it would be in the national interest to reinstate the waterway." The DIWE then offered compensation to carriers who were affected by the closure, and the abandonment order was finally granted in 1953. The aqueduct was demolished immediately, as it was deemed to be unsafe.

== Restoration ==
The line of the canal below Barugh has remained largely intact, and in April 1984, the Barnsley Canal Group was formed, with the aim of campaigning for the restoration of the canal. Their first task was to undertake a detailed survey of the canal, to confirm that restoration was at least realistic. Having become a Limited Company and obtaining charitable status in April 1991, the group reformed as the Barnsley, Dearne and Dove Canal Trust in June 2000. In May 2001, the Barnsley Canal Consortium, consisting of a working group which includes local authorities, the Inland Waterways Association and the Canal Trust, was formed. The Consortium employed professional engineers to carry out a feasibility study on the reopening of both the Barnsley Canal and the Dearne and Dove Canal in August 2004, and the report, which was published in November 2006 confirmed that restoration was possible.

The restored canal would follow the original line from the Aire and Calder Navigation to Barnsley, where a new marina would be built near to the location of Barugh locks. Three diversions would be required, one at the foot of the Walton locks, one near Cold Hiendley reservoir, and one where the canal crosses the River Dearne, where the original aqueduct has been demolished.

In 2019, a public enquiry about Barnsley Metropolitan District Council's local plan was held, at which the council recommended that a firm line for the restored canal should not be included, and this decision was upheld by the inspector. In the light of this, the lack of new members, and the impact of the coronavirus pandemic, the Trust took the decision to cease operation in April 2020, although the AGM at which the decision would be ratified was postponed due to the pandemic. They are expected to transfer their assets to the Chesterfield Canal Trust, who will also ensure that the Trust website is maintained as a source of information for some years.

In 2020, a local resident from Redbrook called James Crampton set up a Facebook group called Barnsley Old Canal during the Coronavirus lockdown, where people could share their stories of the canal. Within a few months, over 450 people had registered an interest in maintaining the canal's heritage. Before long, people started to think about restoration, and the group have decided that their first objective should be improvements to the towpath between Barugh Green and Smithies.

== Points of interest ==
Point	Coordinates (Links to map resources)	OS Grid Ref	Notes
Jn with Aire & Calder Navigation	53.6752°N 1.4728°W	SE349199	
Agbrigg bottom lock	53.6694°N 1.4688°W	SE351193	
Walton bottom lock	53.6558°N 1.4624°W	SE356178	
Walton top lock	53.6446°N 1.4552°W	SE361165	
Cold Hiendley Reservoir	53.6274°N 1.4485°W	SE365146	
Shaw Bridge (diversion reqd)	53.5862°N 1.4399°W	SE371101	
Jn with Dearne and Dove Canal	53.5569°N 1.4641°W	SE355068	
Barugh bottom lock	53.5757°N 1.5212°W	SE318089	
Barnby Basin	53.5677°N 1.5402°W	SE305079	

== See also ==
- Canals of Great Britain
- History of the British canal system
- Waterscape

== Bibliography ==
- Hadfield, Charles (1972). The Canals of Yorkshire and North East England (Vol 1). David and Charles. ISBN 0-7153-5719-0.
- Hadfield, Charles (1973). The Canals of Yorkshire and North East England (Vol 2). David and Charles. ISBN 0-7153-5975-4.
- Priestley, Joseph (1831). "Historical Account of the Navigable Rivers, Canals, and Railways of Great Britain". Archived from the original on 10 March 2016.
- Russell, Ronald (1982). Lost Canals and Waterways of Britain. David and Charles. ISBN 0-7153-8072-9.
- Shepherd, Emma (27 November 2020). "Group work towards restoring Barnsley Canal stretch". Barnsley Chronicle. Archived from the original on 16 May 2022.
- Squires, Roger (2008). Britain's restored canals. Landmark Publishing. ISBN 978-1-84306-331-5.
- Ware, Michael E. (1989). Britain's Lost Waterways. Moorland Publishing. ISBN 0-86190-327-7.
