= Haigh, West Yorkshire =

Village in South Yorkshire, England

Coordinates: 53.602°N 1.558°W

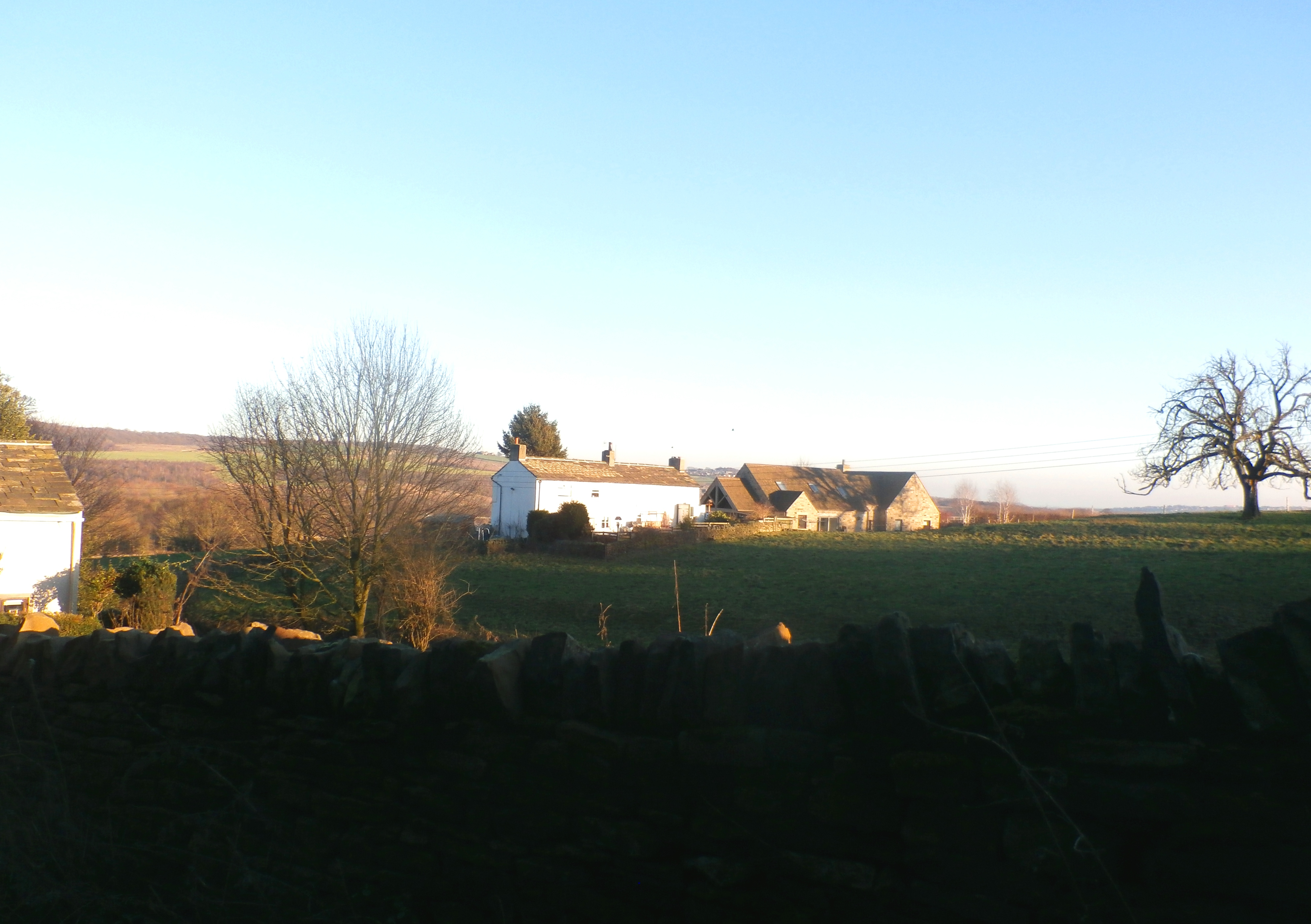
Some houses at Haigh

Haigh is a hamlet, northwest of Barnsley in South Yorkshire England. It is adjacent to the River Dearne which forms the county boundary with West Yorkshire and contains Junction 38 of the M1 motorway. The Yorkshire Sculpture Park in West Bretton is immediately to the north. Haigh was once known as Southange.

Haigh grew as a small pit village and had a colliery until 1968 when Woolley Colliery became the main source of employment until its closure in 1987.

Haigh was historically part of the West Riding of Yorkshire in the Staincross Wapentake and the Parish of Darton. It became part of the Metropolitan Borough of Barnsley in April 1974.
