= Black country ring =

Canal ring in England

Coordinates: 52°48′15″N 2°0′32″W

Black Country Ring
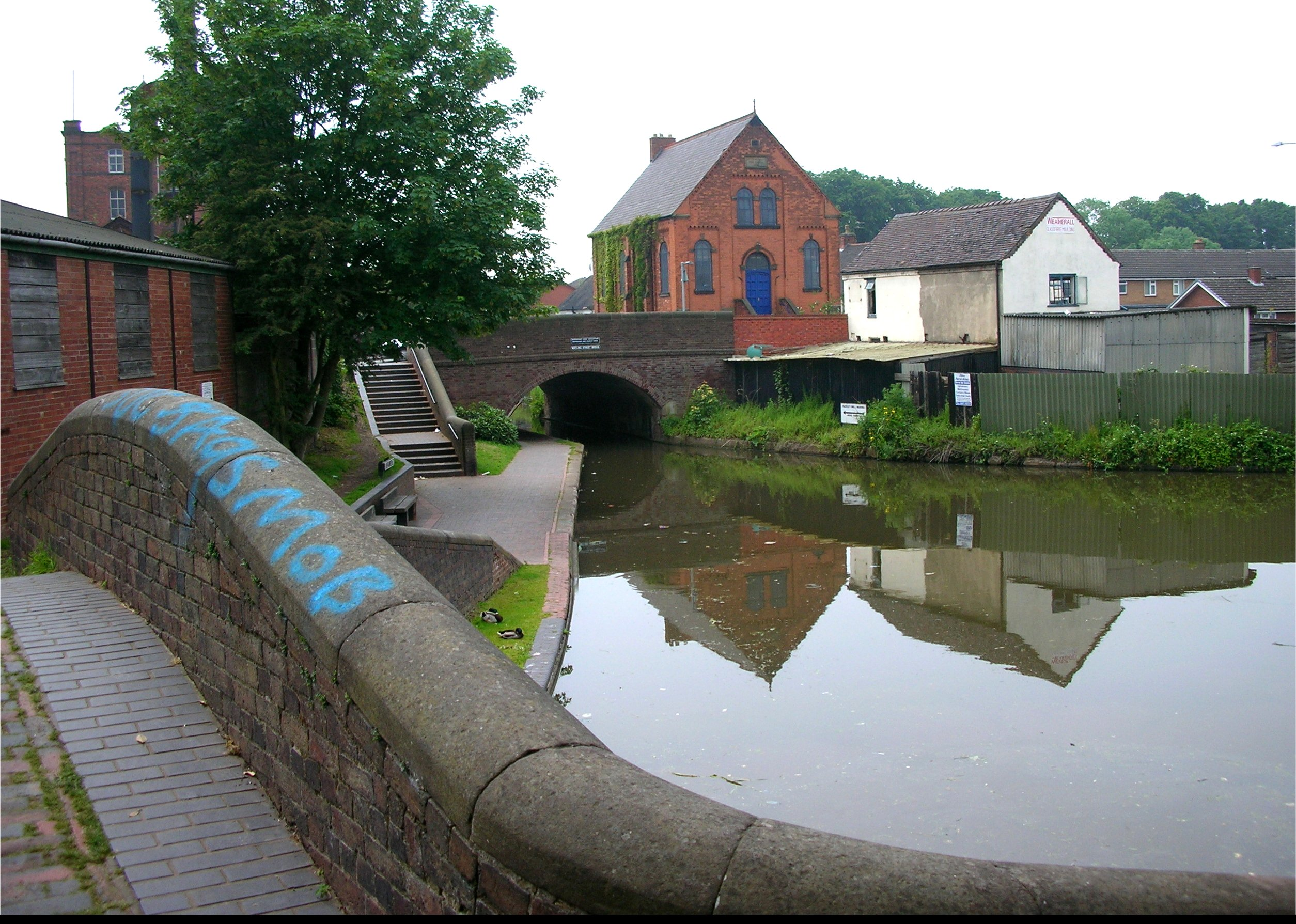
- The junction between the Coventry Canal and the Birmingham and Fazeley Canal
- Interactive map of Black Country Ring

Specifications
- Length: 68 miles (109 km)
- Locks: 71
- Status: Canal ring
- Navigation authority: Canal & River Trust

The Black Country Ring, also known as the Staffordshire Ring, is a UK canal ring composed of the Staffordshire and Worcestershire Canal, Birmingham Main Line, Birmingham and Fazeley Canal, Coventry Canal and Trent and Mersey Canal. It covers 68 miles (109 km) of canals, and requires the boater to navigate through 71 locks. It takes about ten days to complete the route.

== Route ==
Starting at Great Haywood Junction, where the Staffordshire and Worcestershire Canal joins the Trent and Mersey Canal, and proceeding clockwise around the ring, the Black country ring follows parts of the following canals.

- Trent and Mersey Canal
- Coventry Canal
- Birmingham and Fazeley Canal
- Birmingham Canal Navigations Main Line
- Staffordshire and Worcestershire Canal

=== Trent and Mersey Canal ===
Construction of the Trent and Mersey Canal was authorised in 1766, and it opened throughout in 1777. From Great Haywood Junction, it heads in a south-easterly direction, descending through five locks over a distance of 12.7 miles (20.4 km), to reach Fradley Junction, where the Coventry Canal joins it.

=== Coventry Canal ===
The Coventry Canal was authorised in 1768, and reached Atherstone in 1771, but construction then stopped as they had run out of money. They eventually built some more, reaching Fazeley in 1790, but that was still 12 miles (19 km) short of Fradley, where the canal was supposed to terminate. The Birmingham and Fazeley Canal had also reached Fazeley by that time, and in order to ensure their canal was viable, agreed to build part of the Coventry Canal's route to Fradley, as far as Whittington Brook. The final part of the route from Whittington Brook to Fradley was built by the Grand Trunk Canal, later known as the Trent and Mersey Canal. When the route was completed, the Coventry Canal bought the section built by the Grand Trunk Canal, but not the section built by the Birmingham and Fazeley Canal.

From Fradley Junction, the Coventry Canal heads southwards for 4 miles (6.4 km) to Huddlesford Junction, where it used to connect with a branch of the Wyrley and Essington Canal, now being restored as the Lichfield Canal. 1.5 miles (2.4 km) after that junction, it reaches Whittington Brook and the section built by the Birmingham and Fazeley Canal. This continues for another 5.5 miles (8.9 km) to reach Fazeley Junction, where there is a right turn onto the rest of the Coventry Canal, while the Birmingham and Fazeley Canal continues southwards.

=== Birmingham and Fazeley Canal ===
The Birmingham and Fazeley Canal faced stiff opposition from the Birmingham Canal Company, but managed to obtain an Act of Parliament to authorise construction in 1784. Shortly afterwards, the two companies merged. Construction of the new canal was finished in 1789, although they started work on the Coventry Canal's route to Whittington Brook straight afterwards, under an agreement reached between several canal companies n 1782.

Just 3 miles (4.8 km) to the south of Fazeley Junction, the ascent to Birmingham begins. The first eleven locks are collectively known as Curdworth Locks. Locks 2 to 6 are closer together than the rest, and very close to the M42 motorway. Curdworth Tunnel follows shortly afterwards, although it is only 57 yards (52 m) long. 2.5 miles (4.0 km) from Curdworth top lock is the first of three locks at Minworth. The open fields of the Curdworth section give way to the industrial landscape of Birmingham, and 2.9 miles (4.7 km) from Minworth top lock, the canal reaches Salford Junction. The Tame Valley Canal joins the Birmingham and Fazeley at Slaford Junction, as does a branch of the Grand Union Canal, originally the Birmingham and Warwick Junction Canal, both of which were built in the 1840s to relieve pressure on the flight of eleven locks at Aston on the Birmingham and Fazeley route. Just above Aston top lock is Aston Junction, where the Digbeth Branch turns off, which is followed by the flight of 13 locks at Farmers Bridge. At Old Turn or Deep Cuttings Junction, the canal joins the Birmingham Main Line, 15 miles (24 km) from Fazeley Junction.

=== Birmingham Main Line ===
The Birmingham Canal Navigations, now usually shortened to the BCN, began life in 1768 when the Birmingham Canal Company was authorised to build a canal between Birmingham and Aldersley, on the Staffordshire and Worcestershire Canal. The canal began at Gas Street Basin, 0.2 miles (0.32 km) to the south east of Old Turn Junction, where it was later joined by the Worcester and Birmingham Canal. Traffic and water were prevented from moving between the two canals by the Worcester Bar, a situation which was only remedied in 1815 when a stop lock was constructed through the bar. The Birmingham Canal opened in stages from 1769, reaching Aldersley Junction in 1772. It was built as a winding contour canal, ascending through six locks to the Smethwick Summit level, and back down again through another six at Bromford. The level of this summit was reduced by 20 feet (6.1 m) in the 1790s, eliminating six locks, and when Thomas Telford was asked to make improvements to the BCN Main Line, he cut a new main line at a lower level in deep cuttings, avoiding the locks altogether. The new main line also avoided some of the more torturous parts of the route, reducing the length of the canal from 22.6 miles (36.4 km) to 15.4 miles (24.8 km). Telford's work was completed between 1823 and 1838.

From Old Turn Junction, the canal runs in a fairly straight line with towpaths on both banks. It reaches Smethwick Junction after 2.4 miles (3.9 km), where it is still possible to ascend through the three Smethwick locks to follow the old main line. From the top of the flight, a cast-iron aqueduct carries the Engine Arm over the new main line. Old and new routes run parallel for 2.2 miles (3.5 km) to Bromford Junction. Users of the old line can either descend through the three Spon Lane locks to reach the junction, or can cross the new line on Stewart Aqueduct, to follow the old line to Factory Junction. On the new line, Pudding Lane Junction provides access to the Wednesbury Old Canal. The Gower Branch links the new line to the old, and the Netherton Tunnel Branch Canal passes under the old line and through Netherton Tunnel. The three Factory Locks raise the new line through 20 feet (6.1 m) to Factory Junction, and the old canal has a towpath on one bank only.

The canal turns towards the north and passes through the 360-yard (330 m) Coseley Tunnel. The Wednesbury Oak Loop joins the canal at Deepfields Junction, and the main line reverts to the more winding course of a contour canal as it approaches Wolverhampton. At Horseley Fields Junction, the Wyrley and Essington Canal turns to the north east, and the Birmingham main line turns to the north west. It descends through 21 locks, which lower its level by 132 feet (40 m), with the final lock immediately before Aldersley Junction, where the canal joins the Staffordshire and Worcestershire Canal. It is 15.2 miles (24.5 km) from Old Turn Junction along the new main line, and the route has 24 locks.

=== Staffordshire and Worcestershire Canal ===
The Staffordshire and Worcestershire Canal was part of a grand scheme to link the River Trent, the River Severn and the River Mersey. Construction began in 1766, and was completed in 1772. It linked Stourport-on-Severn to Great Haywood on the Trent and Mersey Canal. It was quite profitable, until the Birmingham and Liverpool Junction Canal opened in 1835, when most of the traffic from Birmingham, which had formerly travelled up to Great Haywood, used just 0.5 miles (0.8 km) of the canal from Aldersley Junction to Autherley Junction, and then turned onto the new canal. Tolls for this short length were raised to absurd levels, until the Birmingham and Liverpool Junction Canal and the Birmingham Canal Company promoted a Parliamentary bill in 1836 for a canal flyover and bypass to avoid the Staffordshire and Worcestershire Canal altogether. They conceded defeat and reduced their tolls, resulting in the diversionary route not being built.

Autherley Junction is now the point at which the Shropshire Union Canal leaves the Staffordshire and Worcestershire Canal, as the Birmingham and Liverpool Junction Canal became part of a larger grouping. Beyond the junction, there is a narrow cutting, much of which is not wide enough to allow boats to pass each other, but there are designated locations where the rock has been quarried away to make passing places. The canal is crossed by the M54 motorway as it leaves the suburbs of Wolverhampton. Beyond, it resumes the rambling course of a contour canal, passing through agricultural land. Some of the bridges need extra care, as they are quite low. Near Calf Heath, the short stub of the Hatherton Canal heads eastwards. It is part of an active restoration project, and so may one day be navigable again.

As the canal continues northwards, it reaches the first of twelve locks at Gailey, which drop the canal down to Great Haywood Junction. The M6 motorway passes between Calf Heath reservoir and the two Gailey Reservoirs, which supply water to the canal, and then runs alongside the canal for 0.5 miles (0.8 km), before the canal passes through the centre of Penkridge. To the north of the village, the M6 motorway crosses the canal, while the canal passes along the western edge of Acton Trussell. At Baswich, the canal is just 1.5 miles (2.4 km) from Stafford. There was formerly a link along the River Sow to the town, known as the River Sow Navigation, which is now part of an active restoration project, and has been renamed as the Stafford Riverway Link. The canal then follows the valley of the River Sow, to reach Great Hayward Junction, where the Black Country Ring rejoins the Trent and Mersey Canal. The junction is 21 miles (34 km) from Aldersley Junction.

== Bibliography ==
- Atkins (February 2009). Hatherton Canal Restoration Supplementary Feasibility Report (PDF). Lichfield and Hatherton Canals Restoration Trust. Archived (PDF) from the original on 10 July 2017.
- Cumberlidge, Jane (2009). Inland Waterways of Great Britain (8th Ed.). Imray Laurie Norie and Wilson. ISBN 978-1-84623-010-3.
- Jones, David J. (June 2006). "Stafford Riverway Link" (PDF). Stafford Riverway Link. Archived from the original (PDF) on 8 March 2019.
- Nicholson (2003). Nicholson Guides Vol 3: Birmingham & the heart of England. Harper Collins. ISBN 978-0-00-713666-7.
