= River Dearne =

River in South Yorkshire, England

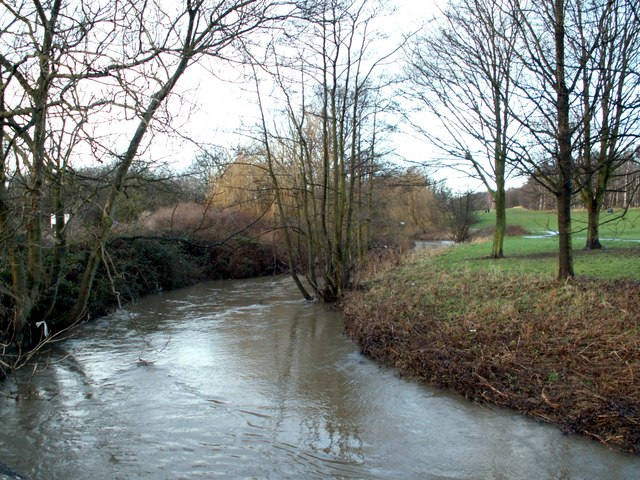
- The River Dearne viewed from the bridge behind Darton Post Office.

Location
- Country: England
- Counties: South Yorkshire; West Riding of Yorkshire; Yorkshire (historical)

Physical characteristics
- Source
  - location: Birdsedge nr Denby Dale
  - coordinates: 53°33′52″N 1°42′37″W
  - elevation: 328 metres (1,076 ft)
- Mouth
  - location: River Don near Conisbrough
  - coordinates: 53°29′39″N 1°14′34″W
  - elevation: 17 metres (56 ft)
- Length: 51.9 km (32.2 mi)
- Basin size: 310.8 km^{2} (120.0 sq mi)

The River Dearne in South Yorkshire, England flows roughly east for more than 30 kilometres (19 mi), from its source just inside West Yorkshire. It flows through Denby Dale, Clayton West, Haigh, Darton, Barnsley, Darfield, Wath upon Dearne, Bolton on Dearne, Adwick upon Dearne and Mexborough to its confluence with the River Don at Denaby Main. Its main tributary is the River Dove, which joins it at Darfield. The river was one of those affected by the 2007 United Kingdom floods.

The course of the river is accessible to walkers as the Dearne Way, a long distance footpath from Dearne Head to the river's junction with the Don. Places of interest along the Dearne include the Yorkshire Sculpture Park at West Bretton, and Monk Bretton Priory. The Dearne Valley below Barnsley is a regeneration area.

The river has been subject to channel engineering to ease the problem of flooding. A new channel was constructed near its mouth in the 1950s, as the old route had been affected by mining subsidence. Washlands, which can be progressively flooded as water levels rise, were constructed in the 1960s and 1970s. A flood relief channel and a regulator to restrict the flow was built at Bolton upon Dearne. During the 2007 United Kingdom floods, the washlands filled to capacity but the regulator could not be operated as it had been vandalised.

Industrialisation caused the river and the Dearne and Dove Canal, to become grossly polluted in the early nineteenth century and fish populations died. The West Riding River Board tried to address the problems in 1896 with limited success and much of the river remained dead until the 1980s, when industrial effluents were removed before they were discharged and improvements were made to sewage treatment. Despite setbacks, fish populations had been partially reinstated by the early 1990s. Channel engineering was carried out at Denaby in the 1990s, to re-introduce bends, deep pools and shallow gravel riffles, to assist fish spawning. In June 2015, salmon were reported in the river for the first time in 150 years.

== Route ==
The river rises just below the 330-metre (1,080 ft) contour west of Birdsedge. Within around 1.9 miles (3 km), it reaches the A635 Barnsley Road bridge at Denby Dale, by which time it has dropped below the 175-metre (574 ft) contour, and its flow has been swelled by several springs and the output of Park Dike. Below the bridge, Munchcliffe Beck joins near a large millpond, which supplied mills at Denby Dale. Beyond the mills, the river passes under a railway viaduct near Denby Dale railway station. The curved viaduct with 21 tall arches was built by the Lancashire and Yorkshire Railway in 1884.

The river flows to the north east closely following the A636 road. It is joined by Thorpe Dike at Kitchenroyd. It passes through Scissett and west of Clayton West where it is crossed by the Kirklees Light Railway. Park Gate Dike swells the flow, before a double-arched skew bridge built in the early 19th century carries the A636 over the channel. Nearby is a hump-backed packhorse bridge with a single arch, probably built in the previous century, after which the river turns to the east to pass the upper and lower lakes in a channel from where it feed the lakes in the Yorkshire Sculpture Park. Bretton Hall lies to the north. The river turns south at the dam of the lower lake and passes over weirs before picking up the outflow from the lakes, after which the 75-metre (246 ft) contour is crossed.

Next it turns to the south east and passes under the A637 road, the M1 motorway and the sliproads which form part of Junction 38, to reach Darton. The Cawthorne Dike joins from the west as it turns to the east and passes under the Wakefield to Barnsley railway line. The B6428 crosses on Barugh Bridge, a single-span bridge made of rock-faced stone, which bears the date 1850 on the north-west buttress. As the river approaches Barnsley, the remains of the Barnsley Canal follow it on the south bank. Beyond the A61 Old Mill Lane bridge there was a mill, after which an aqueduct carried the canal over the river. Two more road bridges follow, the second of which carries the A633 Grange Lane. Just before the bridge is Priory Mill, a thirteenth-century mill which was heavily rebuilt by Sir William Armyne in 1635, and further remodelled in the nineteenth century. It was powered by a leat from the river, which supplied internal water wheels. Water from the leat was also channelled to Monk Bretton Priory, where it flushed the kitchens and the reredorter. Next there are two former railway bridges which now carry footpaths. Soon sections of the disused Dearne and Dove Canal run parallel to the river, and after passing under two more railway bridges, the course turns to the south to reach Darfield, below which the River Dove joins from the west. The river turns to the east again, passing to the north east of a series of lakes which form the Dearne Ings and Old Moor washlands. On the opposite side of the channel are the Bolton Ings washlands, which cover 110 acres (45 ha) and have been acquired by the Royal Society for the Protection of Birds (RSPB). In 2011, the site was in its early stages of development, but the reedbeds have attracted spoonbills and avocets, and are expected to act as a breeding ground for bitterns in due course. After the washlands, the river flows to the north of Wath upon Dearne, and to the south of Bolton on Dearne.

The railway to Bolton on Dearne station crosses, after which the river is flanked by the disused Bolton Common tip on the south bank. From the village of Adwick upon Dearne, which is a little further to the south, Harlington Road crosses the river at Adwick Bridge, a grade II listed twin-arched bridge built of sandstone around 1800. Denaby Ings nature reserve is separated from the river by a railway embankment on the north bank. The river sweeps round to the south to join the River Don just below Mexborough Low Lock, where Mexborough New Cut on the River Don Navigation rejoins the river. In 1903 the junction of the river with the Don was adjacent to the railway sidings of the Cadeby Main colliery, but by 1930 it had been moved further upstream, much closer to its present location.

There is a long-distance path which follows the course of the river from its source to its junction with the River Don. It is known as the Dearne Way, and the paths are marked on current editions of the Ordnance Survey maps. The path is around 30 miles (48 km) long and can be walked in 12 to 16 hours. Walkers who start at the source descend through 1,368 feet (417 m) over the length of the walk.

== Flood defences ==
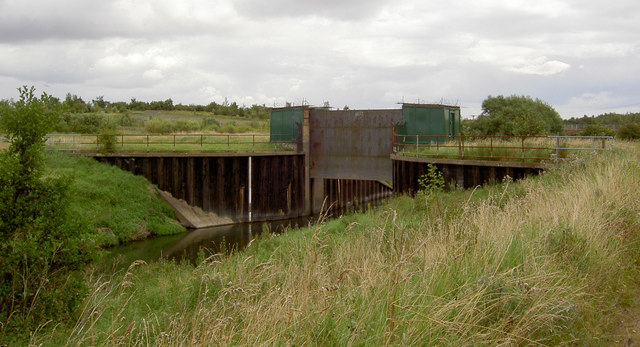
The river regulator at Bolton upon Dearne may be removed as part of a flood risk management strategy.

By the 1950s, the course of the river near its mouth had been affected by subsidence from coal mining, and the lowering of the channel resulted in much of the surrounding land being regularly flooded. In order to alleviate the problem and restore the gradient of the channel at this point, a new channel was constructed on the south side of the railway embankment, from near Harlington to the River Don. The old channel can still be seen on the north side of the embankment, and connects to the Denaby Ings Nature Reserve.

As part of a comprehensive assessment of flood risks caused by the River Don and its tributaries, the River Dearne Improvement Scheme was implemented between 1963 and 1973. It was recognised that simple enlargement of the river channel would not provide a satisfactory solution, as it would just move the problem to the River Don, and therefore a series of washlands were created, which could be progressively flooded if required, without affecting centres of population. Near the mouth of the river, Dearne Mouth washland, which is now known as the Denaby Ings Nature Reserve, was created in 1963, and a manually operated sluice allowed the flow of the river to be diverted through the floodbank and into the washland when there were high levels at the junction with the River Don. The sluice was rebuilt in 1973. Additional washlands were created at Harlington and North Ings, and the river was straightened and realigned.

Further upriver, a flood relief channel was built at Bolton upon Dearne, and more washlands were formed between Wath railway bridge and Adwick bridge. The Bolton Ings and Old Moor washlands were next to be created, to be followed by those at Wombwell Ings, where the River Dove joins the Dearne, Darfield, Houghton and Cudworth. Some of the storage capacity was lost as a result of mining schemes, and a regulator was installed at Bolton in 1972, allowing the flow to be restricted by a sluice gate. During the flooding in 2007, all of the washlands filled to capacity, although the Bolton regulator could not be operated as it had been vandalised. Some damage to the Houghton washlands resulted from the extremely high water levels, which overtopped the banks and caused erosion to take place. Following the floods, a reassessment of the function of the regulators was carried out, and in view of the costs of maintaining them, the Environment Agency intend to remove them once some reconfiguration of the river channel has been completed. This work will ensure that the washlands fill and empty at the appropriate points in a flood cycle.

== Water quality ==
In the late 1700s, the river held good populations of fish. Industrial development of the valley consisted of several deep coal mines, but they were fairly small, and did not significantly pollute the river. There were collieries at Smithies, Honeywell, Queens Ground and Mount Osborne. The opening of the Dearne and Dove Canal in 1810 had serious impacts on the river, as it provided a way to transport the coal to Sheffield and Rotherham, where it was used in the steelworks. This led to the rapid development of more and larger collieries. The population grew rapidly, but it was housed in small villages near the pits. With no urban infrastructure, sewage polluted the river, as did the industrial discharges from the mines.

Parts of the upper river were well suited to the woollen trade, and mills developed in the 19th century, at Denby Dale, Scissett and Clayton West. The valley of the upper river is quite narrow, and housing was provided by building terraces, which often backed on to the river. Again, sewage ended up in the river, as did the effluent from processing the wool, which included caustic washing agents and dyes. Water used in washing was returned to the river without adequate cooling, and the temperature rose. As early as 1896, the West Riding River Board was working hard to improve the situation, and achieved limited success by 1902, when they produced a report. They identified 44 small sewage treatment plants, none of which treated the sewage adequately, and noted that the river was "much polluted by domestic sewage and by untreated or partially treated trade refuse." By the early 1900s, the river was lifeless between Barnsley and the Don, with fish unable to survive in the cocktail of chemicals. The River Dove was also lifeless, although the Cawthorne Dyke and several other small tributaries managed to retain populations of brown trout.

The situation had not improved by the 1960s, when the Yorkshire Ouse River Board noted that industrial waste from the mining, paper making, brewing and textile industries was being dumping into the river without any treatment. Pressure from the Board and from local authorities based along the river resulted in some treatment being carried out, but by 1974 much of the river was still rated as Class E on the six-point water quality scale, which indicated it was of poor quality, with some parts rated as Class F, meaning that they grossly polluted with little or no life. Nevertheless, small pockets of fish began to appear. A small population of brown trout had survived in the upper 1.5 miles (2.4 km) of the river, but could not proceed downstream due to dams erected for the woollen mills. Moth-proofing agents were released by the mills into the water, which were highly toxic to fish, and although the discharge of these chemicals ceased in 1979, when they were routed to a sewer for treatment, the problem did not immediately go away, as the chemicals continued to seep into the river from land which had been contaminated by them for another ten years. Any progress with the re-establishment of fish stocks was destroyed by a series of releases of pollutants into the river during the 1970s and 1980s.

=== Improvements ===
By 1987, water quality had improved sufficiently to try restocking the upper river, and large numbers of yearling trout were released into the river in April. A fish survey carried out by the Yorkshire Water Authority a year later showed that many of these were surviving. By 1992, there was evidence that the fish were breeding in the river, and naturally bred brown trout were found between Denby Dale and Clayton West in 1994, for the first time in over 100 years. The trout population in the upper Dearne was declared to be self-sustaining by 1996.

The river below Clayton West ceases to be a shallow, fast-flowing watercourse, and consists of deeper pools with a slower flow, which is suitable for various coarse fish as well as trout. By 1974, a modest improvement in water quality had been achieved by treatment of industrial effluent, and some fish managed to exist below the weir at the Star Paper Mill in Barnsley. The weir helped to oxygenate the water, and most of the fish had been washed downstream from Cannon Hall and Bretton Lakes. During flood conditions, many of the population would be washed further downstream, to be replaced by others from the lakes. A survey in 1982 found gudgeon, minnow and three-spined stickleback, which had increased by 1985, and over 10,000 coarse fish were released as part of a restocking programme. However, most of these were killed by serious pollution incidents that affected the river in 1987 and 1988, and incidents continued for a further three years. The sewage treatment works at Darton and Lundwood, on either side of Barnsley, were largely responsible.

Discharges from the Darton sewage treatment works contained residues from dyes used by a local carpet manufacturer, which reached the works by a foul sewer, but could not be adequately treated by the existing processes. As a result, the final effluent was a deep red colour, and was a major factor in the poor biochemical oxygen demand ratings for the river. Major improvements, including new primary settlement tanks and tertiary treatment lagoons, were made to the treatment works, and the carpet manufacturers installed facilities to treat their effluent before it was discharged to the sewer. By 1994, fish were again appearing below the Star Paper Mill weir, and Yorkshire Water and the Environment Agency carried out another fish restocking programme.

Improvements to water quality through Barnsley highlighted the fact that fish populations did not exist below the discharge from the Lundwood sewage treatment works to the east of Barnsley. As the population of Barnsley had increased, the volume of effluent received by the works had increased without a corresponding increase in its ability to treat it. In addition, the outfall reached the river along a 440-yard (400 m) stretch of the Cliffe Bridge Dyke, which had suffered from subsidence. This resulted in slow movement along the dyke, which sometimes caused the effluent to become septic before it reached the main channel. A major programme of refurbishment was carried out at the works between 1997 and 1998, to improve the quality of discharge. The fish populations on the lower river fluctuated, as a result of pollution incidents on the middle river, but by 1994, chub and dace were clearly breeding in the river. Breeding was assisted by re-engineering of the channel at Pastures Road, Denaby, which had been straightened in the 1960s after it was affected by subsidence. A series of bends were created, which encourage the formation of deep pools and shallow gravel riffles. These features are needed by dace and barbel for successful spawning, and prevent young fish from being washed downstream in flood conditions. Water quality has continued to improve, and the lower Dearne has become an important venue for angling.

Further improvements to the Lundwood sewage treatment works began in 2007 to enable it to comply with the Freshwater Fish Directive, and although the site was inundated during the floods of 2007, the scheme, which cost £8 million, was completed in 2008. To celebrate the opening of the new works, the poet Ian McMillan was asked to run a poetry workshop at Littleworth Grange Primary Learning Centre, where children completed a poem about water treatment for which he supplied the first two lines. In June 2015, the Environment Agency announced that salmon had returned to the Dearne for the first time in 150 years. This follows the opening of a fish ladder at Sprotborough weir in 2014.

=== Assessment ===
The Environment Agency measure the water quality of the river systems in England. Each is given an overall ecological status, which may be one of five levels: high, good, moderate, poor and bad. There are several components that are used to determine this, including biological status, which looks at the quantity and varieties of invertebrates, angiosperms and fish. Chemical status, which compares the concentrations of various chemicals against known safe concentrations, is rated good or fail. The Dearne and several of its tributaries are designated as "heavily modified", which means that the channels have been altered by human activity, and the criteria for this designation are defined by the Water Framework Directive.

The water quality of the Dearne and its tributaries was as follows in 2019.

Section	Ecological Status	Chemical Status	Length	Catchment	Channel
Dearne from Source to Bentley Brook	Moderate	Fail	8.4 miles (13.5 km)	11.63 square miles (30.1 km^{2})	heavily modified
Bentley Brook from Source to River Dearne	Moderate	Fail	5.0 miles (8.0 km)	5.37 square miles (13.9 km^{2})	
Dearne from Bentley Brook to Cawthorne Dyke	Moderate	Fail	5.7 miles (9.2 km)	5.40 square miles (14.0 km^{2})	heavily modified
Cawthorne Dyke from Source to River Dearne	Poor	Fail	7.9 miles (12.7 km)	10.43 square miles (27.0 km^{2})	
Dearne from Cawthorne Dyke to Lundwood STW	Moderate	Fail	6.0 miles (9.7 km)	8.65 square miles (22.4 km^{2})	heavily modified
Cudworth Dyke from Source to River Dearne	Poor	Fail	5.1 miles (8.2 km)	13.27 square miles (34.4 km^{2})	
Grimethorpe Dike from Source to River Dearne	Moderate	Fail	4.6 miles (7.4 km)	5.17 square miles (13.4 km^{2})	heavily modified
Dearne from Lundwood to River Dove	Moderate	Fail	5.8 miles (9.3 km)	5.37 square miles (13.9 km^{2})	heavily modified
Dearne from Darfield STW to River Don	Moderate	Fail	12.1 miles (19.5 km)	16.13 square miles (41.8 km^{2})	heavily modified

Like most rivers in the UK, the chemical status changed from good to fail in 2019, due to the presence of polybrominated diphenyl ethers (PBDE), perfluorooctane sulphonate (PFOS), mercury compounds and cypermethrin, none of which had previously been included in the assessment.

== Points of interest ==
Point	Coordinates (Links to map resources)	OS Grid Ref	Notes
Dearne Head	53.5647°N 1.7149°W	SE189076	source
A635 bridge, Denby Dale	53.5702°N 1.6672°W	SE221082	
Junction with Park Gate Dike	53.5955°N 1.6300°W	SE245110	
Bretton Country Park weirs	53.6085°N 1.5627°W	SE290125	
Junction with Cawthorne Dike	53.5771°N 1.5236°W	SE316090	
A633 Grange Lane Bridge	53.5515°N 1.4398°W	SE372062	Barnsley
Junction with River Dove	53.5287°N 1.3686°W	SE419037	Darfield
Junction with River Don	53.4942°N 1.2425°W	SK503999	mouth

== See also ==
- Rivers of the United Kingdom

== Bibliography ==
- Firth, Christopher (1997). Domesday to the dawn of the New Millennium – 900 years of the Don fishery. Environment Agency. Archived (PDF) from the original on 17 July 2019. (This is available online at The Don Catchment Rivers Trust. Page numbers refer to the pdf file).
