= Adwick upon Dearne =

Village and civil parish in South Yorkshire, England

Coordinates: 53.50°N 1.29°W

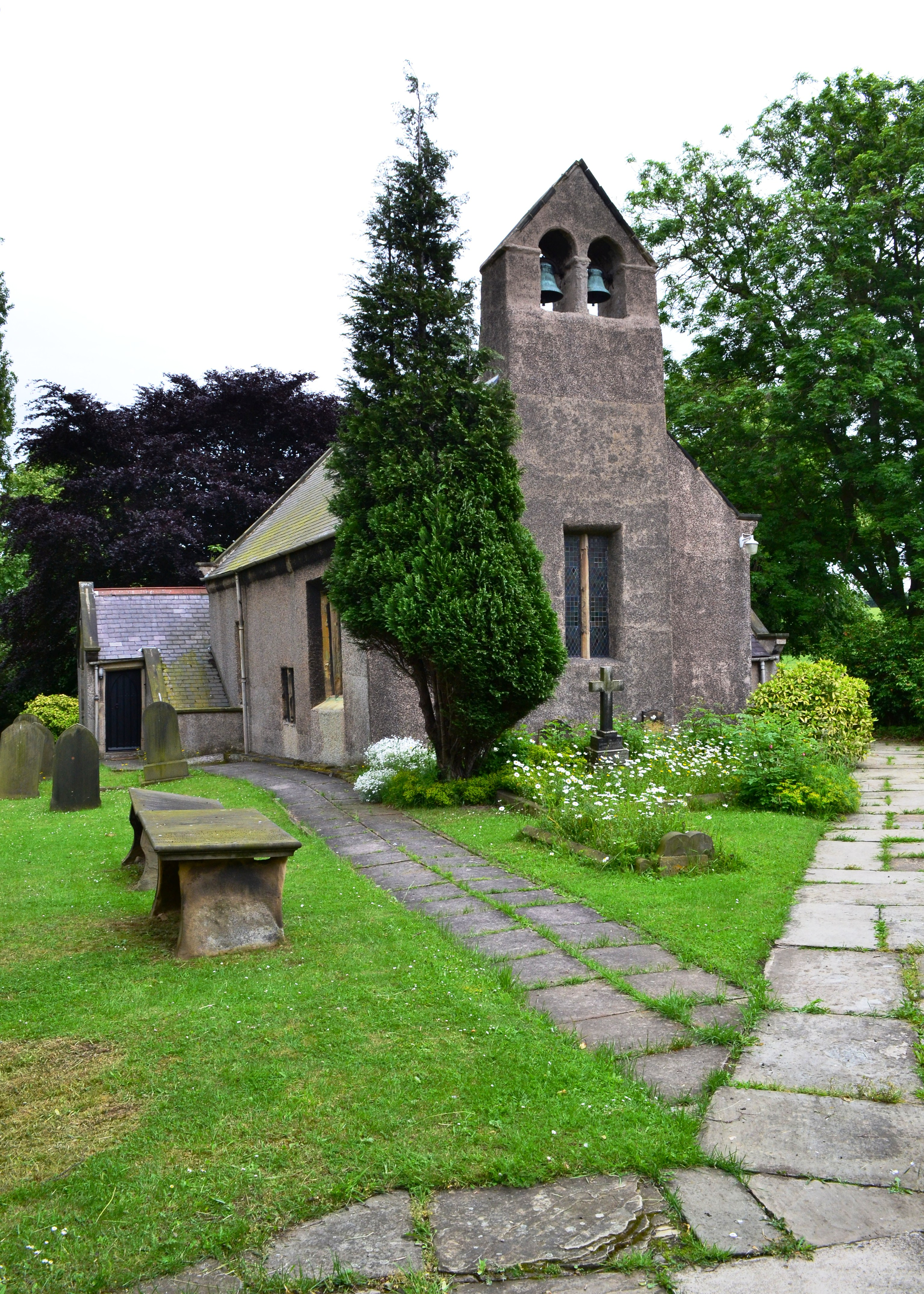
- The church of St John the Baptist

- Location within South Yorkshire
- Population: 333 (2011 census)
- OS grid reference: SE4701
- Civil parish: Adwick upon Dearne
- Metropolitan borough: Doncaster
- Metropolitan county: South Yorkshire
- Region: Yorkshire and the Humber
- Country: England
- Sovereign state: United Kingdom
- Post town: MEXBOROUGH
- Postcode district: S64
- Dialling code: 01709
- Police: South Yorkshire
- Fire: South Yorkshire
- Ambulance: Yorkshire
- UK Parliament: Doncaster North

Adwick upon Dearne is a small village and civil parish on the A6023 road near Mexborough.

The Adwick upon Dearne civil parish covers Adwick itself and a small part of northern Mexborough. The population of the civil parish as of the 2011 census was 333.

It lies near Mexborough and is in the borough of Doncaster.

The Church of St John is a Grade II* listed building. It dates to the 12th century with later additions and alterations, notably when the chancel arch was replaced in 1910.

The name Adwick derives from the Old English addawīc meaning 'Adda's trading settlement'.

== See also ==
- Listed buildings in Adwick upon Dearne
