= List of mills in Calderdale =

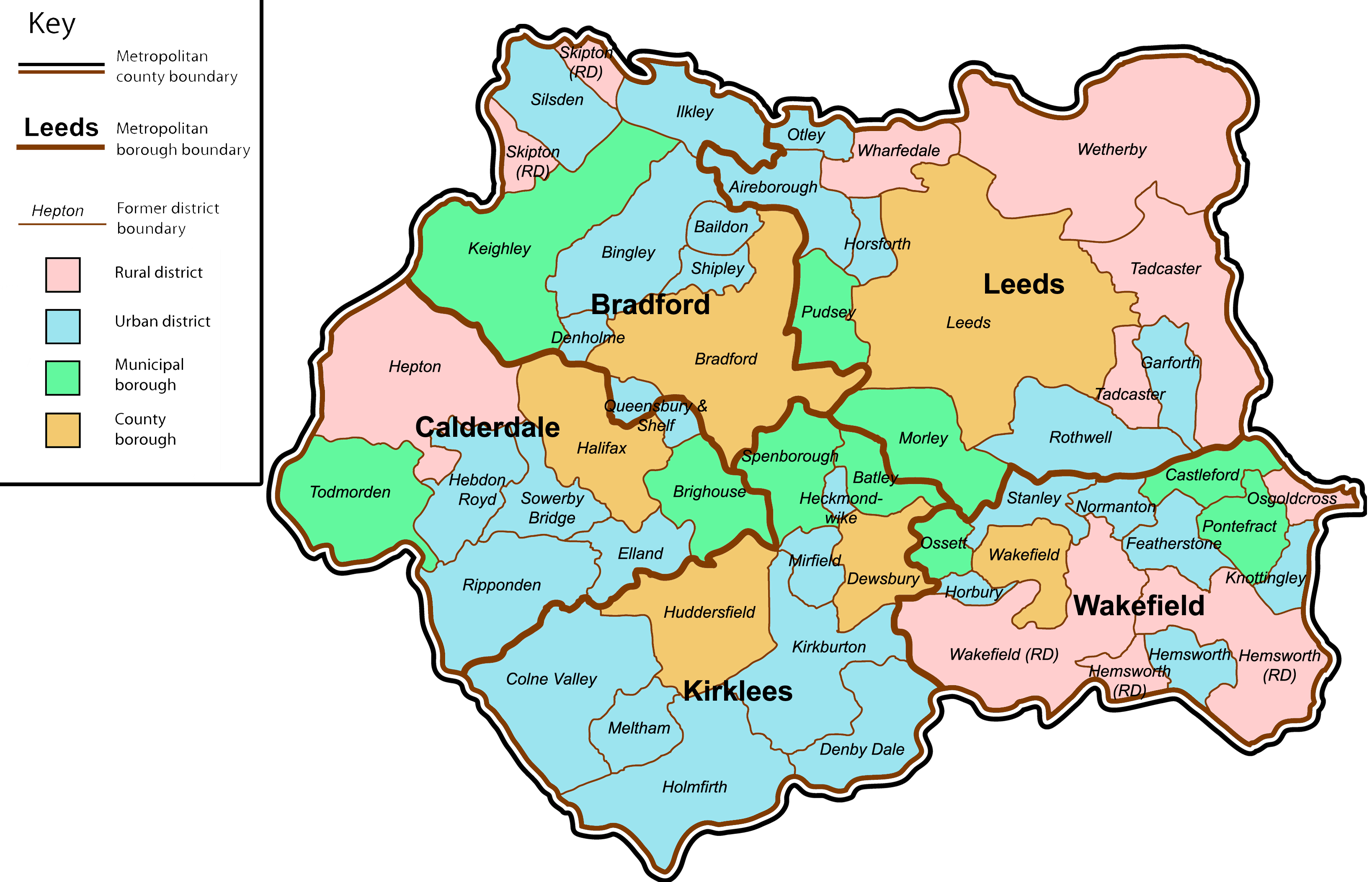

This is a list of the wool, cotton and other textile mills in Calderdale, England: this is Halifax, Brighouse and Todmorden with Elland, Hebden Royd and Ripponden.

== Barkisland (Ripponden) ==
Name	Architect	Location	Built	Demolished	Served (Years)
Barkisland Mills		Barkisland (Ripponden), SE 0655 1972 53°40′26″N 1°54′08″W			
	Notes: National Building Register:62973: (B)				
Bowers Mills		Barkisland (Ripponden), SE 0695 2015 53°40′40″N 1°53′47″W			
	Notes: National Building Register:62742: (A)				
Chapel Field Mill		Barkisland (Ripponden), SE 0408 1971 53°40′26″N 1°56′23″W			
	Notes: National Building Register:62961: (B)				
Firth House Mills		Barkisland (Ripponden), SE 0633 1829 53°39′40″N 1°54′20″W			
	Notes: National Building Register:62975: (B)				
Krumlin Mills		Barkisland (Ripponden), SE 0545 1835 53°39′42″N 1°55′08″W			
	Notes: National Building Register:62966: (B)				
Ripponden Mill		Barkisland (Ripponden), SE 0400 1972 53°40′26″N 1°56′27″W			
	Notes: National Building Register:62960: (B)				

== Clifton (Brighouse) ==
Name	Architect	Location	Built	Demolished	Served (Years)
Bailliff Bridge Mill		Clifton (Brighouse), SE 149 251 53°43′19″N 1°46′32″W			
	Notes: National Building Register:62847: (C)				
Clifton Mills		Clifton (Brighouse),			
	Notes: (see Bailliff Bridge Mill)				
Grove Mills		Clifton (Brighouse), SE 1499 2275 53°42′03″N 1°46′28″W			
	Notes: National Building Register:62861: (B)				
Kirklees Mills		Clifton (Brighouse), SE 1699 2195 53°41′37″N 1°44′39″W	late 18th century		
	Notes: National Building Register:62943: (B); Grade II listed building				
Littlejohn Mill		Clifton (Brighouse), SE 1498 2295 53°42′10″N 1°46′28″W			
	Notes: National Building Register:62920: (B)				

== Cliviger (Todmorden) ==
Name	Architect	Location	Built	Demolished	Served (Years)
Caldervale Mill		Cliviger (Todmorden), SD 9080 2635 53°44′00″N 2°08′27″W			
	Notes: National Building Register:62163: (B)				
Cornholme Mills		Cliviger (Todmorden), SD 9070 2635 53°44′00″N 2°08′33″W			
	Notes: National Building Register:62164: (C)				
Glen Dye Works		Cliviger (Todmorden), SD 9081 2661 53°44′09″N 2°08′27″W			
	Notes: National Building Register:62162: (B)				
Portsmouth Mill		Cliviger (Todmorden), SD 8995 2635 53°44′00″N 2°09′14″W			
	Notes: National Building Register:62161: (B)				

== Erringden (Hebden Royd) ==
Name	Architect	Location	Built	Demolished	Served (Years)
Cragg Mill		Erringden (Hebden Royd), SE 0040 2370 53°42′35″N 1°59′44″W			
	Notes: National Building Register:62693: (C)				
Hebble End Dyeworks		Erringden (Hebden Royd), SD 9903 2712 53°44′26″N 2°00′58″W			
	Notes: National Building Register:62237: (B)				
Holme End Dyeworks		Erringden (Hebden Royd), SE 0039 2640 53°44′02″N 1°59′44″W			
	Notes: National Building Register:62689: (B)				
Hoo Hole Mill Dyeworks		Erringden (Hebden Royd), SE 0085 2535 53°43′28″N 1°59′19″W			
	Notes: National Building Register:62692: (B)				
Mill		Erringden (Hebden Royd), SD 9895 2715 53°44′27″N 2°01′03″W			
	Notes: National Building Register:62242: (B)				
Rudclough Mill		Erringden (Hebden Royd), SD 9975 2320 53°42′19″N 2°00′19″W			
	Notes: National Building Register:62260: (C)				
Vale Mill		Erringden (Hebden Royd),			
	Notes: (see Rudclough Mill)				

== Halifax ==
Name	Architect	Location	Built	Demolished	Served (Years)
Albany Works		Halifax, SE 0765 2579 53°43′42″N 1°53′08″W			
	Notes: National Building Register:62747: (B)				
Albion Mills		Halifax, SE 0976 2485 53°43′12″N 1°51′13″W			
	Notes: National Building Register:62795: (B)				
Albion Mills		Halifax, SE 0985 2504 53°43′18″N 1°51′08″W			
	Notes: National Building Register:62913: (B)				
Arden Works		Halifax, SE 0769 2441 53°42′58″N 1°53′06″W			
	Notes: National Building Register:62753: (B)				
Beech Hill Mills		Halifax, SE 0853 2555 53°43′35″N 1°52′20″W			
	Notes: National Building Register:62769: (B)				
Billinghay Mills		Halifax, SE 0768 2462 53°43′05″N 1°53′06″W			
	Notes: National Building Register:62751: (B)				
Bowling Dyke Dyeworks		Halifax, SE 0925 2572 53°43′40″N 1°51′41″W			
	Notes: National Building Register:62790: (B)				
Brunswick Mills		Halifax, SE 0880 2470 53°43′07″N 1°52′05″W			
	Notes: National Building Register:62781: (B)				
Bull Close Lane Works		Halifax, SE 090 249 53°43′14″N 1°51′54″W			
	Notes: National Building Register:944: (B)				
Clarence Mills		Halifax, SE 0808 2555 53°43′35″N 1°52′44″W			
	Notes: National Building Register:62768: (B)				
Clark Bridge Mills		Halifax, SE 0991 2525 53°43′25″N 1°51′05″W			
	Notes: National Building Register:62794: (B)				
Clay Pits Mills		Halifax, SE 0748 2561 53°43′37″N 1°53′17″W			
	Notes: National Building Register:62748: (B)				
Craven Edge Mills		Halifax, SE 0814 2497 53°43′16″N 1°52′41″W			
	Notes: National Building Register:62776: (B)				
Dunkirk Mills		Halifax, SE 0745 2450 53°43′01″N 1°53′19″W			
	Notes: In 1907 a Worsted mill. National Building Register:62752: (B)				
Eagle Mills		Halifax, SE 0969 2535 53°43′28″N 1°51′17″W			
	Notes: National Building Register:62793: (B)				
Fenton Road Works		Halifax, SE 0775 2445 53°42′59″N 1°53′03″W			
	Notes: National Building Register:62754: (B)				
Fenton Works		Halifax, SE 0776 2440 53°42′57″N 1°53′02″W			
	Notes: National Building Register:62755: (B)				
Hanson Lane Mill		Halifax, SE 0820 2536 53°43′28″N 1°52′38″W			
	Notes: National Building Register:63899: (C)				
Keighley Mill		Halifax, SE 0889 2535 53°43′28″N 1°52′00″W			
	Notes: National Building Register:62778: (B)				
Lee Mills		Halifax, SE 0865 2585 53°43′44″N 1°52′13″W			
	Notes: National Building Register:62766: (B)				
Livingstone Mills		Halifax, SE 0800 2526 53°43′25″N 1°52′49″W			
	Notes: National Building Register:62771: (B)				
Miall Street Mills		Halifax, SE 0808 2565 53°43′38″N 1°52′44″W			
	Notes: National Building Register:62768: (B)				
Mill		Halifax, SE 0933 2563 53°43′37″N 1°51′36″W			
	Notes: National Building Register:62791: (B)				
Mill		Halifax, SE 0800 2520 53°43′23″N 1°52′49″W			
	Notes: National Building Register:62772: (B)				
Mill		Halifax, SE 0805 2505 53°43′18″N 1°52′46″W			
	Notes: National Building Register:62775: (B)				
Pellon Lane Mills		Halifax, SE 0885 2549 53°43′33″N 1°52′02″W			
	Notes: National Building Register:62777: (B)				
Queen’s Road Mills		Halifax, SE 0791 2510 53°43′20″N 1°52′54″W			
	Notes: National Building Register:62773: (B)				
Raglan Works		Halifax, SE 0850 2541 53°43′30″N 1°52′22″W			
	Notes: National Building Register:62770: (B)				
Riding Hall		Halifax,			
	Notes: (see Clark Bridge Mills)				
Royal Mills		Halifax, SE 0875 2509 53°43′20″N 1°52′08″W			
	Notes: National Building Register:62779: (B)				
Ryburne Mill		Halifax, SE 0782 2535 53°43′28″N 1°52′59″W			
	Notes: National Building Register:62749: (B)				
Scarborough Mill		Halifax, SE 0811 2429 53°42′54″N 1°52′43″W			
	Notes: National Building Register:62782: (B)				
Spring Hall Works		Halifax, SE 0720 2495 53°43′15″N 1°53′33″W			
	Notes: National Building Register:62750: (B)				
Stone Dam Mill		Halifax, SE 0969 2538 53°43′29″N 1°51′17″W	c.1836	in use	
	Notes: National Building Register:62947: Grade II listed building. Now a furniture store. (A)				
Trafalgar Works		Halifax,			
	Notes: (see Scarborough Mill)				
Wellington Mills		Halifax, SE 0969 2545 53°43′31″N 1°51′17″W			
	Notes: National Building Register:62792: (A)				
West End Dyeworks		Halifax, SE 0800 2501 53°43′17″N 1°52′49″W			
	Notes: National Building Register:62774: (B)				
West Grove Mill		Halifax, SE 0880 2500 53°43′17″N 1°52′05″W			
	Notes: National Building Register:62780: (B)				

== Heptonstall (Hebden Royd; Heptonstall) ==
Name	Architect	Location	Built	Demolished	Served (Years)
Beehive Works (HR)		Heptonstall (Hebden Royd; Heptonstall), SD 9889 2715 53°44′27″N 2°01′06″W			
	Notes: National Building Register:62226: (B)				
Bob Mill (H)		Heptonstall (Hebden Royd; Heptonstall), SD 974 282 53°45′01″N 2°02′27″W			
	Notes: National Building Register:258: (B)				
Bridge Mill (H)		Heptonstall (Hebden Royd; Heptonstall), SD 988 290 53°45′26″N 2°01′11″W	c.1830		
	Notes: National Building Register:222: (B)				
Brunswick Mill (HR)		Heptonstall (Hebden Royd; Heptonstall), SD 989 271 53°44′25″N 2°01′05″W			
	Notes: National Building Register:268: (B)				
Calder Mill (HR)		Heptonstall (Hebden Royd; Heptonstall), SD 9875 2719 53°44′28″N 2°01′14″W			
	Notes: National Building Register:62225: (B)				
Everest Works (HR)		Heptonstall (Hebden Royd; Heptonstall), SD 9895 2725 53°44′30″N 2°01′03″W			
	Notes: National Building Register:62247: (B)				
Gibson Mill (Lord Holme Mill)		Heptonstall (Hebden Royd; Heptonstall), SD 9731 2986 53°45′52″N 2°02′33″W	early/mid 19th century		
	Notes: Grade II listed building				
Hanging Royd Mill (HR)		Heptonstall (Hebden Royd; Heptonstall), SD 9932 2760 53°44′41″N 2°00′42″W			
	Notes: National Building Register:62246: (C)				
Hanging Royd Works		Heptonstall (Hebden Royd; Heptonstall),			
	Notes: (see Hanging Royd Mill)				
Hebden Works (HR)		Heptonstall (Hebden Royd; Heptonstall), SD 9936 2755 53°44′40″N 2°00′40″W			
	Notes: National Building Register:62235: (B)				
Higher Lumb Mill (H)		Heptonstall (Hebden Royd; Heptonstall), SD 9765 2821 53°45′01″N 2°02′14″W			
	Notes: National Building Register:62219: (C)				
Hudson‘s Mill(H)		Heptonstall (Hebden Royd; Heptonstall), SD 9650 2819 53°45′00″N 2°03′16″W			
	Notes: National Building Register:62259: (C)				
Jack Bridge Mill(H)		Heptonstall (Hebden Royd; Heptonstall), SD 9625 2825 53°45′02″N 2°03′30″W			
	Notes: National Building Register:62208: (C)				
Lee Mill(H)		Heptonstall (Hebden Royd; Heptonstall), SD 9922 2842 53°45′08″N 2°00′48″W			
	Notes: National Building Register:62230: (C)				
Linden Works (HR)		Heptonstall (Hebden Royd; Heptonstall), SD 9919 2755 53°44′40″N 2°00′50″W			
	Notes: National Building Register:62234: (B)				
Lord Holme Mill		Heptonstall (Hebden Royd; Wadsworth),			
	Notes: (see Gibson Mill)				
Lower Lumb Mill(H)		Heptonstall (Hebden Royd; Heptonstall), SD 977 282 53°45′01″N 2°02′11″W			
	Notes: National Building Register:220: (B)				
Lower Slater Ing Mill		Heptonstall (Hebden Royd; Heptonstall),			
	Notes: (see Lower Lumb Mill)				
Melbourne Works (HR)		Heptonstall (Hebden Royd; Heptonstall), SD 9901 2729 53°44′31″N 2°00′59″W			
	Notes: National Building Register:62265: (B)				
Regent Works (HR)		Heptonstall (Hebden Royd; Heptonstall), SD 9920 2749 53°44′38″N 2°00′49″W			
	Notes: National Building Register:62267: (A)				
Royds Mill (HR)		Heptonstall (Hebden Royd; Heptonstall), SD 9920 2740 53°44′35″N 2°00′49″W			
	Notes: National Building Register:62236: (B)				
Salem Mills (HR)		Heptonstall (Hebden Royd; Heptonstall), SD 9896 2719 53°44′28″N 2°01′02″W			
	Notes: National Building Register:62227: (C)				
Salem Mills (HR)		Heptonstall (Hebden Royd; Heptonstall), SD 9901 2712 53°44′26″N 2°00′59″W			
	Notes: National Building Register:62264: (B)				
Salliord Works		Heptonstall (Hebden Royd; Heptonstall),			
	Notes: (see Melbourne Works)				
Slater Ing Mill		Heptonstall (Hebden Royd; Heptonstall),			
	Notes: (see Higher Lumb Mill)				
Waterside Mill(H)		Heptonstall (Hebden Royd; Heptonstall), SD 986 272 53°44′28″N 2°01′22″W			
	Notes: National Building Register:224: (B)				

== Hipperholme cum Brighouse (Brighouse) ==
Name	Architect	Location	Built	Demolished	Served (Years)
Albert Mills		Hipperholme cum Brighouse (Brighouse), SE 1475 2275 53°42′03″N 1°46′41″W			
	Notes: National Building Register:62855: (B)				
Alexandra Mill		Hipperholme cum Brighouse (Brighouse), SE 1459 2262 53°41′59″N 1°46′50″W			
	Notes: National Building Register:62949: (C)				
Bailiff Bridge Mill		Hipperholme cum Brighouse (Brighouse), SE 147 253 53°43′26″N 1°46′43″W			
	Notes: National Building Register:846: (B)				
Bridge Road Works		Hipperholme cum Brighouse (Brighouse), SE 1439 2269 53°42′02″N 1°47′01″W			
	Notes: National Building Register:62853: (B)				
Britannia Mills		Hipperholme cum Brighouse (Brighouse),			
	Notes: (see Albert Mills)				
Broad Holme Mill		Hipperholme cum Brighouse (Brighouse), SE 1465 2265 53°42′00″N 1°46′46″W			
	Notes: National Building Register:62854: (B)				
Cranbrook Mills		Hipperholme cum Brighouse (Brighouse), SE 1449 2669 53°44′11″N 1°46′55″W			
	Notes: National Building Register:62843: (B)				
Ganny Mill		Hipperholme cum Brighouse (Brighouse), SE 1420 2281 53°42′05″N 1°47′11″W			
	Notes: National Building Register:62851: (B)				
Mill		Hipperholme cum Brighouse (Brighouse), SE 1425 2281 53°42′05″N 1°47′08″W			
	Notes: National Building Register:62921: (B)				
Millroyd Mills		Hipperholme cum Brighouse (Brighouse), SE 1475 2269 53°42′02″N 1°46′41″W			
	Notes: National Building Register:62857: (B)				
Mytholme Mills		Hipperholme cum Brighouse (Brighouse), SE 1155 2552 53°43′33″N 1°49′35″W			
	Notes: National Building Register:62823: (B)				
North Vale Mills		Hipperholme cum Brighouse (Brighouse), SE 1482 2500 53°43′16″N 1°46′37″W			
	Notes: National Building Register:62848: (B)				
Norwood Green Mill		Hipperholme cum Brighouse (Brighouse), SE 1429 2667 53°44′10″N 1°47′05″W			
	Notes: National Building Register:62844: (B)				
Owlerings Mill		Hipperholme cum Brighouse (Brighouse), SE 1430 2275 53°42′03″N 1°47′06″W			
	Notes: National Building Register:62852: (B)				
Perseverance Mill		Hipperholme cum Brighouse (Brighouse), SE 1467 2274 53°42′03″N 1°46′45″W; Grade II listed building, converted to engineering works.	1831		194
	Notes: National Building Register:62919: (B)				
Phoenix Mills		Hipperholme cum Brighouse (Brighouse), SE 1488 2287 53°42′07″N 1°46′34″W			
	Notes: National Building Register:62856: (B)				
Rookes Mill		Hipperholme cum Brighouse (Brighouse), SE 1450 2660 53°44′08″N 1°46′54″W			
	Notes: National Building Register:62845: (B)				
Slead Sike Mill		Hipperholme cum Brighouse (Brighouse), SE 1345 2355 53°42′29″N 1°47′52″W			
	Notes: National Building Register:62838: (B)				
Stott’s Mill		Hipperholme cum Brighouse (Brighouse), SE 1465 2260 53°41′59″N 1°46′46″W			
	Notes: National Building Register:62950: (C)				
Thornhill Bridge Dyeworks		Hipperholme cum Brighouse (Brighouse), SE 1465 2365 53°42′33″N 1°46′46″W			
	Notes: National Building Register:62849: (B)				
Thornhill Briggs Mill		Hipperholme cum Brighouse (Brighouse),			
	Notes: (see Thornhill Bridge Dyeworks)				
Upper Mill		Hipperholme cum Brighouse (Brighouse),			
	Notes: (see Bridge Road Works)				
Victoria Mill		Hipperholme cum Brighouse (Brighouse),			
	Notes: (see Bailiff Bridge Mill)				
Victoria Mills		Hipperholme cum Brighouse (Brighouse),			
	Notes: (see Albert Mills)				
Wilkin Royd Mills		Hipperholme cum Brighouse (Brighouse), SE 1490 2280 53°42′05″N 1°46′33″W			
	Notes: National Building Register:62860: (B)				
Woodvale Mills		Hipperholme cum Brighouse (Brighouse), SE 1475 2355 53°42′29″N 1°46′41″W			
	Notes: National Building Register:62850: (B)				

== Langfield (Todmorden) ==
Name	Architect	Location	Built	Demolished	Served (Years)
Albion Mills		Langfield (Todmorden), SD 9394 2415 53°42′49″N 2°05′36″W			
	Notes: National Building Register:62183: (B)				
Anchor Mill		Langfield (Todmorden), SD 9415 2440 53°42′57″N 2°05′24″W			
	Notes: National Building Register:62198: (B)				
Canal Street Works		Langfield (Todmorden), SD 9400 2415 53°42′49″N 2°05′33″W			
	Notes: National Building Register:62197: (B)				
Causeway Wood Mill		Langfield (Todmorden), SD 9520 2379 53°42′38″N 2°04′27″W			
	Notes: National Building Register:62254: (C)				
Der Street Mill		Langfield (Todmorden), SD 9420 2415 53°42′49″N 2°05′22″W			
	Notes: National Building Register:62199: (B)				
Derdale Mill		Langfield (Todmorden), SD 9430 2417 53°42′50″N 2°05′16″W			
	Notes: National Building Register:62200: (B)				
Jumb Mill		Langfield (Todmorden), SD 9555 2349 53°42′28″N 2°04′08″W			
	Notes: National Building Register:62206: (C)				
Laneside Mill		Langfield (Todmorden),			
	Notes: (see Waterside Mill)				
Lumbutts Mill		Langfield (Todmorden), SD 9565 2345 53°42′27″N 2°04′03″W			
	Notes: National Building Register:62207: (B)				
Nanholme Mill		Langfield (Todmorden), SD 9600 2475 53°43′09″N 2°03′44″W			
	Notes: National Building Register:62217: (B)				
Old Royd Mill		Langfield (Todmorden), SD 9512 2398 53°42′44″N 2°04′31″W			
	Notes: National Building Register:62255: (C)				
Sandholme Mill		Langfield (Todmorden), SD 9440 2420 53°42′51″N 2°05′11″W			
	Notes: National Building Register:62201: (B)				
Stoodley Bridge Mill		Langfield (Todmorden), SD 9630 2500 53°43′17″N 2°03′27″W			
	Notes: National Building Register:62215: (B)				
Waterside Mill		Langfield (Todmorden), SD 9345 2380 53°42′38″N 2°06′03″W			
	Notes: National Building Register:38205: (A)				
Woodhouse Mill		Langfield (Todmorden), SD 9515 2444 53°42′59″N 2°04′30″W	1832		193
	Notes: National Building Register:62205: Grade II* listed building (A)				

== Midgley (Hebden Royd; Sowerby Bridge; Wadsworth) ==
Name	Architect	Location	Built	Demolished	Served (Years)
Albert Mills(HR)		Midgley (Hebden Royd; Sowerby Bridge; Wadsworth), SE 0170 2585 53°43′45″N 1°58′33″W			
	Notes: National Building Register:62698: (B)				
Brearley Lower Mills (HR)		Midgley (Hebden Royd; Sowerby Bridge; Wadsworth), SE 0270 2594 53°43′47″N 1°57′38″W			
	Notes: National Building Register:62700: (B)				
Clough Mill(HR)		Midgley (Hebden Royd; Sowerby Bridge; Wadsworth), SE 0140 2605 53°43′51″N 1°58′49″W			
	Notes: National Building Register:62697: (B)				
Dean Mill (SB)		Midgley (Hebden Royd; Sowerby Bridge; Wadsworth), SE 0430 2731 53°44′32″N 1°56′11″W			
	Notes: National Building Register:62934: (C)				
Oats Royd Mills (SB)		Midgley (Hebden Royd; Sowerby Bridge; Wadsworth), SE 0395 2655 53°44′07″N 1°56′30″W	mid 19th century		
	Notes: National Building Register:62704: Grade II listed building (A)				
Stoney Springs Mills(HR)		Midgley (Hebden Royd; Sowerby Bridge; Wadsworth), SE 0283 2597 53°43′48″N 1°57′31″W			
	Notes: National Building Register:62701: (B)				
White Lee Mill (HR)		Midgley (Hebden Royd; Sowerby Bridge; Wadsworth), SE 0159 2615 53°43′54″N 1°58′39″W			
	Notes: National Building Register:62696: (B)				

== Norland (Sowerby Bridge) ==
Name	Architect	Location	Built	Demolished	Served (Years)
Belmont Mill		Norland (Sowerby Bridge), SE 0533 2283 53°42′07″N 1°55′15″W			
	Notes: National Building Register:62730: (B)				
Lock Hill Mills		Norland (Sowerby Bridge), SE 0625 2355 53°42′30″N 1°54′24″W			
	Notes: National Building Register:62740: (B)				
Meirclough Mills		Norland (Sowerby Bridge), SE 0695 2368 53°42′34″N 1°53′46″W			
	Notes: National Building Register:62915: (B)				
Old House Mill		Norland (Sowerby Bridge),			
	Notes: (see Belmont Mill)				
Valley Mills		Norland (Sowerby Bridge), SE 0610 2352 53°42′29″N 1°54′33″W			
	Notes: National Building Register:62739: (B)				
Watson Mills		Norland (Sowerby Bridge), SE 0550 2290 53°42′09″N 1°55′05″W			
	Notes: National Building Register:62729: (B)				

== Northowram ==
Name	Architect	Location	Built	Demolished	Served (Years)
Bankfield Mill(H)		Northowram , SE 0901 2598 53°43′48″N 1°51′54″W			
	Notes: National Building Register:62787: (B)				
BlackDyke Mills (QS)		Northowram , SE 104 302 53°46′05″N 1°50′37″W			
	Notes: National Building Register:397: (B)				
Bowling Dyke Dyeworks(H)		Northowram , SE 0925 2572 53°43′40″N 1°51′41″W			
	Notes: National Building Register:62790: (B)				
Bowling Dyke Mills (H)		Northowram , SE 0920 2578 53°43′42″N 1°51′43″W	1851		174
	Notes: National Building Register:62789: Grade II listed building(B)				
Crossleys Dyeworks(H)		Northowram , SE 084 265 53°44′05″N 1°52′27″W			
	Notes: National Building Register:946: (B)				
Dean Clough Mills(H)		Northowram , SE 089 258 53°43′43″N 1°52′00″W	1840s-1860s	in use	
	Notes: National Building Register:767: (B)				
Eastfield Mill(H)		Northowram , SE 1015 2590 53°43′46″N 1°50′51″W			
	Notes: National Building Register:62813: (B)				
Garden Street Mills (H)		Northowram , SE 0965 2570 53°43′39″N 1°51′19″W	1833		192
	Notes: National Building Register:62912: Grade II listed building. Now residential.(B)				
Haley Hill Mills(H)		Northowram , SE 0195 2585 53°43′45″N 1°58′19″W			
	Notes: National Building Register:62788: (B)				
Haley Hill Mill		Northowram ,			
	Notes: (see Bankfield Mill)				
Haley Hill Shed		Northowram ,			
	Notes: (see Bankfield Mill)				
Ladyship Mills (H)		Northowram , SE 0850 2679 53°44′15″N 1°52′21″W			
	Notes: National Building Register:62764: (B)				
Mill(H)		Northowram , SE 1005 2590 53°43′46″N 1°50′57″W			
	Notes: National Building Register:62812: (B)				
New Bank Mills		Northowram ,			
	Notes: (see Garden Street Mills)				
Old Lane Dyeworks(H)		Northowram , SE 0851 2642 53°44′03″N 1°52′21″W			
	Notes: National Building Register:62945: (C)				
Old Lane Mill (Rawson's Mill) (H)		Northowram , SE 0860 2635 53°44′00″N 1°52′16″W	1828		197
	Notes: National Building Register:62765: Grade II* listed building (A)				

== Ovenden (Halifax) ==
Name	Architect	Location	Built	Demolished	Served (Years)
Beechwood Mills		Ovenden (Halifax), SE 0819 2790 53°44′51″N 1°52′38″W			
	Notes: National Building Register:62763: (B)				
Beechwood Works		Ovenden (Halifax), SE 0765 2779 53°44′47″N 1°53′08″W			
	Notes: National Building Register:62743: (B)				
Box Trees Mill		Ovenden (Halifax), SE 0676 2705 53°44′23″N 1°53′56″W			
	Notes: National Building Register:62732: (B)				
Bradshaw Mill		Ovenden (Halifax), SE 0785 3010 53°46′02″N 1°52′57″W			
	Notes: National Building Register:41508: (C)				
Dapper Mill		Ovenden (Halifax), SE 0695 2672 53°44′12″N 1°53′46″W			
	Notes: National Building Register:62733: (B)				
Farcroft Mill		Ovenden (Halifax), SE 0816 3047 53°46′14″N 1°52′40″W			
	Notes: National Building Register:62378: (B)				
Forest Mill		Ovenden (Halifax), SE 0765 2750 53°44′38″N 1°53′08″W			
	Notes: National Building Register:62744: (B)				
Holmfield Mills		Ovenden (Halifax), SE 0845 2850 53°45′10″N 1°52′24″W			
	Notes: National Building Register:62762: (B)				
Illingworth Mills		Ovenden (Halifax), SE 071 282 53°45′00″N 1°53′38″W			
	Notes: National Building Register:936: (B)				
Jumples Mills		Ovenden (Halifax), SE 0646 2798 53°44′53″N 1°54′13″W			
	Notes: National Building Register:62731: (B)				
Lee Bank Mills		Ovenden (Halifax), SE 086 261 53°43′52″N 1°52′16″W			
	Notes: National Building Register:938 : (B)				
Little Hebble Mill		Ovenden (Halifax), SE 0761 2638 53°44′01″N 1°53′10″W			
	Notes: National Building Register:62746: (A)				
Lowerjack Royd Mill		Ovenden (Halifax), SE 0759 2649 53°44′05″N 1°53′11″W			
	Notes: National Building Register:62745: (B)				
Mixenden Works		Ovenden (Halifax), SE 0552 2829 53°45′03″N 1°55′04″W			
	Notes: National Building Register:62722: (B)				
Old Lane Mills		Ovenden (Halifax),			
	Notes: (see Lee Bank Mills)				
Providence Mills		Ovenden (Halifax),			
	Notes: (see Farcroft Mill)				
Wheatley Dyeworks		Ovenden (Halifax),			
	Notes: (see Dapper Mill)				
Wire Mill		Ovenden (Halifax),			
	Notes: (see Lowerjack Royd Mill)				
Clifby Works		Ovenden (Halifax), SE 0692 2589 53°43′46″N 1°53′48″W			
	Notes: National Building Register:62734: (B)				

== Rastrick (Brighouse) ==
Name	Architect	Location	Built	Demolished	Served (Years)
Calder Bank Mill		Rastrick (Brighouse), SE 1476 2255 53°41′57″N 1°46′41″W			
	Notes: National Building Register:62858: (B)				
Prince of Wales Mill		Rastrick (Brighouse), SE 1481 2250 53°41′55″N 1°46′38″W			
	Notes: National Building Register:62948: (C)				
Rosemary Dyeworks		Rastrick (Brighouse), SE 1415 2200 53°41′39″N 1°47′14″W			
	Notes: National Building Register:62862: (B)				
Slade Lane Mill		Rastrick (Brighouse), SE 1352 2071 53°40′58″N 1°47′48″W			
	Notes: National Building Register:62841: (B)				
Snake Hill Mill		Rastrick (Brighouse), SE 1481 2255 53°41′57″N 1°46′38″W			
	Notes: National Building Register:62859: (B)				
Spout Mill		Rastrick (Brighouse), SE 1335 2100 53°41′07″N 1°47′58″W			
	Notes: National Building Register:62840: (B)				

== Rishworth (Ripponden) ==
Name	Architect	Location	Built	Demolished	Served (Years)
Rishworth Mills		Rishworth (Ripponden), SE 0365 1795 53°39′29″N 1°56′47″W	mid 19th century	in use	
	Notes: National Building Register:62958: Grade II listed building (B)				
Slithero Mills		Rishworth (Ripponden), SE 0347 1876 53°39′55″N 1°56′56″W			
	Notes: National Building Register:62957: (B)				
Spring Mill		Rishworth (Ripponden), SE 0355 1689 53°38′55″N 1°56′52″W			
	Notes: National Building Register:62959: (B)				

== Skircoat (Halifax) ==
Name	Architect	Location	Built	Demolished	Served (Years)
Albert Mills		Skircoat (Halifax), SE 0635 2405 53°42′46″N 1°54′19″W			
	Notes: National Building Register:627f7: (B)				
Canal Mills		Skircoat (Halifax), SE 0735 2365 53°42′33″N 1°53′24″W			
	Notes: National Building Register:62757: (B)				
Clough Mill		Skircoat (Halifax), SE 0642 2385 53°42′40″N 1°54′15″W			
	Notes: National Building Register:62738: (B)				
Cop1ey Mill		Skircoat (Halifax), SE 0825 2250 53°41′56″N 1°52′35″W			
	Notes: National Building Register:62932: (C)				
Farrar Mills		Skircoat (Halifax), SE 0975 2355 53°42′30″N 1°51′14″W			
	Notes: National Building Register:62800: (B)				
Haugh Shaw Mills		Skircoat (Halifax), SE 0830 2421 53°42′51″N 1°52′33″W			
	Notes: National Building Register:62783: (B)				
Kings Mill		Skircoat (Halifax),			
	Notes: (see Albert Mills)				
Lower William Hall Mills		Skircoat (Halifax), SE 0641 2419 53°42′51″N 1°54′16″W			
	Notes: National Building Register:62736: (B)				
Moorlfield Mills		Skircoat (Halifax),			
	Notes: (see Haugh Shaw Mills)				
Salterhebble Mill		Skircoat (Halifax), SE 0972 2288 53°42′08″N 1°51′15″W			
	Notes: National Building Register:62802: (B)				
Sedburgh Mill		Skircoat (Halifax), SE 0970 2434 53°42′55″N 1°51′16″W			
	Notes: National Building Register:62797: (B)				
Shaw Lodge Mills		Skircoat (Halifax), SE 0968 2408 53°42′47″N 1°51′17″W	1847-1852		
	Notes: National Building Register:62798: Grade II* listed buildings (B)				
Stern Mills		Skircoat (Halifax), SE 0775 2325 53°42′20″N 1°53′03″W			
	Notes: National Building Register:62758: (B)				
Washer Lane Dyeworks		Skircoat (Halifax), SE 0770 2385 53°42′40″N 1°53′05″W			
	Notes: National Building Register:62756: (B)				

== Southowram ==
Name	Architect	Location	Built	Demolished	Served (Years)
Bailey Hall Mill(H)		Bailey Hall Rd, Southowram , SE 0990 2508 53°43′19″N 1°51′05″W			
	Notes: National Building Register:62914: Grade II listed building (B)				
Bottoms Mill (H)		Southowram , SE 0999 2321 53°42′19″N 1°51′01″W			
	Notes: National Building Register:62801: (B)				
Boys Mill (Phoebe Lane Mill)(H)		Southowram , SE 0969 2380 53°42′38″N 1°51′17″W			
	Notes: National Building Register:62799: (B)				
Brookfoot Mills (H)		Southowram , SE 1360 2285 53°42′07″N 1°47′44″W			
	Notes: National Building Register:62839: (B)				
Clark Bridge Mills (H)		Southowram , SE 0991 2525 53°43′25″N 1°51′05″W			
	Notes: National Building Register:62794: (B)				
Phoebe Lane Mills		Southowram ,			
	Notes: (see Boys Mill)				
Riding Hall		Southowram ,			
	Notes: (see Clark Bridge Mills)				
Stoney Road Mills (H)		Southowram , SE 0980 2455 53°43′02″N 1°51′11″W			
	Notes: National Building Register:62796: (B)				

== Sowerby (Hebden Royd; Sowerby Bridge) ==
Name	Architect	Location	Built	Demolished	Served (Years)
Asquith Bottom Dyeworks (SB)		Sowerby (Hebden Royd; Sowerby Bridge), SE 0575 2315 53°42′17″N 1°54′52″W			
	Notes: National Building Register:62728: (B)				
Asquith Bottom Mills (SB)		Sowerby (Hebden Royd; Sowerby Bridge), SE 0581 2317 53°42′18″N 1°54′48″W			
	Notes: National Building Register:62727: (B)				
Asquith Bottom Shed		Sowerby (Hebden Royd; Sowerby Bridge),			
	Notes: (see Asquith Bottom Dyeworks)				
Brockwell Mill (SB)		Sowerby (Hebden Royd; Sowerby Bridge), SE 0490 2290 53°42′09″N 1°55′38″W			
	Notes: National Building Register:62716: (B)				
Fairlea Mill (SB)		Sowerby (Hebden Royd; Sowerby Bridge), SE 0385 2460 53°43′04″N 1°56′35″W			
	Notes: National Building Register:62708: (B)				
Holme Royd Mill (SB)		Sowerby (Hebden Royd; Sowerby Bridge), SE 0380 2470 53°43′07″N 1°56′38″W			
	Notes: National Building Register:62707: (B)				
Mill House Mill (SB)		Sowerby (Hebden Royd; Sowerby Bridge), SE 0485 2255 53°41′58″N 1°55′41″W			
	Notes: National Building Register:62717: (A)				
Scar Bottom Mill (HR)		Sowerby (Hebden Royd; Sowerby Bridge), SE 0101 2575 53°43′41″N 1°59′10″W			
	Notes: National Building Register:62691: (B)				
Squareshed (HR)		Sowerby (Hebden Royd; Sowerby Bridge), SE 0129 2575 53°43′41″N 1°58′55″W			
	Notes: National Building Register:62699’: (B)				
Stansfield Mill (SB)		Sowerby (Hebden Royd; Sowerby Bridge), SE 0445 2210 53°41′43″N 1°56′03″W			
	Notes: National Building Register:62718: (B)				
Thorpe Mill (SB)		Sowerby (Hebden Royd; Sowerby Bridge), SE 0450 2150 53°41′24″N 1°56′00″W			
	Notes: National Building Register:62931: (B)				
WestEnd Mills(SB)		Sowerby (Hebden Royd; Sowerby Bridge), SE 0580 2334 53°42′23″N 1°54′49″W			
	Notes: National Building Register:62726: (B)				
West Mills(SB)		Sowerby (Hebden Royd; Sowerby Bridge), SE 0584 2339 53°42′25″N 1°54′47″W			
	Notes: National Building Register:62725: (B)				

== Soyland (Ripponden; Sowerby Bridge) ==
Name	Architect	Location	Built	Demolished	Served (Years)
Beeston Hall Mill(R)		Soyland (Ripponden; Sowerby Bridge), SE 0179 1911 53°40′06″N 1°58′28″W			
	Notes: National Building Register:62952: (B)				
Clough Mill (SB)		Soyland (Ripponden; Sowerby Bridge), SE 0252 2039 53°40′48″N 1°57′48″W			
	Notes: National Building Register:62702: (C)				
Commercial Mills(R)		Soyland (Ripponden; Sowerby Bridge), SE 0355 1906 53°40′05″N 1°56′52″W			
	Notes: National Building Register:62955: (B)				
Dean Mill (R)		Soyland (Ripponden; Sowerby Bridge), SE 0413 2132 53°41′18″N 1°56′20″W			
	Notes: National Building Register:62719: (B)				
Excelsior Mills (R)		Soyland (Ripponden; Sowerby Bridge), SE 0355 1900 53°40′03″N 1°56′52″W			
	Notes: National Building Register:63177: (B)				
Hollins Mill		Soyland (Ripponden; Sowerby Bridge),			
	Notes: (see Excelsior Mills)				
Kebroyd Mills(R)		Soyland (Ripponden; Sowerby Bridge), SE 0415 2130 53°41′17″N 1°56′19″W		2007	
	Notes: National Building Register:62720: (A)				
Lower Soyland Mill(R)		Soyland (Ripponden; Sowerby Bridge), SE 0351 2119 53°41′14″N 1°56′54″W			
	Notes: National Building Register:62930: (B)				
Mill (SB)		Soyland (Ripponden; Sowerby Bridge), SE 0346 2118 53°41′13″N 1°56′57″W			
	Notes: National Building Register:62710: (B)				
Ryburndale Paper Mill(R)		Soyland (Ripponden; Sowerby Bridge), SE 0260 1868 53°39′52″N 1°57′44″W			
	Notes: National Building Register:2953: (B)				
Small Lees Mills (R)		Soyland (Ripponden; Sowerby Bridge), SE 0378 1950 53°40′19″N 1°56′39″W			
	Notes: National Building Register:62954: (B)				
Stones Mill (R)		Soyland (Ripponden; Sowerby Bridge), SE 0328 1870 53°39′53″N 1°57′07″W			
	Notes: National Building Register:62956: (B)				
Thrum Hall Mill		Soyland (Ripponden; Sowerby Bridge),			
	Notes: (see Beeston Hall Mill)				
Upper Soyland Mill (R)		Soyland (Ripponden; Sowerby Bridge), SE 034 211 53°41′11″N 1°57′00″W			
	Notes: National Building Register:62935: (C)				
Upper Swift Place Mill		Soyland (Ripponden; Sowerby Bridge),			
	Notes: (see Ryburndale Paper Mill)				
Victoria Mills (R)		Soyland (Ripponden; Sowerby Bridge), SE 0430 2015 53°40′40″N 1°56′11″W			
	Notes: National Building Register:62721: (B)				

== Stansfield (Todmorden) ==
Name	Architect	Location	Built	Demolished	Served (Years)
Adamroyd Mill		Stansfield (Todmorden), SD 9354 2465 53°43′06″N 2°05′58″W			
	Notes: National Building Register:62177: (B)				
Bridge Royd Dyeworks		Stansfield (Todmorden), SD 9615 2490 53°43′14″N 2°03′35″W			
	Notes: National Building Register:62216: (A)				
Calais Mill, Blackshaw		Stansfield (Todmorden), SD 9740 2660 53°44′09″N 2°02′27″W			
	Notes: National Building Register:62221: (B)				
Calderside Dyeworks, Blackshaw		Stansfield (Todmorden), SD 9806 2706 53°44′24″N 2°01′51″W			
	Notes: National Building Register:62223: (C)				
Caldervale Mill		Stansfield (Todmorden), SD 9080 2635 53°44′00″N 2°08′27″W			
	Notes: National Building Register:62163: (B)				
Callis Mill		Stansfield (Todmorden),			
	Notes: (see Calais Mill)				
Canteen Shed		Stansfield (Todmorden), SD 9220 2555 53°43′35″N 2°07′11″W			
	Notes: National Building Register:62169: (B)				
Carr Mill		Stansfield (Todmorden), SD 9384 2450 53°43′01″N 2°05′41″W			
	Notes: National Building Register:62181: (B)				
Cinderhill Mills		Stansfield (Todmorden), SD 9520 2465 53°43′06″N 2°04′27″W			
	Notes: National Building Register:62203: (B)				
Cockden Mill		Stansfield (Todmorden), SD 9644 2554 53°43′34″N 2°03′20″W			
	Notes: National Building Register:62214: (C)				
Cornholme Mills		Stansfield (Todmorden), SD 9070 2635 53°44′00″N 2°08′33″W			
	Notes: National Building Register:62164: (C)				
Cowbridge Mill		Stansfield (Todmorden), SD 9659 2667 53°44′11″N 2°03′11″W			
	Notes: National Building Register:62209: (C)				
Crow Carr lngs Mill		Stansfield (Todmorden), SD 9380 2433 53°42′55″N 2°05′44″W			
	Notes: National Building Register:62179: (B)				
Eastwood Dyeworks		Stansfield (Todmorden),			
	Notes: (see Cockden Mill)				
Eastwood Shed		Stansfield (Todmorden), SD 9618 2585 53°43′44″N 2°03′34″W			
	Notes: National Building Register:62212: (A)				
Glen Dyeworks		Stansfield (Todmorden), SD 9081 2661 53°44′09″N 2°08′27″W			
	Notes: National Building Register:62162: (B)				
Hare Mill		Stansfield (Todmorden),			
	Notes: (See Mons Mill)				
Harley House Mill		Stansfield (Todmorden), SD 9360 2470 53°43′07″N 2°05′54″W			
	Notes: National Building Register:62178: (B)				
Hope Mill Size Works		Stansfield (Todmorden), SD 9378 2444 53°42′59″N 2°05′45″W			
	Notes: National Building Register:62180: (B)				
Jumble Hole Mill, Blackshaw		Stansfield (Todmorden), SD 9685 2640 53°44′02″N 2°02′57″W			
	Notes: National Building Register:62211: (B)				
Land Mill, Blackshaw		Stansfield (Todmorden), SD 9549 2895 53°45′25″N 2°04′12″W			
	Notes: National Building Register:62202: (C)				
Lydgate Mill		Stansfield (Todmorden), SD 9211 2566 53°43′38″N 2°07′16″W			
	Notes: National Building Register:62263: (B)				
Millsteads Mill		Stansfield (Todmorden), SD 9519 2465 53°43′06″N 2°04′28″W			
	Notes: National Building Register:62204: (B)				
Mons Mill		Stansfield (Todmorden), SD 9310 2495 53°43′15″N 2°06′22″W	1907	2000	93
	Notes: National Building Register:62239: (A)				
Mytholm Mill, Blackshaw		Stansfield (Todmorden), SD 9830 2730 53°44′31″N 2°01′38″W			
	Notes: National Building Register:62240: (B)				
Phoenix Punch and Shear Works		Stansfield (Todmorden), SD 9467 2449 53°43′00″N 2°04′56″W			
	Notes: National Building Register:62196: (B)				
Portsmouth Mill		Stansfield (Todmorden), SD 8995 2635 53°44′00″N 2°09′14″W			
	Notes: National Building Register:62161: (B)				
Ridgefoot Mill		Stansfield (Todmorden), SD 9368 2430 53°42′54″N 2°05′50″W			
	Notes: National Building Register:62270: (C)				
Spa Hole Mill, Blackshaw		Stansfield (Todmorden), SD 9669 2641 53°44′03″N 2°03′06″W			
	Notes: National Building Register:62210: (C)				
Spaw Mill		Stansfield (Todmorden),			
	Notes: (see Spa Hole Mill)				
Spring Wood Mill		Stansfield (Todmorden), SD 9085 2631 53°43′59″N 2°08′25″W			
	Notes: National Building Register:62165: (B)				
Stamps Mill, Blackshaw		Stansfield (Todmorden), SD 962 269 53°44′18″N 2°03′33″W			
	Notes: National Building Register:62256: (C)				
Underbank Dyeworks		Stansfield (Todmorden),			
	Notes: (see Jumble Hole Mill)				
Underbank Mill		Stansfield (Todmorden),			
	Notes: (see Jumble Hole Mill)				
Vale Mill		Stansfield (Todmorden), SD 9388 2446 53°42′59″N 2°05′39″W			
	Notes: National Building Register:62182: (C)				

== Todmorden And Walsden ==
Name	Architect	Location	Built	Demolished	Served (Years)
Alma Mills		Todmorden And Walsden, SD 9330 2220 53°41′46″N 2°06′11″W			
	Notes: National Building Register:62190: (B)				
Asia Mill		Todmorden And Walsden, SD 905 278 53°44′47″N 2°08′44″W			
	Notes: National Building Register:250: (B)				
Birks Mill		Todmorden And Walsden, SD 9358 2190 53°41′37″N 2°05′55″W			
	Notes: National Building Register:62193: (B)				
Bottoms Mill		Todmorden And Walsden, SD 9335 2145 53°41′22″N 2°06′08″W			
	Notes: National Building Register:62194: (B)				
Carrfield Mill		Todmorden And Walsden, SD 9020 2615 53°43′54″N 2°09′00″W			
	Notes: National Building Register:62167: (B)				
Clough Mill		Todmorden And Walsden, SD 9302 2260 53°41′59″N 2°06′26″W			
	Notes: National Building Register:62261: (B)				
Copperas House Mill		Todmorden And Walsden, SD 9305 2281 53°42′06″N 2°06′24″W			
	Notes: National Building Register:62262: (B)				
Dancroft Mill		Todmorden And Walsden, SD 9299 2315 53°42′17″N 2°06′28″W			
	Notes: National Building Register:62174: (B)				
Friths Mill		Todmorden And Walsden, SD 9265 2314 53°42′17″N 2°06′46″W			
	Notes: National Building Register:62172: (B)				
Frostholme Mill		Todmorden And Walsden, SD 9075 2625 53°43′57″N 2°08′30″W			
	Notes: National Building Register:62166: (A)				
Gauxholme Mill		Todmorden And Walsden, SD 929 232 53°42′19″N 2°06′33″W			
	Notes: National Building Register:173: (B)				
Gorpley Mill		Todmorden And Walsden, SD 918 235 53°42′28″N 2°07′33″W			
	Notes: National Building Register:249: (B)				
Hollins Mill		Todmorden And Walsden, SD 9340 2205 53°41′41″N 2°06′05″W; Grade II listed building	1858		167
	Notes: National Building Register:6219l: (A)				
Hope Mill		Todmorden And Walsden, SD 9328 2230 53°41′49″N 2°06′12″W			
	Notes: National Building Register:62189: (A)				
Inchfield Picker Works		Todmorden And Walsden, SD 9332 2192 53°41′37″N 2°06′10″W			
	Notes: National Building Register:62192: (B)				
Italy Mill		Todmorden And Walsden, SD 902 237 53°42′35″N 2°09′00″W			
	Notes: National Building Register:248: (B)				
Jubilee Mill		Todmorden And Walsden, SD 9330 2145 53°41′22″N 2°06′11″W			
	Notes: National Building Register:62195: (B)				
Lacy Mill		Todmorden And Walsden, SD 932 223 53°41′49″N 2°06′16″W			
	Notes: National Building Register:188: (B)				
Lineholme Mill		Todmorden And Walsden, SD 9236 2549 53°43′33″N 2°07′02″W			
	Notes: National Building Register:62170: (B)				
Mill,Jumps		Todmorden And Walsden, SD 921 261 53°43′52″N 2°07′16″W			
	Notes: National Building Register:269: (B)				
Owler Carr Mill		Todmorden And Walsden, SD 9111 2380 53°42′38″N 2°08′10″W			
	Notes: National Building Register:62251: (B)				
Portsmouth Mill		Todmorden And Walsden, SD 8980 2630 53°43′59″N 2°09′22″W			
	Notes: National Building Register:62241: (B)				
Ramsden Mill		Todmorden And Walsden, SD 9291 2122 53°41′15″N 2°06′32″W			
	Notes: National Building Register:62176: (B)				
Robinwood Mill		Todmorden And Walsden, SD 9200 2565 53°43′38″N 2°07′22″W			
	Notes: National Building Register:62168: (A)				
Salford Mill		Todmorden And Walsden, SD 9340 2395 53°42′43″N 2°06′05″W			
	Notes: National Building Register:62184: (B)				
Smithy Holme Mill		Todmorden And Walsden, SD 9307 2275 53°42′04″N 2°06′23″W			
	Notes: National Building Register:62186: (B)				
Spring Dyeworks		Todmorden And Walsden, SD 9281 2130 53°41′17″N 2°06′37″W			
	Notes: National Building Register:62175: (B)				
Spring Mill		Todmorden And Walsden,			
	Notes: (see Ramsden Mill)				
Stones Wood Mill		Todmorden And Walsden, SD 9221 2331 53°42′22″N 2°07′10″W			
	Notes: National Building Register:62252: (B)				
Stoneswood Mill		Todmorden And Walsden, SD 9224 2331 53°42′22″N 2°07′09″W			
	Notes: National Building Register:62171: (B)				
Wadsworth Mill		Todmorden And Walsden, SD 932 234 53°42′25″N 2°06′16″W			
	Notes: National Building Register:185: (B)				
Waterstalls Mill		Todmorden And Walsden, SD 943 212 53°41′14″N 2°05′16″W			
	Notes: National Building Register:253: (B)				
Wood Bottom Mill		Todmorden And Walsden, SD 9320 2261 53°41′59″N 2°06′16″W			
	Notes: National Building Register:62187: (B)				

== Wadsworth (Hebden Royd; Wadsworth) ==
Name	Architect	Location	Built	Demolished	Served (Years)
Acre Mill (W)		Wadsworth (Hebden Royd; Wadsworth), SE 0045 2825 53°45′02″N 1°59′41″W			
	Notes: National Building Register:62687: (B)				
Alexandra Shed (W)		Wadsworth (Hebden Royd; Wadsworth), SE 0075 2639 53°44′02″N 1°59′24″W			
	Notes: National Building Register:62690: (B)				
Bridge Mill (HR)		Wadsworth (Hebden Royd; Wadsworth), SD 9932 2736 53°44′33″N 2°00′42″W	c. 1830		
	Notes: National Building Register:62245: Grade II listed building (B)				
Canal Wharf Saw Mills (HR)		Wadsworth (Hebden Royd; Wadsworth), SE 0032 2649 53°44′05″N 1°59′48″W			
	Notes: National Building Register:62927: (B)				
Crimsworth Dyeworks (W)		Wadsworth (Hebden Royd; Wadsworth), SD 9920 2899 53°45′26″N 2°00′49″W			
	Notes: National Building Register:62229: (B)				
Croft Mill (HR)		Wadsworth (Hebden Royd; Wadsworth), SD 9939 2716 53°44′27″N 2°00′39″W			
	Notes: National Building Register:62243: (B)				
Crossley Mill (HR)		Wadsworth (Hebden Royd; Wadsworth), SD 9940 2710 53°44′25″N 2°00′38″W			
	Notes: National Building Register:62238: (B)				
Foster Mill (HR)		Wadsworth (Hebden Royd; Wadsworth), SD 9925 2779 53°44′47″N 2°00′46″W			
	Notes: National Building Register:62232: (C)				
Hawks Clough Shed		Wadsworth (Hebden Royd; Wadsworth),			
	Notes: (see Alexandra Shed)				
Hawksclough Mill (HR)		Wadsworth (Hebden Royd; Wadsworth), SE 0090 2624 53°43′57″N 1°59′16″W			
	Notes: National Building Register:62933: (B)				
Martin Mill (W)		Wadsworth (Hebden Royd; Wadsworth), SE 0025 2798 53°44′53″N 1°59′52″W			
	Notes: National Building Register:: (C)				
Mayroyd Mill(HR)		Wadsworth (Hebden Royd; Wadsworth), SD 9958 2690 53°44′18″N 2°00′28″W			
	Notes: National Building Register:62266: (B)				
Mill (HR)		Wadsworth (Hebden Royd; Wadsworth), SD 9939 2719 53°44′28″N 2°00′39″W			
	Notes: National Building Register:62244: (B)				
Nutclough Mill (HR)		Wadsworth (Hebden Royd; Wadsworth), SD 9945 2755 53°44′40″N 2°00′35″W	early/mid 19th century		
	Notes: National Building Register:8277: Grade II listed building (B)				
Old Town Mill (W)		Wadsworth (Hebden Royd; Wadsworth), SD 9985 2840 53°45′07″N 2°00′14″W	1851		174
	Notes: National Building Register:62231: Grade II listed building(B)				
Pecket Well Mill (W)		Wadsworth (Hebden Royd; Wadsworth), SD 9975 2969 53°45′49″N 2°00′19″W	c.1840-1858		
	Notes: National Building Register:62228: Grade II listed building (A)				
Upper Midge Hole Mill		Wadsworth (Hebden Royd; Wadsworth),			
	Notes: (see Crimsworth Dyeworks)				
Victoria Shed(HR)		Wadsworth (Hebden Royd; Wadsworth), SD 9925 2770 53°44′44″N 2°00′46″W			
	Notes: National Building Register:62233: (B)				
Westfield Mill (W)		Wadsworth (Hebden Royd; Wadsworth), SE 0119 2615 53°43′54″N 1°59′00″W			
	Notes: National Building Register:62694: (B)				
Windsor Shed/Works		Wadsworth (Hebden Royd; Wadsworth),			
	Notes: (see Victoria Shed)				

== Warley ==
Name	Architect	Location	Built	Demolished	Served (Years)
Carlton Mills		Warley ,			
	Notes: (see Sowerby Bridge Mills)				
Cooperhouse Mills (SB)		Warley , SE 0391 2440 53°42′58″N 1°56′32″W			
	Notes: National Building Register:62709: (C)				
Corporation Mill (SB)		Warley , SE 0590 2361 53°42′32″N 1°54′44″W			
	Notes: National Building Register:62724: (B)				
Denholme Mill (SB)		Warley , SE 0391 2471 53°43′08″N 1°56′32″W			
	Notes: National Building Register:62706: (B)				
Hole Bottom Mill(H)		Warley , SE 0482 2921 53°45′33″N 1°55′42″W			
	Notes: National Building Register:62711: (B)				
Holme House Mill(H)		Warley , SE 0398 2801 53°44′54″N 1°56′28″W			
	Notes: National Building Register:62703: (B)				
Holme Mill (SB)		Warley , SE 055 237 53°42′35″N 1°55′05″W			
	Notes: National Building Register:62723: (c)				
Hoyle Bottom Mill		Warley ,			
	Notes: (see Hole Bottom Mill)				
Jowler Mill		Warley ,			
	Notes: (see Holme House Mill)				
Lock Hill Mills (SB)		Warley , SE 0625 2365 53°42′33″N 1°54′24″W			
	Notes: National Building Register:62740: (B)				
Longbottom Mill (SB)		Warley , SE 0419 2405 53°42′46″N 1°56′17″W			
	Notes: National Building Register:62715: (B)				
Luddenden Clothing Factory (H)		Warley , SE 0415 2590 53°43′46″N 1°56′19″W			
	Notes: National Building Register:62929: (B)				
Luddenden Foot Mill (SB)		Warley , SE 0380 2510 53°43′20″N 1°56′38″W			
	Notes: National Building Register:62705": (B)				
Luddenden Mills		Warley ,			
	Notes: (see Luddenden Clothing Factory)				
Lumb Mill (H)		Warley , SE 0470 2888 53°45′22″N 1°55′49″W	1803		222
	Notes: National Building Register:62712: Grade II* listed building Cotton spinning watermill converted to worsted spinning in 1833 (A)				
Peel House Mill (H)		Warley , SE 0425 2674 53°44′13″N 1°56′13″W			
	Notes: National Building Register:62714 : (C)				
Sowerby Bridge Mills (Carlton Mill)(SB)		Warley , SE 0609 2360 53°42′32″N 1°54′33″W	1850		175
	Notes: National Building Register:8280: Grade II listed building (A)				
Square Mill		Warley ,			
	Notes: (see Hole Bottom Mill)				
Wainstalls Mill (H)		Warley, Wainstalls SE 0440 2865 53°45′15″N 1°56′05″W			
	Notes: National Building Register:62713: (B)				
Wainstalls New Mill (H)		Warley, Wainstalls SE 0467 2855 53°45′12″N 1°55′50″W		in use	
	Notes: National Building Register:62928: Now an apartment block (B)				
Warley Springs Dyeworks (H)		Warley , SE 0626 2478 53°43′10″N 1°54′24″W			
	Notes: National Building Register:62735: (B)				
Wharf Mill (SB)		Warley , SE 0640 2368 53°42′34″N 1°54′16″W			
	Notes: National Building Register:62741: (C)				

== Wyke (Brighouse; Wyke) ==
Name	Architect	Location	Built	Demolished	Served (Years)
Bailliff Bridge Mill (B)		Wyke (Brighouse; Wyke), SE 149 251 53°43′19″N 1°46′32″W			
	Notes: National Building Register:847: (B)				
City Shed (W)		Wyke (Brighouse; Wyke), SE 1550 2735 53°44′32″N 1°45′59″W			
	Notes: National Building Register:62866: (A)				
Clifton Mills		Wyke (Brighouse; Wyke),			
	Notes: (see BailliffBridge Mill)				
Crown Point Mills		Wyke (Brighouse; Wyke),			
	Notes: (see City Shed)				
New Mill (W)		Wyke (Brighouse; Wyke), SE 1545 2698 53°44′20″N 1°46′02″W			
	Notes: National Building Register:62868: (B)				
Station Mills (W)		Wyke (Brighouse; Wyke), SE 1490 2685 53°44′16″N 1°46′32″W			
	Notes: National Building Register:62842: (B)				
Wyke Mills (W)		Wyke (Brighouse; Wyke), SE 1503 2690 53°44′18″N 1°46′25″W			
	Notes: National Building Register:62867: (B)				

== See also ==
- Heavy Woollen District
- Textile processing
