= Lumbutts =

Village in West Yorkshire, England

Coordinates: 53.706°N 2.072°W

- Village
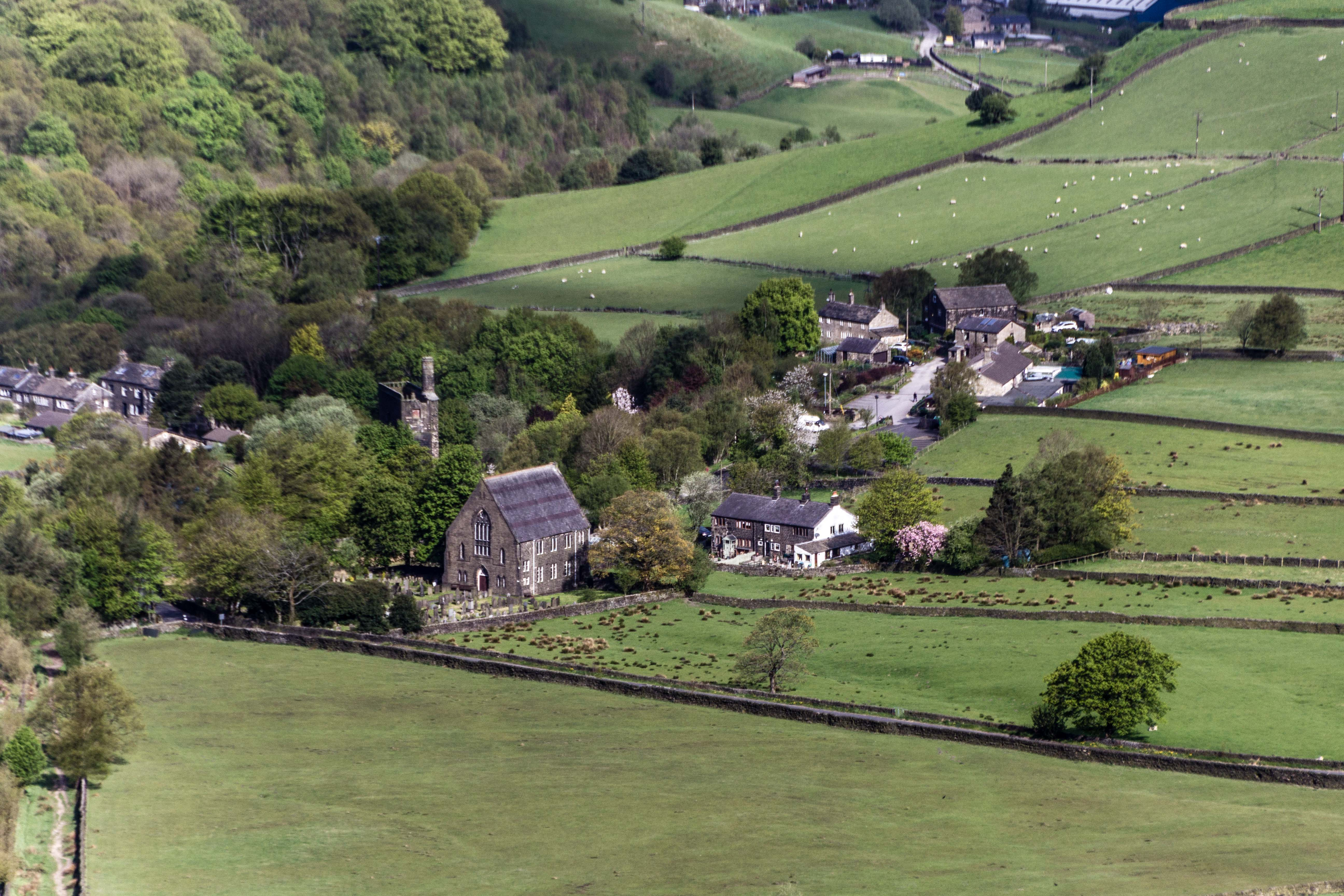
- The water tower can be seen beyond the Methodist church

- Location within West Yorkshire
- OS grid reference: SD952233
- Civil parish: Todmorden
- Metropolitan borough: Calderdale
- Metropolitan county: West Yorkshire
- Region: Yorkshire and the Humber
- Country: England
- Sovereign state: United Kingdom
- Post town: TODMORDEN
- Postcode district: OL14
- Police: West Yorkshire
- Fire: West Yorkshire
- Ambulance: Yorkshire

Lumbutts is a former mill village just to the south of Todmorden, in West Yorkshire, England. Lumbutts and the adjacent village of Mankinholes, were traditionally hand-loom weaving villages located on an old packhorse route that traversed the southern side of the Calder Valley. The village is east of Rochdale and west of Halifax.

== History ==
The first documented history of the name of the village dates back to 1538. It is recorded as being from the Old Norse of Lumm and Butte, meaning a pool by an abutment of land. The second part may also come to mean a log, or stump. The village was traditionally associated with hand-weaving on looms, and was located on a packhorse route connecting Cheshire with Halifax and Calderdale. The village is 2 miles (3.2 km) south of Todmorden, 9 miles (14 km) north-east of Rochdale, and 12 miles (19 km) west of Halifax.

A corn mill was recorded at the village in 1557, but it converted to processing cotton in the 1780s. During the 1830s, the village flourished as a mill village with water providing the power for the mills. This involved building several dams (Mill Dam, Lees Dam, Jumb Mill Dam, Causeway Dam, Fieldens Dam and Heeley Dam) in the village, and another on the moor to the south known as (the westerly) Gaddings Dam. Water through the village entered via Black Clough, and left northwards (downhill) via Lumbutts Clough. Water from Lumbutts Clough was used to supplement the water needs in the Rochdale Canal on the valley floor, for which another dam (the easterly Gaddings Dam) was built. Lumbutts Old Mill closed in 1926, and was later used as a government storage location during the Second World War. After the war, the main mill building was demolished.

Lumbutts Old Mill had and adjacent water tower which still stands and reaches a height of 98 feet (30 m). It was built in three stages, with each stage having a vertical water wheel that was 30 feet (9.1 m) in diameter and 6 feet (1.8 m) wide. Water was fed not only to each wheel individually, but also fell from the top down to the middle, and then onto bottom wheel generating around 54 horsepower. It is not known how the water was taken up to the uppermost stage, but it is believed a system of pumps and syphons were used. The tower is now a grade II listed monument, and it was restored in 2017 with money raised through crowdfunding. There are several other listed buildings within the village including the Methodist church, which was established in 1837 after a schism with the Methodists in Makinholes, and a milestone.

The old packhorse route through the village had been in existence for at least 500 years by the time of the 21st century. These routes were the only roads in the area as the valley bottom was afforested until the arrival of turnpike roads in the 1700s. The road up into Lumbutts was improved in the 1820s due to the increase in finished mill products from the village. Lumbutts has a two-hourly bus service into Todmorden. The long-distance footpaths, the Calderdale Way and The Pennine Bridleway, both pass through the village. Both Lumbutts and Makinholes were designated a conservation area in 1980. There is one pub in the village, the Top Brink Inn, which used to be known as the Dog and Partridge until 1970.

== Governance ==
Lumbutts lies within the civil parish of Todmorden, part of the metropolitan area of Calderdale in West Yorkshire. The area is represented at Westminster as part of the Calder Valley Constituency.

== Notable people ==
- David Chaytor, Member of Parliament for Bury North, lived in Lumbutts during the early 2010s

== Film and television ==
Lumbutts (specifically the "Lower Lumbutts Bicycle Juggling Fair") is mentioned in the animated comedy television show The Treacle People, which is set in the nearby village of Sabden.
