= Rochdale Branch Canal =

Canal in north-west England

Coordinates: 53°36′29″N 2°08′54″W

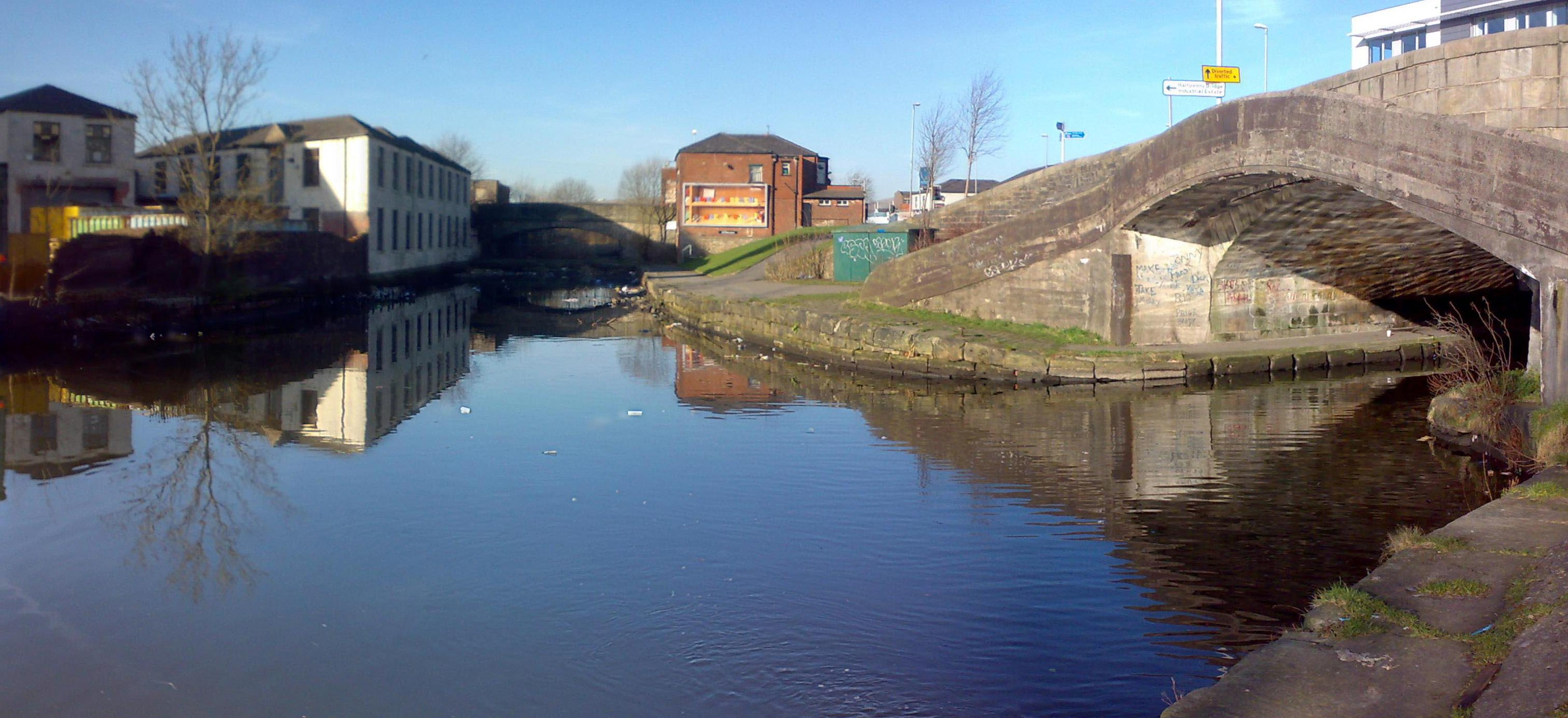
- The branch canal heading into Rochdale (in the centre). The route to Hebden bridge is on the right; that to Manchester is behind the photographer.

Specifications
- Status: Filled in and built over

History
- Original owner: Rochdale Canal Company
- Date of act: 1794
- Date of first use: 1798
- Date closed: 1920s

Geography
- Start point: Rochdale
- Connects to: Rochdale Canal

The Rochdale Branch Canal was a branch of the Rochdale Canal in north-west England which led close to Rochdale Town Centre. It was in use from 1794, and was bordered by the landscaped gardens of Lark Mill House on the western bank until the 1850s. A number of industries grew up around the branch, ranging from cotton mills and an iron and brass foundry in the early years, to a bakery and jam manufactory, woollen mills and sawmills later on. The branch declined with the main canal, and was little used after the 1920s, although not officially abandoned until 1952. It was filled in during the 1960s, and the site of the main basins now lies beneath the car park of a retail shopping centre.

== History ==
The Rochdale Canal was surveyed by John Rennie in June 1791, although he had no experience of building canals at the time. He was chosen because the engineers of choice, William Jessop and Robert Whitworth, did not have time for the project. In August 1791 Rennie was asked to conduct further surveys for a branch to Rochdale, another to Oldham and a third to some limeworks near Todmorden. The canal was authorised by Rochdale Canal Act 1794 (34 Geo. 3. c. 78) on 4 April 1794, which created the Rochdale Canal Company and sanctioned the building of a canal across the Pennines from Sowerby Bridge, where it would join the Calder and Hebble Navigation, to Manchester, where it would connect to the Bridgewater Canal.

Construction of the whole canal would take around 13 years, but sections were opened as and when they became useful, and the Rochdale Branch, which was about half a mile (0.8 km) long, was opened in 1798, from a basin at Richard Street to Halfpenny Bridge. Additional sections were opened in 1799, and the canal was formally opened in 1804, but there seems to be some doubt that it was all constructed, for two more acts of Parliament were obtained in 1804 and 1806 to raise additional finance, and a final one in 1807 to tidy up some loose ends.

Navigation on the main canal had all but ceased by 1927, and the Rochdale Canal Act 1952 (15 & 16 Geo. 6 & 1 Eliz. 2. c. xxxvii) banned public navigation on most of the waterway. It lay dormant for 20 years, but between then and 2002 the waterway was steadily restored and reopened. In 2000, ownership of the canal transferred from the Rochdale Canal Company to British Waterways, but there were no plans to re-open the Rochdale Branch.

The branch was filled in at the end of the 1960s, and a retail shopping centre has been built over the end of the canal, with the former basin serving as the car park. Just a short section from the junction to Durham Street remains in water, and is used as a turning point. However, the line of the canal can still be traced as far as the railway bridge, while Durham Street bridge and Halfpenny Bridge remain. Dating from 1831, Halfpenny Bridge is a grade II listed structure, and is a rare example of a toll bridge crossing a canal. It is constructed of wrought iron and cast iron, with York stone paving. The footbridge was restored in 1978, and the bridge carries a plaque to commemorate this.

== Industry ==
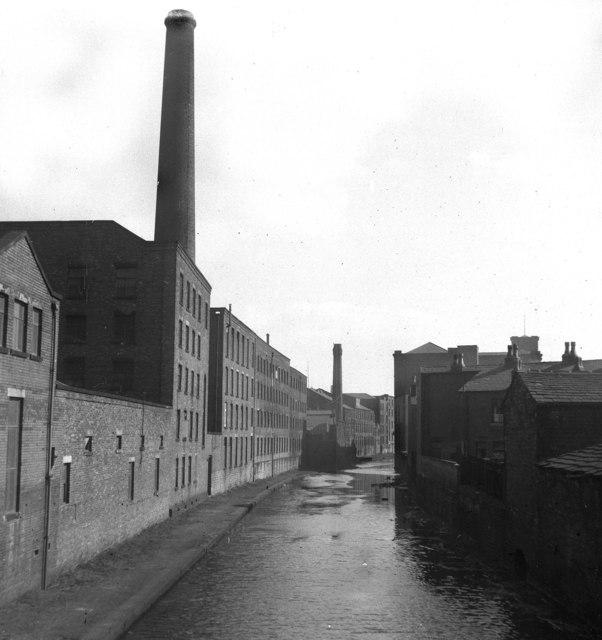
The canal viewed from Halfpenny Bridge in 1955

The branch acted as a centre for industry. In 1851, Durham Street Bridge had yet to be built, but Crossfield Bridge crossed the canal just below the Bedford Street Mills arm. Nothing had been built to the west of the canal or on either side of Bedford Street Mills arm, but to the east of the canal, there were houses at the bottom, and above that, Oldham Road Mill, which was a cotton spinning mill and Soho Foundry, which was an iron and brass foundry. By 1892, Collinge Street had been built, and Durham Street Bridge carried it over the canal. Cotton mills had been built on the west side of the junction with the Rochdale Canal, and Crossfield Bridge had been removed, as the rest of the west bank up to the arm was now occupied by Grove Cotton Mills. Oldham Road Mill had been replaced by a larger building housing Victoria Woolen Mill, and the iron and brass foundry had been split to become Soho Woollen Mill and Soho Iron Foundry. In 1910, the mills at the start of the branch can be identified as the Norwich Street Mills, and both of the Soho works have become the Soho Iron Works, which was still the case in 1930. By 1958, most of the buildings are just labelled "works", and so usage is not so obvious.

On the west bank, most of the area between the Bedford Street Mills arm and the Halfpenny Bridge was occupied by Lark Mill House in 1851, with landscaped gardens running down to the edge of the canal, which was lined with trees. By 1892, Larkfield Cotton Mills had been built on the south side of the arm, and Lark Cotton Mills on the north-west corner. In 1910, the map shows that Bedford Street had been built, Lark Mills had become the Bridgewater Mill, and Lark Mill House had been replaced by rows of terraced housing. The north side of the arm was occupied by Windsor Mill in 1930, which was used for mill furnishing, and the end of the arm is covered, but it is not clear if this is an awning or a building. By 1958, Lark Mill had become the British Tours garage.

On the east bank above the arm, the towpath in 1851 was flanked by Moss Hall Mill, a cotton spinning mill with a boilerhouse to the north, and Gibralter Cotton Mill. Both had become Moss Hall Cotton Mill by 1892, a bakery and jam manufactory by 1910, and warehousing by 1930. Beyond was Halfpenny Bridge, although not named as such in 1851, and the twin-tracked railway bridge. Sandwiched between them was Lark Corn Mill on the west bank and Oldham Road Cotton Mill to the east. By 1892, the cotton mill was disused, and the site of the corn mill had been cleared. Halfpenny Bridge is clearly labelled as such. It was a footbridge, and the steps leading up to it on the west bank, and another set leading down from the road to the towpath on the east bank can be clearly identified. The Grecian Emery Works had appeared on the east bank by 1910, and was still operating in 1930.

=== Basins ===
To the north of the railway were a short arm and two basins. The arm was a similar width to the canal, and was bordered by wharves, equipped with cranes. Next was a longer and somewhat wider basin, with bays on both sides near the end, where there was a warehouse on the east bank. Again there are cranes marked on the map, and Vicars Moss cotton spinning mills and Union Sawmills were located between the two basins in 1851. The final basin was much wider, and was flanked by warehouses to the east and across the north end. The western side was bordered by wharves, with canal warehouses beyond them, and a total of twelve cranes. Radcliffe Cotton Mill was located between the wharves and the railway bridge. By 1892, Radcliffe Mill had gone, to be replaced by a dry dock equipped with a travelling crane, and more wharves, with two travelling cranes. High Level Road had been built, and Union Sawmills had been replaced by a sawmill between the first arm and the bridge. Vicars Moss Mills were now a woollen mill. The sawmills had been replaced by wharves in 1910, and a timber yard occupied the east side of the middle basin. By 1930, Vicars Moss Mill was processing cotton waste, while most of the first arm had been filled in. Between its location and the bridge, a picture house and a billiard hall had been built. The dry dock was no more, and a masonic hall had been built on the wharf. The first arm was the site of a garage in 1958, and the picture house and billiard hall had been replaced by a works, but again its usage is unspecified.

== See also ==
- Canals of the United Kingdom
- History of the British canal system

== Bibliography ==
- Hadfield, Charles; Biddle, Gordon (1970). The Canals of North West England (Vol 2). David and Charles. ISBN 978-0-7153-4992-2.
- Priestley, Joseph (1831). Historical Account of the Navigable Rivers, Canals, and Railways of Great Britain. Archived from the original on 3 March 2016.
