= Tuel Lane Lock =

Canal lock on the Rochdale Canal in Sowerby Bridge, England

Coordinates: 53.709710°N 1.908783°W

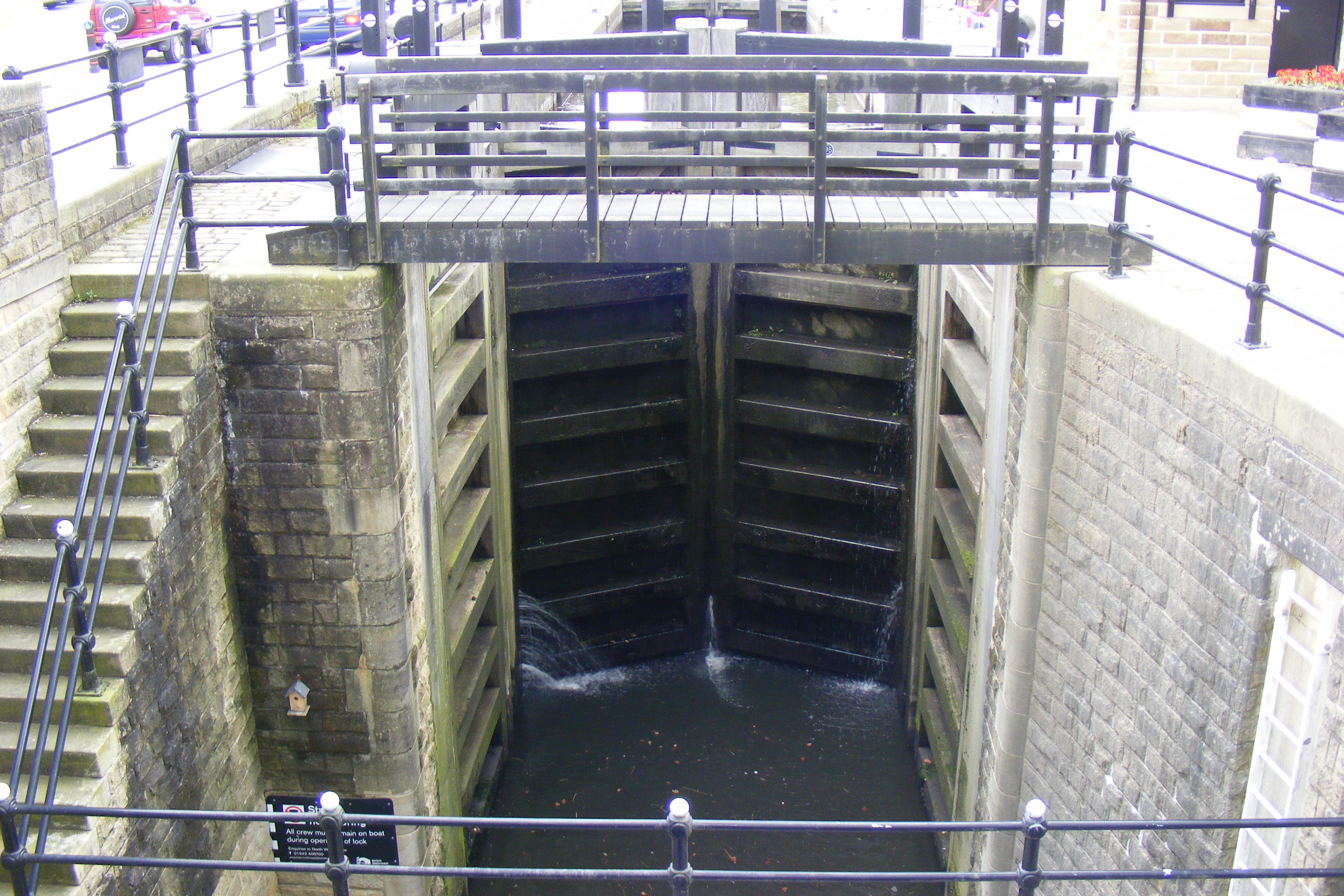
- The bottom set of lock gates
- Waterway: Rochdale Canal
- County: West Yorkshire
- Maintained by: Canal & River Trust
- First built: 1996
- Length: 72 feet (22 m)
- Width: 14 feet (4.3 m)
- Fall: 19 feet 8 inches (6 m)

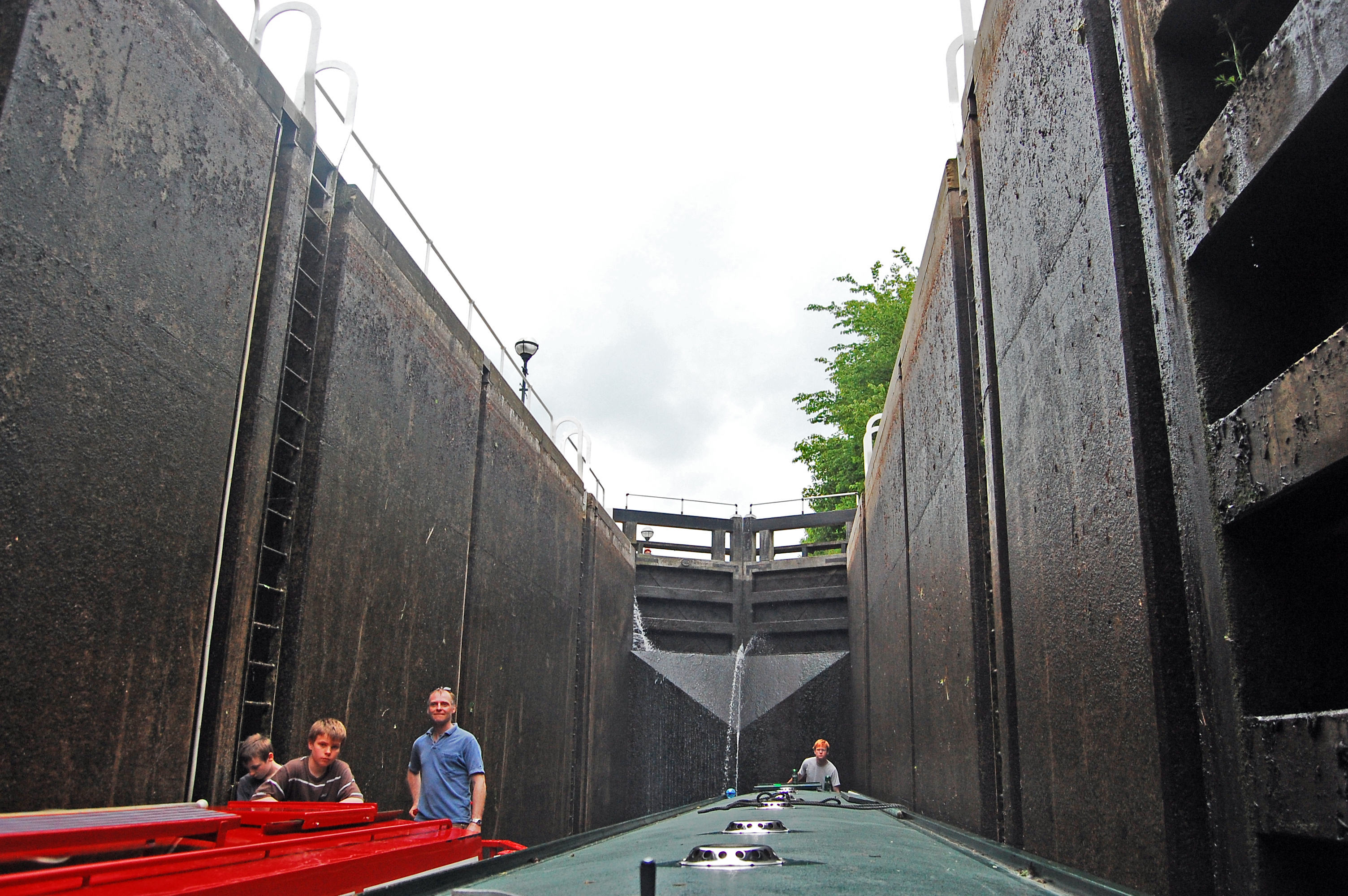
Narrowboats inside the lock

Tuel Lane Lock is a canal lock, situated on the Rochdale Canal in Sowerby Bridge, England. It was built in 1996 as part of the canal's restoration, and replaces two previous locks, locks 3 and 4, from the original canal system. With a fall of 19 feet 8.5 inches (6 m), it is the deepest lock in the United Kingdom.

== History ==
The Rochdale Canal opened in 1804, the first of three trans-Pennine canals to be completed, and it proved to be very successful, until the First World War, when a steady decline in traffic began. All traffic had ceased by 1937, and most of the canal was closed to navigation and officially abandoned by an Act of Parliament in 1952. Parts of its line in Sowerby Bridge were filled in for a road widening scheme.

In 1965, when the company sought to abandon the final section of the canal, the Inland Waterways Association petitioned against it, and interest in restoring the canal developed, leading to the formation of the Rochdale Canal Society in 1974. The society was committed to seeing the canal re-opened. Despite the Manpower Services Commission funding restoration work under the Job Creation Scheme from 1975, there were plans to sever the route with a low-level crossing by the proposed M66 motorway in 1979, and a supermarket on it at Sowerby Bridge in 1980, both of which were opposed. Progress continued and the eastern section from Sowerby Bridge to the summit at Longlees was open by 1990, although it remained isolated from the canal network, as the connection to the Calder and Hebble Navigation was missing.

Following an Ecotec Report into the costs and benefits of completing the restoration in 1991, Derelict Land Grants were identified as a potential source of funding, and a grant of £2.5 million from this source paved the way for the final link to be restored. The initial plans only made provision for a lock which was 57.5 feet (17.5 m) long, even though all the other locks on the canal were 72 feet (22 m) long, but reworking created space for a standard length lock.

Tuel Lane Lock was built to the west of the original locks 3 and 4, replacing both, and a tunnel was built under the A58 road junction. The first boat to use the lock and make the passage between the restored Rochdale Canal and the Calder and Hebble Navigation did so on 11 April 1996 and the official opening took place on 3 May.

== Operation ==
Due to its extreme depth, operation of the lock by boat crews is not permitted. Passage is controlled by a lock keeper. The lock is situated immediately to the west of the 114-yard (104 m) Tuel Lane Tunnel, and boat crews are advised to wait beyond the tunnel until passage into the lock is clear, as the tunnel is subject to turbulence when the lock is emptying.

Before the opening of Tuel Lane Lock the deepest lock in Britain was Bath Deep Lock, on the Kennet and Avon Canal. This is numbered 8/9 because it replaces two original locks. In this case, a road-widening scheme necessitated one lock, which has a fall of 19 feet 5 inches (5.92 m).

== See also ==
- Canals of the United Kingdom
- History of the British canal system

== Bibliography ==
- Cumberlidge, Jane (2009). Inland Waterways of Great Britain (8th Ed.). Imray Laurie Norie and Wilson. ISBN 978-1-84623-010-3.
- Hadfield, Charles; Biddle, Gordon (1970). The Canals of North West England, Vol 2 (pp. 241–496). David and Charles. ISBN 0-7153-4992-9.
- Nicholson (2006a). Nicholson Waterways Guide (Vol 5): North West and the Pennines. Harper Collins. ISBN 0-00-721113-9.
- Nicholson (2006b). Nicholson Waterways Guide (Vol 7): River Thames and the Southern Waterways. Harper Collins. ISBN 0-00-721115-5.
- Squires, Roger (2008). Britain's restored canals. Landmark Publishing. ISBN 978-1-84306-331-5.
