= Gaddings Dam =

Dam in West Yorkshire, England

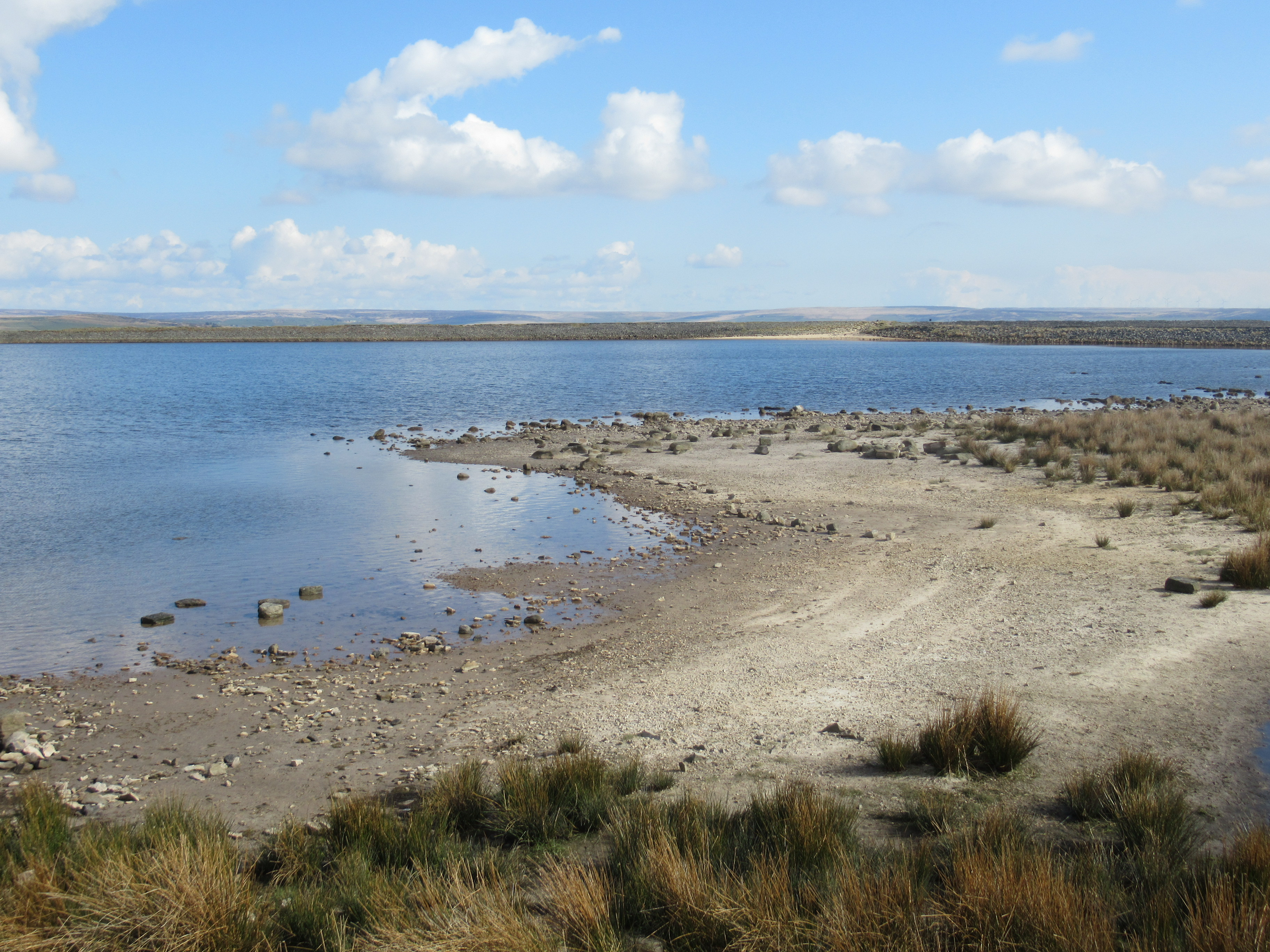
- Beach at Gaddings Dam

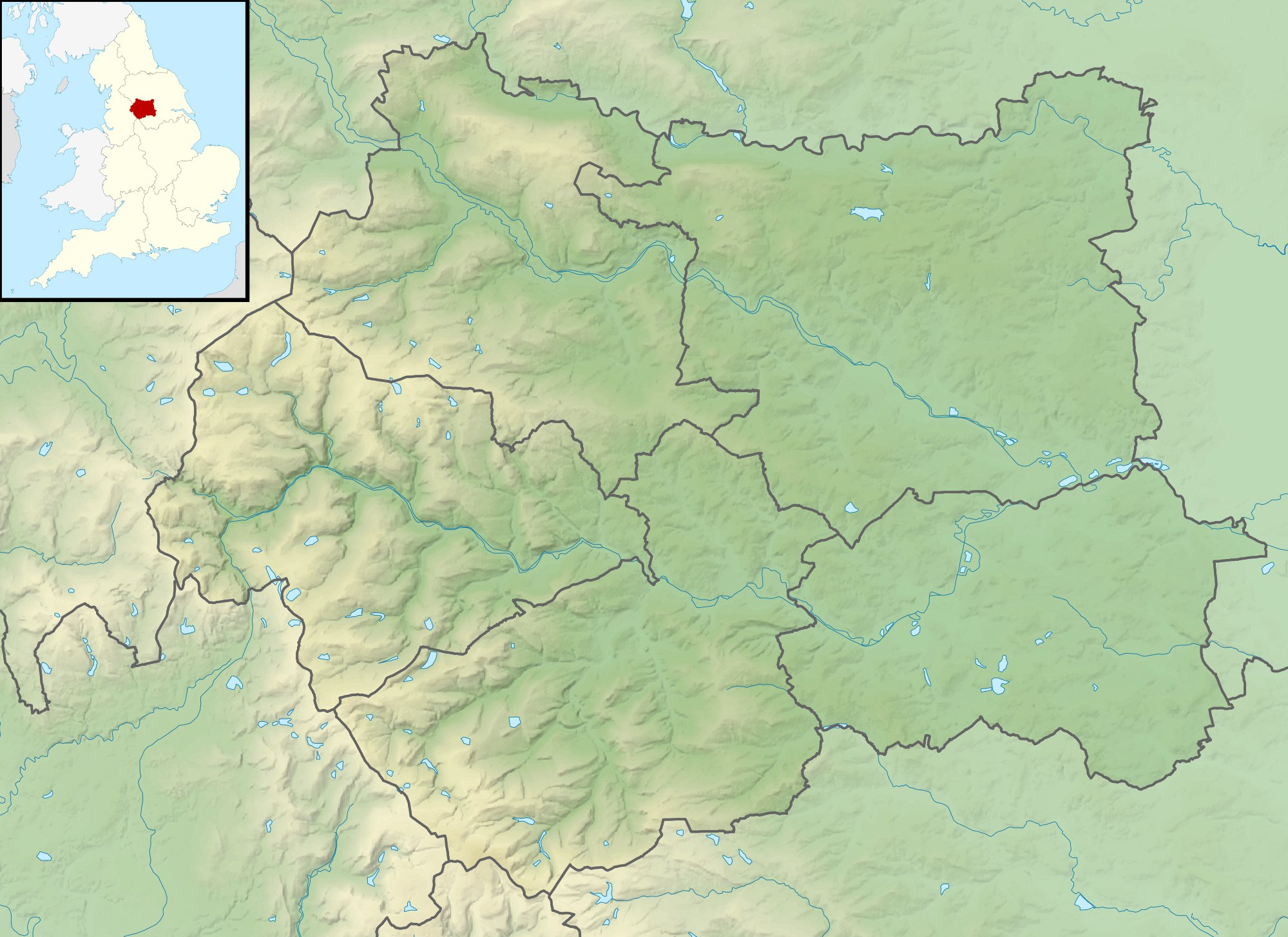
- Location within West Yorkshire
- Location: Lumbutts, Calderdale, West Yorkshire, England.
- Coordinates: 53.698°N 2.079°W
- Type: Reservoir
- Catchment area: 20 acres (8 ha)
- Built: 1830s
- Surface area: 7.4 acres (3 ha)
- Average depth: 12 feet (3.6 m)
- Water volume: 4,342,200 cubic feet (122,957 m^{3})
- Surface elevation: 1,150 feet (350 m)

Gaddings Dam is a locally owned reservoir near to Todmorden in West Yorkshire, England. The dam was built to power water mills in the Todmorden area, being superseded by steam power and left redundant. It is notable for having a sandy beach at the north-eastern side which attracts people to it during the summer months, although it is known for its all-year round wild swimming opportunities. The presence of the sandy shore means the site is often labelled as the "highest beach in Britain", though there are other inland locations with beaches at a higher altitude.

== History ==
Historically, Gaddings Dam was actually two reservoirs built adjacent to each other, with water entering the valley via Lumbutts Clough. The earlier easterly dam was built to supply water to the mill owners in Lumbutts, but in 1824, the owners of the Rochdale Canal agreed to supplement the supply of water with a western dam due to the availability of water for the millworkings. Gaddings is an embankment dam, that has a perimeter of 3,000 feet (900 m), an average depth of 12 feet (3.6 m), a surface area of 7.4 acres (3 ha), and a catchment area of 20 acres (8 ha).

In 1923, the dam (along with many others that fed the Rochdale Canal), was sold to the Oldham and Rochdale Corporations as a freshwater supply reservoir. The easterly dam was described in 1988 as "..having dried up long ago..", leaving just the western dam with water. In 2001, the Gaddings Dam Preservation Company bought the deeds to the dam for £1,500 on condition that the dam was preserved for the local community.

On hot days, people from the local area are known to make the 780-foot (240 m) hike to the dam to cool off (there is no direct road access). Due to its height above sea level (1,150 feet (350 m)), it is often called the "highest beach in Britain", although the owners are quick to point out that this is not true, as many locations in the Lake District have beaches which are higher; even Warland Reservoir, a body of water just to the south-east of Gaddings Dam has a beach at a higher altitude. Even though the dam is known for its year-round wild swimming, the owners and local authorities highlight that there are no changing facilities, toilets, or lifeguards on patrol at the dam. The owners state that the beach has been created by sandstone (the dominant local stone in the area) being broken down by weathering, and being pushed with the prevailing wind to the north-eastern edge of the reservoir. Another possibility for the sand is that it is the broken down remains of stones used for dressing the dam walls.
