= Rochdale Canal =

Trans-Pennine navigable channel in northern England

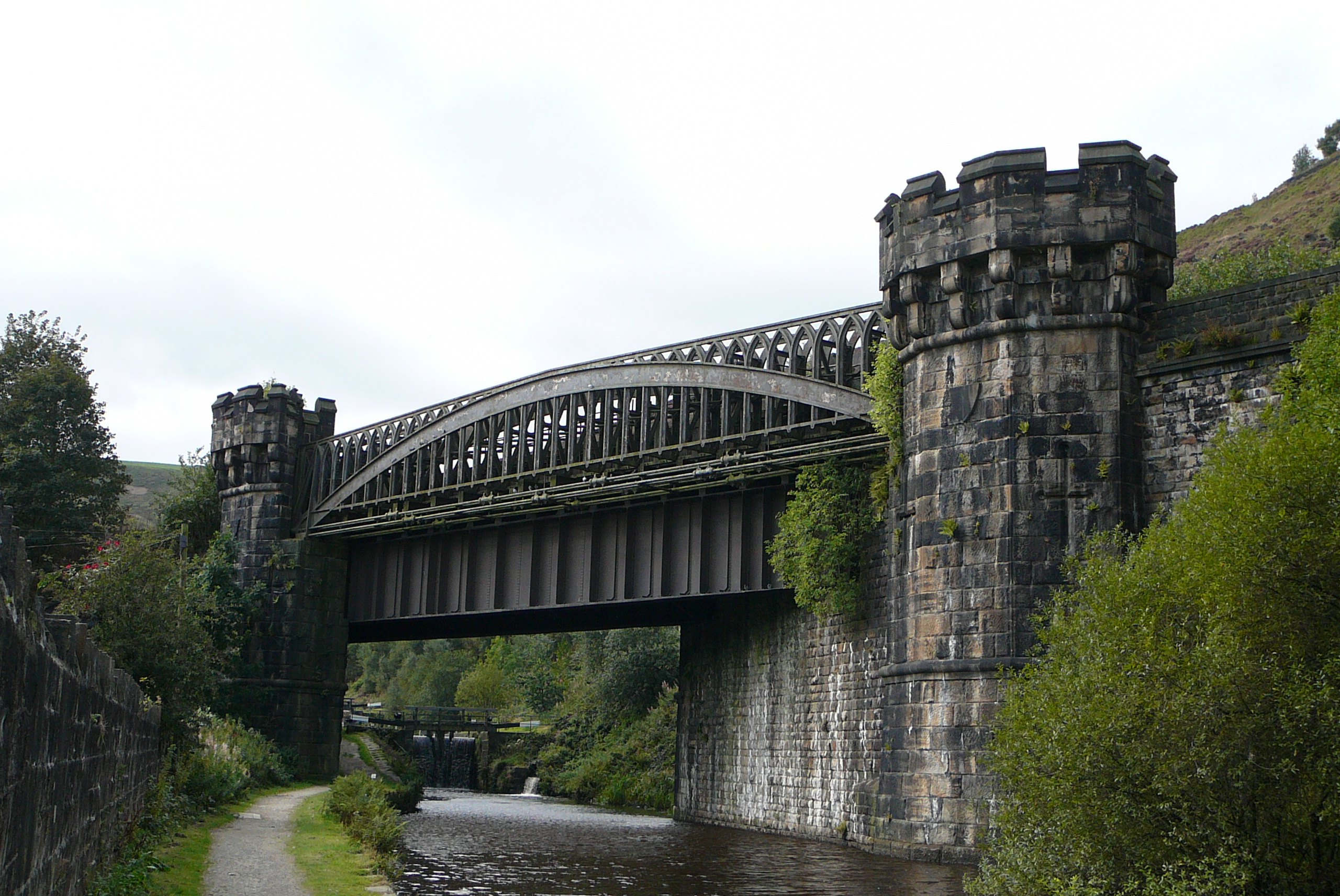
- The castellated railway viaduct of the Manchester and Leeds Railway just south of Todmorden
- Interactive map of Rochdale Canal

Specifications
- Locks: 91 (92 as built; two locks merged)
- Status: Open
- Navigation authority: Canal & River Trust

History
- Date of act: 1794
- Date completed: 1804
- Date closed: 1952
- Date restored: 2002

The Rochdale Canal is in Northern England, between Manchester and Sowerby Bridge, part of the connected system of the canals of Great Britain. Its name refers to the town of Rochdale through which it passes.

The Rochdale is a broad canal because its locks are wide enough to allow vessels of 14 feet (4.3 m) width. The canal runs for 32 miles (51 km) across the Pennines from the Bridgewater Canal at Castlefield Basin in Manchester to join the Calder and Hebble Navigation at Sowerby Bridge in West Yorkshire.

As built, the canal had 92 locks. Whilst the traditional lock numbering has been retained on all restored locks, and on the relocated locks, the canal now has 91. Locks 3 and 4 have been replaced with a single deep lock, Tuel Lane Lock, which is numbered 3/4.

== History ==
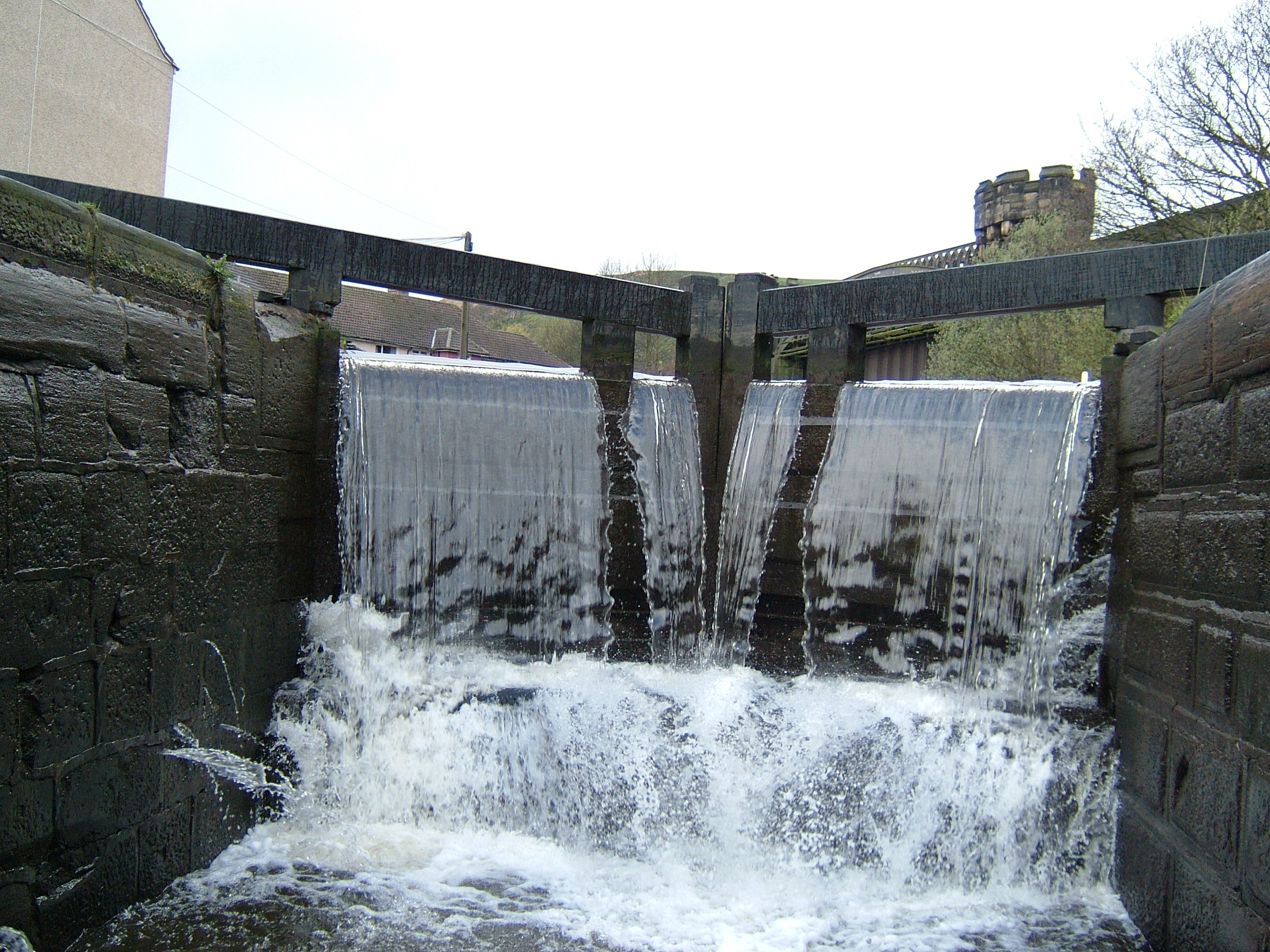
A lock on the Rochdale Canal with water flowing over the gate

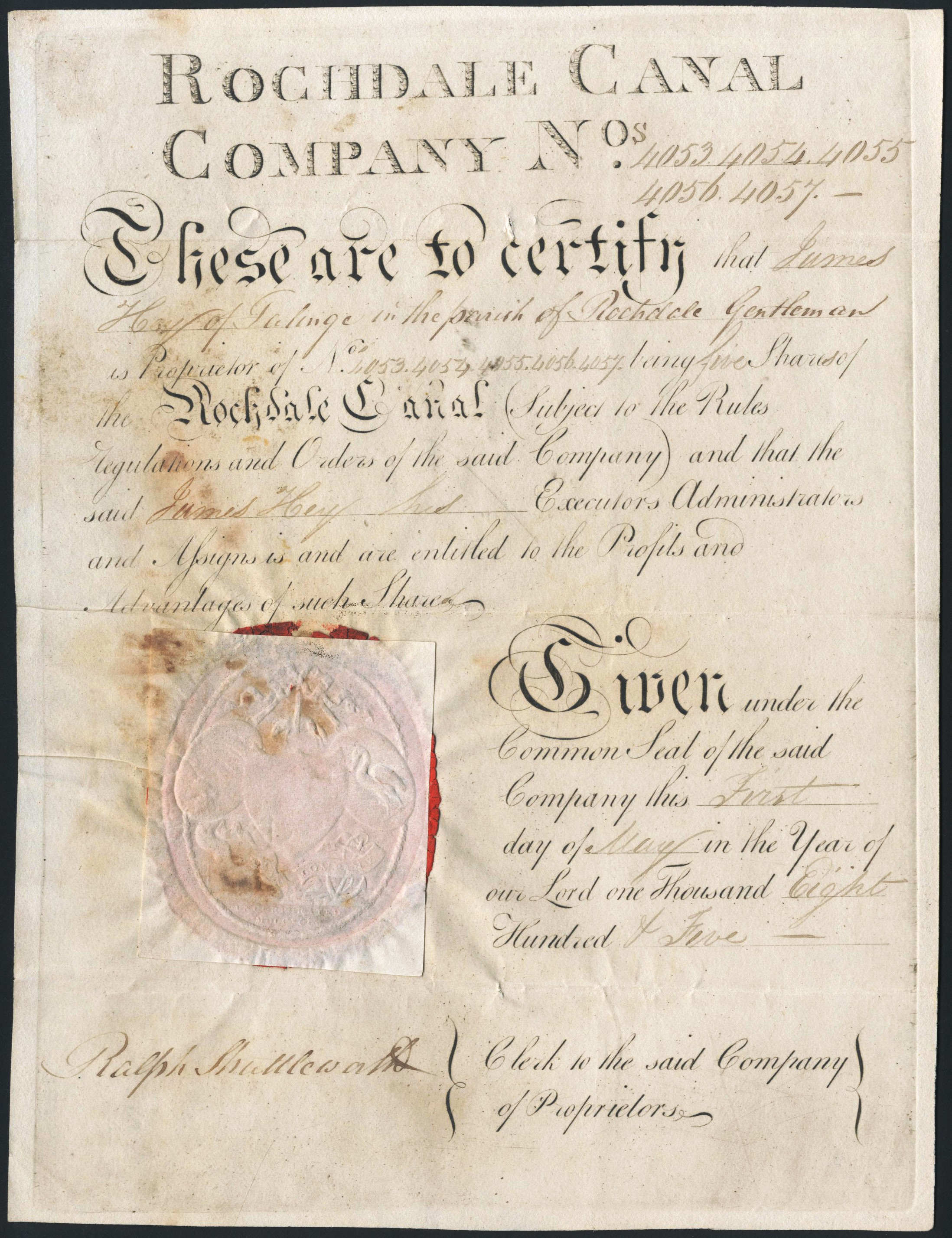
Share of the Rochdale Canal Company, issued 1 May 1805

The Rochdale Canal was conceived in 1776, when a group of 48 men from Rochdale raised £237 and commissioned James Brindley to conduct a survey of possible routes between Sowerby Bridge and Manchester. Brindley proposed a route similar to the one built, and another more expensive route via Bury. Further progress was not made until 1791, when John Rennie was asked to make a new survey in June, and two months later to make surveys for branches to Rochdale, Oldham and to a limeworks near Todmorden. Rennie at the time had no experience of building canals.

Rochdale Canal Act 1794
- Act of Parliament
- Parliament of Great Britain
- Long title: An Act for making and maintaining a navigable canal from the Calder Navigation, at or near Sowerby Bridge wharf, in the parish of Halifax, in the west riding of the county of York, to join the canal of his grace the duke of Bridgewater, in the parish of Manchester, in the county palatine of Lancaster; and also certain cuts from the said intended canal.
- Citation: 34 Geo. 3. c. 78
- Territorial extent: Great Britain

Dates
- Royal assent: 4 April 1794
- Commencement: 4 April 1794 (Note: The Acts of Parliament (Commencement) Act 1793.)
Other legislation
Amended by	Rochdale Canal Act 1800; Rochdale Canal Act 1804; Rochdale Canal Act 1806; Rochdale Canal Act 1807; Rochdale Canal Act 1965
Relates to	Leeds and Liverpool Canal Branch and Railway Act 1819

Status: Amended

Text of statute as originally enacted

The promoters, unsure as to whether to build a wide or a narrow canal, postponed the decision until an act of Parliament had been obtained. The first attempt to obtain an act was made in 1792, but was opposed by mill owners, concerned about water supply. Rennie proposed using steam pumping engines, three in Yorkshire, eight in Lancashire, and one on the Burnley Branch, but the mill owners argued that 59 mills would be affected by the scheme, resulting in unemployment, and the bill was defeated. In September 1792, William Crosley and John Longbotham surveyed the area in an attempt to find locations for reservoirs which would not affect water supplies to the mills. A second bill was presented to Parliament, for a canal which would have a 3,000-yard (2,700 m) tunnel and 11 reservoirs. Again, the bill was defeated, this time by one vote. The promoters, in an attempt to understand the mill owners' position, asked William Jessop to survey the parts of the proposed canal that were causing most concern. Jessop gave evidence to the parliamentary committee, and on 4 April 1794 the Rochdale Canal Act 1794 (34 Geo. 3. c. 78) was obtained which created the Rochdale Canal Company and authorised construction.

Rennie's estimated cost in the second bill was £291,000, and the company was empowered to raise the money by issuing shares, with powers to raise a further £100,000 if required. The estimate was for a narrow canal, whereas the act authorised a broad canal, and so the capital was never going to be adequate. The summit tunnel was abandoned in favour of 14 additional locks saving £20,000. Jessop proposed constructing each lock with a drop of 10 feet (3.0 m), resulting in efficient use of water and the need to manufacture only one size of lock gate.

The canal opened in stages as sections were completed, with the Rochdale Branch the first in 1798 and further sections in 1799. The bottom nine locks opened in 1800 and boats using the Ashton Canal could reach Manchester. Officially, the canal opened in 1804, but construction work continued for three more years. A 1.5-mile (2.4 km) branch from Heywood to Castleton opened in 1834.

=== Operation ===
Rochdale Canal Act 1807
- Act of Parliament
- Parliament of the United Kingdom
- Long title: An Act to alter amend explain and enlarge the Powers of the Acts passed for making and maintaining the Rochdale Canal Navigation.
- Citation: 47 Geo. 3 Sess. 2. c. lxxxi
- Territorial extent: United Kingdom

Dates
- Royal assent: 8 August 1807
- Commencement: 8 August 1807
Other legislation
Amends	Rochdale Canal Act 1794; Rochdale Canal Act 1804; Rochdale Canal Act 1806
Amended by	Rochdale Canal Act 1899; Rochdale Canal Act 1965

Status: Amended

As a result of having no summit tunnel, there were more locks, and the summit pound was very short, at just 0.8 miles (1.3 km). To the north and east, 36 locks descended to Sowerby Bridge, while to the south and west, another 56 locks descended to Castlefield Junction, on the edge of Manchester. The summit pound is 600 feet (183 m) above sea level, and is one of the highest summit pounds in Britain. Blackstone Edge Reservoir, covering 50 acres (20 ha) and Chelburn Reservoir, covering 16 acres (6.5 ha), were the first two reservoirs built to supply the water for all these locks. They were completed in 1798, and Hollingworth Lake, covering 130 acres (53 ha), was finished in 1800. It was lower than the summit pound, and so a steam pumping engine was installed to raise the water into a 4-mile (6.4 km) feeder, which connected to the summit. The feeder was about 45 feet (14 m) above the level of the lake, and the pumping engine was used until 1910, when the installation was demolished. The Rochdale Canal Act 1807 (47 Geo. 3 Sess. 2. c. lxxxi) enabled the 92-acre (37 ha) Whiteholme Reservoir and the 30-acre (12 ha) Light Hazzles Reservoir to be constructed, to ensure that supplies remained adequate as trade increased.

Because of its width, the canal was more successful than the Huddersfield Narrow Canal and became the main highway of commerce between Lancashire and Yorkshire. Cotton, wool, coal, limestone, timber, salt and general merchandise were transported. Between 1830 and 1832, the canal carried 539,081 tons per year, which generated £40,123 in toll revenue. In 1839, this had risen to 875,436 tons, generating £62,712 in tolls, but the opening of the Manchester and Leeds Railway in 1841 caused a significant drop in trade. The following year, £27,266 was earned from the carriage of 667,311 tons, and although a programme of toll reductions succeeded in restoring the trade, the income remained at a similar level for many years. The highest volume of traffic was in 1845, when 979,443 tons were carried.

In 1839, the Manchester and Salford Junction Canal opened, which provided a link between a private branch of the Rochdale Canal and the Mersey and Irwell Navigation. It had been built because around 30,000 tons of goods a year were being transferred between the two waterways by cart, through the streets of Manchester, and the charges for this service did not meet the costs of providing it. It opened on 20 September, but was not a success, as the enabling Act of Parliament had also authorised the Bridgewater Canal to build the Hulme Cut, which linked their canal to the Irwell by three locks, and provided a more convenient route. The eastern end of the canal, with its connection to the Rochdale Canal, closed in 1875, the rest was disused by 1922, and it was abandoned in 1936.

In 1855, the company agreed the terms of a lease with four railway companies, with the largest stake of 73 per cent held by the Lancashire and Yorkshire Railway. The railways paid £37,652 per year for a 21-year period, which allowed the canal company to pay a 4 per cent dividend to its shareholders and still have £15,000 for maintenance work. During the lease period, traffic increased a little, from 754,421 tons to 878,651 tons, and toll revenue also increased, from £23,048 to £28,579. At the end of the 21 years, the arrangement was continued for another fourteen, and four final half-yearly payments of £15,000 were made by way of compensation when the agreement ended. One surprising development was that Hollingworth Lake became a pleasure resort, with steamers operating on it six days a week in 1865. Allegations of "immoralities which it is stated take place in connection with the dancing stages at Hollingworth" in November of that year were strenuously denied by the company in January 1866.

By cutting tolls, the canal managed to retain trade and remain profitable. A series of administrative changes took place, sanctioned by acts of Parliament. The title of the company changed from the Company of Proprietors of the Rochdale Canal to the Rochdale Canal Company, and they were also empowered to sell water. In 1905, cargo moving between the canal and the Bridgewater Canal at the Manchester end amounted to 418,716 tons, most of it connected with the Manchester Ship Canal trade. During the First World War, the government took control of the canals, and when they were handed back in August 1920, the Rochdale was in financial trouble. Sunday and Saturday afternoon working was no longer acceptable, wages had risen and working hours had reduced. In 1923, the Oldham and Rochdale Corporations Water Act 1923 (13 & 14 Geo. 5. c. lxxvii) paved the way for the transfer of its eight reservoirs, Blackstone Edge, Easterly Gaddings Dam, Higher and Lower Chelburn, Hollingworth Lake, Light Hazzles, Warland and Whiteholme, to those corporations to supply drinking water. They received £396,667 for the sale, of which some was paid to the Manchester Ship Canal, since it would no longer receive water from the Rochdale, and made a net profit of £298,333. They could still draw water from some nearby streams and could also draw some from the reservoirs under certain conditions.

Rochdale Canal Act 1952
- Act of Parliament
- Parliament of the United Kingdom
- Long title: An Act to authorise the closing for navigation of part of the Rochdale Canal and for other purposes.
- Citation: 15 & 16 Geo. 6 & 1 Eliz. 2. c. xxxvii
- Territorial extent: United Kingdom

Dates
- Royal assent: 1 August 1952
- Commencement: 1 August 1952
Other legislation
Amended by	Rochdale Canal Act 1965

Status: Amended

Text of statute as originally enacted

Apart from a short profitable section in Manchester linking the Bridgewater and Ashton Canals, most of the length was closed in 1952 when the Rochdale Canal Act 1952 (15 & 16 Geo. 6 & 1 Eliz. 2. c. xxxvii) was obtained to ban public navigation. The last complete journey had taken place in 1937, and by the mid 1960s the remainder was almost unusable. Construction of the M62 motorway in the late 1960s took no account of the canal, cutting it in two.

== Restoration ==
Rochdale Canal Act 1965 (Note: Section 1(1).)
- Act of Parliament
- Parliament of the United Kingdom
- Long title: An Act to authorise the closing for navigation of part of the Rochdale Canal; to make provision as to voting rights, the qualification of directors and the alteration of capital; and for other purposes.
- Citation: 1965 c. xxxvii
- Territorial extent: United Kingdom

Dates
- Royal assent: 5 August 1965
- Commencement: 5 August 1965
Other legislation
Amends	Rochdale Canal Act 1794; Rochdale Canal Act 1800; Rochdale Canal Act 1807; Rochdale Canal Act 1899; Rochdale Canal Act 1952

Status: Current legislation

Text of statute as originally enacted

When an act of Parliament was sought in 1965, to authorise the abandonment of the canal, the Inland Waterways Association petitioned against it, and when it was finally passed, the Rochdale Canal Act 1965 (c. xxxvii) contained a clause that ensured the owners would maintain it until the adjacent Ashton Canal was abandoned. In early 1971, a boat rally was organised on the canal, and later that year, there was public debate over the high cost of a project which had infilled part of the canal to create a shallow water park, when restoring the section for navigation would have been cheaper. Discussion of the relative merits of restoring the canal or the Huddersfield Narrow Canal in 1973 led the formation of societies to promote both schemes in 1974. The Rochdale Canal Society wanted to see the canal fully re-opened, as part of a proposed Pennine Park. The Ashton Canal, which joins the canal above lock 84, reopened in 1974, and the nine locks on the Rochdale Canal between the junction and the Bridgewater Canal were restored at that time.

The canal benefited from the activities of the Manpower Services Commission in 1975, when £40,000 was allocated under the Job Creation Scheme to fund work on the Rochdale town section of the canal. The following year, another 150 jobs were created when a further £208,000 grant was made. Despite the progress, there were plans to sever the route with a low-level crossing by the proposed M66 motorway in 1979, and to build a supermarket on it at Sowerby Bridge in 1980, both of which were met with opposition. One benefit of the Job Creation Scheme was that the perception of the restoration changed in official circles. The local council was responsible for the young people employed on the scheme, which ran for twelve years, and found itself having to negotiate with the canal company. At its height, there were 450 people working on the canal, and since no-one could work on the scheme for more than a year, several thousand people learnt practical restoration skills, and many retained an interest in canals afterwards. The section from Todmorden to Hebden Bridge was completed in 1983 and opened on 20 May.

The Rochdale Canal Society worked hard both to protect the line of the canal and to begin the process of refurbishing it. A new organisational structure was created in 1984, with the formation of the Rochdale Canal Trust Ltd, who leased the canal from the owning company. A proposed extension to the M66 motorway created a new threat to the canal in 1985, but Greater Manchester Council began to look at ways to remove blockages in the following year, particularly the M62 embankment which blocked the route at Failsworth. Calderdale Council managed a £1 million scheme to remove three culverts and restore two locks later that year, with some funding coming from the European Economic Commission. The MSC-funded restoration was approaching Sowerby Bridge, where planners were proposing a tunnel and deep lock to negotiate a difficult road junction at Tuel Lane, so that a connection could be made with the Calder and Hebble Navigation. The entire eastern section from Sowerby Bridge to the summit at Longlees was open by 1990, although it remained isolated from the canal network.

In 1991, an Ecotec Report looked at the costs and benefits of completing the restoration. It estimated that another £15.9 million was needed, but for a total expenditure of £17.3 million, some £30 million of benefits would be gained by the region, including 1,028 full-time jobs. Some of this money would come from Derelict Land Grants. The re-fashioned link with the Calder and Hebble Canal (which had never closed) was funded by £2.5 million from this source. The initial plan included a lock that was only 57.5 feet (17.5 m) long, but space was eventually found for a standard 72-foot (22 m) lock. The first boat to pass between the restored Rochdale Canal and the Calder and Hebble Navigation did so on 11 April 1996, although the official opening did not take place until 3 May. Tuel Lane Lock is nearly 20 feet (6.1 m) deep, making it one of the candidates for the deepest lock on the British canal system.

In 1997, the Rochdale Canal Trust was restructured, in response to announcements that there might be large grants available as part of the millennium celebrations. The canal was still at this point owned by a private company, and the Millennium Commission would not make grants to a scheme which was for private profit, rather than public benefit. The restructuring would allow the Trust to take over responsibility for the canal from the Rochdale Canal Company. However, the plan was rejected by the Commission, and in order to access the grant of £11.3 million, the Waterways Trust took over ownership of the canal. Additional funding to make up a £23.8 million investment package came from English Partnerships and the councils of Oldham and Rochdale. As restoration proceeded, boats could travel further and further west, and the restoration of the sections through Failsworth and Ancoats were a significant part of the re-development of the north Manchester districts. The restored sections joined up with the section in Manchester below the Ashton Canal junction, which had never been closed, and on 1 July 2002 the canal was open for navigation along its entire length.

== Today ==
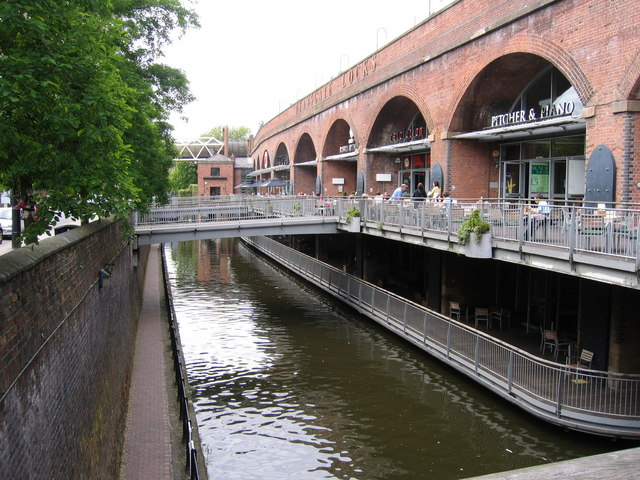
The canal passes through Manchester city centre, seen here by the "Deansgate Locks" bars.

The Rochdale Canal is significant for leisure boating in that it is one of the three canals which cross the Pennines and thus join north-western canals with the waterways of the North East, as well as opening the possibilities of touring various Pennine Rings (the Huddersfield Narrow Canal had reopened the year before, and the Leeds and Liverpool Canal had never closed).

The Rochdale climbs high over the Pennine moors rather than tunnelling through them.

The Rochdale is at the heart of several important leisure boating routes

- In Manchester, the Rochdale Canal connects the Ashton Canal to the Bridgewater Canal and is thus a short link in the Cheshire Ring, a one- (or better, two-) week canal ring which has been popular for 30 years.
- The Ashton Canal connects to the western end of the Huddersfield Narrow Canal, making the Rochdale Canal part of the South Pennine Ring.
- The Bridgewater Canal connects to the western end of the Leeds and Liverpool Canal, making the Rochdale Canal part of the North Pennine Ring.
- The Ashton and the Bridgewater connect the Rochdale to all the canals on the west side of England, including the Trent and Mersey Canal and Macclesfield Canal.

East from Manchester, it crosses the Pennines via the hill towns and villages of Littleborough, Summit, Todmorden, Hebden Bridge, Mytholmroyd and Luddendenfoot (where Branwell Brontë was a railway booking clerk). Finally, at Sowerby Bridge, its connection with the Calder and Hebble gives boats access to all the north-eastern waterways including the Aire and Calder Navigation, the Sheffield and South Yorkshire Navigation, and the rivers Ouse and Trent (and, for boaters who wish to do a "ring", the eastern ends of the Huddersfield Narrow and Leeds and Liverpool canals).

The Rochdale has had many problems since reopening (often related to a shortage of water, because the canal's reservoirs had been sold off in 1923). In April 2005 the canal bank was breached between lock 60 and lock 63, near the River Irk. A large volume of water surged down the river towards the nearby town of Middleton, echoing the great Middleton canal tragedy of 1927, when a breach occurred at the aqueduct, and three people were drowned. The canal re-opened in summer 2006, but had problems throughout the season.

The high frequency of navigation restrictions (and the need to book passage through Tuel Lane lock, and across the summit pound) means that anyone planning to use the canal should consult the Canal & River Trust website.

== See also ==
- Canals of the United Kingdom
- History of the British canal system
- Lindsay Rimer, a 13-year-old girl found murdered in the canal in 1994

== Bibliography ==
- Colligan, A. W. (1977). The Weighver's Seaport – The story of Hollingworth Lake. G Kelsall. ISBN 0-9505577-0-6.
- Cumberlidge, Jane (2009). Inland Waterways of Great Britain (8th ed.). Imray Laurie Norie and Wilson. ISBN 978-1-84623-010-3.
- Hadfield, Charles; Biddle, Gordon (1970a). The Canals of North West England, Vol 1 (pp. 1–236). David and Charles. ISBN 0-7153-4956-2.
- Hadfield, Charles; Biddle, Gordon (1970b). The Canals of North West England, Vol 2 (pp. 241–496). David and Charles. ISBN 0-7153-4992-9.
- Pearson, Michael (1995). Pearson's Canal Companion; Pennine waters. Tatenhill Common: J. M. Pearson. ISBN 0-9545383-4-X.
- Priestley, Joseph (1831). Historical Account of the Navigable Rivers, Canals and Railways of Great Britain.
- Squires, Roger (2008). Britain's restored canals. Landmark Publishing. ISBN 978-1-84306-331-5.
