= List of locks on the Grand Union Canal =

A list of locks on the Grand Union Canal and its branches.

== Grand Union Canal (Main Line) ==
The Grand Union Canal (Main Line) runs from Salford Junction, Birmingham to Brentford, London. Locks have a beam of 14 feet except locks 52 to 64 in Birmingham. The numbering of locks originates at Braunston, and increases both towards the north, to Lock 64, and the south, to Lock 101.

Locks on the Grand Union Canal (Main Line)
Lock number	Lock name	Rise or fall of lock(s) (heading south)	Co-ordinates	Notes
Salford Junction to Napton
64	Nechells Shallow Lock or Salford Shallow Lock	–	52°30′21.4″N 1°51′30.5″W	7’ beam, gates removed
59 – 63	Garrison Locks or Saltley Locks	+34’ 5”	52°29′08.6″N 1°51′47.7″W	7’ beam. Between Garrison Top Lock (59) and Camp Hill Bottom Lock (57) is Bordesley Junction connecting to the Digbeth Branch.
58	Stop lock Digbeth branch	–		Abolished
52 – 57	Camp Hill Locks	+41’ 8”	52°28′20.9″N 1°52′34.7″W	7’ beam
47 – 51	Knowle Locks	–41’ 10”	52°22′57.8″N 1°43′20.2″W	Between Knowle Bottom Lock (47) and Hatton Top Lock (46) is Kingswood Junction connecting to the Stratford-upon-Avon Canal.
46	Hatton Top Lock	-146’ 6”	52°17′57.2″N 1°39′02.5″W	Between Knowle Bottom Lock (47) and Hatton Top Lock (46) is Kingswood Junction connecting to the Stratford-upon-Avon Canal.
27 – 45	Hatton Locks	-146’ 6”	52°17′58.5″N 1°38′41.4″W	
26	Hatton Bottom Lock	-146’ 6”	52°17′13.6″N 1°36′39.2″W	Between Hatton Bottom Lock (26) and Cape Top Lock (25) is Budbrooke Junction connecting to the Saltisford Arm.
24 – 25	Cape Locks	−14’ 4”	52°17′33.2″N 1°35′41.6″W	Between Hatton Bottom Lock (26) and Cape Top Lock (25) is Budbrooke Junction connecting to the Saltisford Arm.
23	Radford Bottom Lock	+7’ 0”	52°16′53.6″N 1°29′07.0″W	
20 – 22	Fosse Locks	+21’ 0”	52°16′35.9″N 1°28′07.2″W	
19	Wood Lock	+6’ 7”	52°16′18.4″N 1°26′57.3″W	
18	Welsh Road Lock	+6’ 11”	52°16′21.6″N 1°26′09.8″W	
14 – 17	Bascote Locks	+26’ 9”	52°16′26.7″N 1°25′17.1″W	Locks 14 & 15 are a staircase lock
13	Itchington Bottom Lock	+6’ 7”	52°16′43.9″N 1°23′10.6″W	
5 – 12	Stockton Locks	+54’ 7”	52°16′49.2″N 1°22′08.6″W	
4	Stockton Top Lock	+54’ 7”	52°16′53.7″N 1°21′54.5″W	
1 – 3	Calcut Locks	+16’ 2”	52°16′05.3″N 1°18′57.9″W	Between Calcut Top Lock (1) and Braunston Bottom Lock (1) are: Napton Junction connecting to the Oxford Canal (south); and Braunston Junction connecting to the Oxford Canal (north).
Napton to Braunton – Oxford Canal (no locks)
Braunston to Brentford
1	Braunston Bottom Lock	+35’ 6”	52°17′20.8″N 1°12′09.9″W	
2 – 5	Braunston Lock Flight	+35’ 6”	52°17′14.0″N 1°11′40.6″W	
6	Braunston Top Lock	+35’ 6”	52°17′10.4″N 1°11′28.4″W	Between Braunston Top Lock (6) and Buckby Top Lock (7) is Norton Junction connecting to the Leicester Section.
7	Buckby Top Lock	-63’ 0”	52°17′08.4″N 1°06′49.5″W	Between Braunston Top Lock (6) and Buckby Top Lock (7) is Norton Junction connecting to the Leicester Section.
8 – 12	Buckby Lock Flight	-63’ 0”	52°16′44.9″N 1°05′52.5″W	
13	Buckby Bottom Lock	-63’ 0”	52°16′24.8″N 1°05′43.0″W	Between Buckby Bottom Lock (13) and Stoke Bruerne Locks (14) is Gayton Junction connecting to the Northampton Arm.
14 – 15	Stoke Bruerne Locks	-16’ 0”	52°08′31.3″N 0°54′53.3″W	Between Buckby Bottom Lock (13) and Stoke Bruerne Locks (14) is Gayton Junction connecting to the Northampton Arm.
16 – 20	Stoke Bruerne Locks	-40’ 0”	52°08′11.8″N 0°54′30.0″W	
21	Cosgrove Lock	-3’ 4”	52°04′22.8″N 0°50′29.7″W	
22	Fenny Stratford Lock	+1’ 1”	52°00′02.7″N 0°42′51.6″W	
23	Stoke Hammond Lock	+6’ 11”	51°57′40.8″N 0°42′39.3″W	
24 – 26	Soulbury Three Locks	+20’ 3”	51°56′49.0″N 0°42′16.2″W	
27	Leighton Lock	+6’ 8”	51°55′36.8″N 0°39′54.1″W	
28	Grove Lock	+7’ 6”	51°53′53.5″N 0°40′17.0″W	
29	Church Lock	+6’ 9”	51°53′35.6″N 0°39′44.9″W	
30	Slapton Lock	+7’ 1”	51°52′23.8″N 0°39′08.0″W	
31	Horton Lock	+6’ 9”	51°52′00.1″N 0°38′55.1″W	
32 – 33	Ivinghoe Locks	+14’ 3”	51°51′26.7″N 0°38′48.0″W	
34 – 36	Seabrook Locks	+20’ 4”	51°50′45.6″N 0°38′38.5″W	
37 – 38	Marsworth Locks	+14’ 4”	51°49′42.2″N 0°39′39.1″W	Between Marsworth Lock (38) and Marsworth Lock (39) is Marsworth Junction connecting to the Aylesbury Arm.
39 – 45	Marsworth Locks	+42’ 3”	51°48′57.2″N 0°39′15.3″W	Bulbourne, summit, 473 feet (144 metres) above Thames Locks.
46	Cowroast Lock	-6’ 0”	51°47′01.0″N 0°36′44.3″W	Between Marsworth Lock (45) and Cow Roast Lock (46) is Bulbourne Junction connecting to the Wendover Arm.
47 – 48	Dudswell Locks	-13’ 4”	51°46′46.6″N 0°36′18.1″W	
49	Northchurch Lock	-26’ 11”	51°46′16.6″N 0°35′19.0″W	Northchurch Locks
50	Bushes Lock	-26’ 11”	51°46′03.6″N 0°34′56.2″W	Northchurch Locks
51	Gas 1 Lock	-26’ 11”	51°45′55.4″N 0°34′23.5″W	Northchurch Locks
52	Gas 2 Lock	-26’ 11”	51°45′53.4″N 0°34′17.8″W	Northchurch Locks
53	Berkhamsted Lock	-16’ 10”	51°45′44.6″N 0°33′50.5″W	Berkhamsted Locks
54	Ravens Lock	-16’ 10”	51°45′37.2″N 0°33′26.1″W	Berkhamsted Locks
55	Rising Sun Lock	-16’ 10”	51°45′33.0″N 0°33′22.6″W	Berkhamsted Locks
56	Top Side Lock	-19’ 4”	51°45′18.4″N 0°32′40.7″W	Bourne End Locks
57	Bottom Side Lock	-19’ 4”	51°45′09.0″N 0°32′22.8″W	Bourne End Locks
58	Sewer Lock	-19’ 4”	51°45′03.2″N 0°32′03.7″W	Bourne End Locks
59	Bourne End Bottom Lock	-7’ 4”	51°44′50.6″N 0°31′24.5″W	
60	Winkwell Lock	-13’ 7”	51°44′50.6″N 0°31′24.6″W	
61	Winkwell Bottom Lock	-13’ 7”	51°44′47.1″N 0°30′44.6″W	
62	Boxmoor Top Lock	-6’ 8”	51°44′42.1″N 0°30′02.7″W	
63	Fishery Lock	-7’ 1”	51°44′39.1″N 0°29′29.6″W	
64	Boxmoor Lock	-7’ 1”	51°44′35.2″N 0°28′34.1″W	
65 – 67	Apsley Locks	-16’ 0”	51°44′10.7″N 0°27′49.5″W	
68	Nash Mills Lock	-12’ 2”	51°43′46.9″N 0°27′13.7″W	Nash Mills Locks
69	Red Lion Lock	-12’ 2”	51°43′40.1″N 0°27′09.4″W	Nash Mills Locks
69A	Kings Langley Lock	-8’ 9”	51°42′50.5″N 0°26′40.0″W	
70	Home Park Lock	-5’ 2”	51°42′25.2″N 0°26′31.0″W	
71	North Grove Lock	-6' 11"	51°41′58.2″N 0°26′19.9″W	
72 – 73	Hunton Bridge Locks	-11’ 2”	51°41′26.1″N 0°26′05.6″W	
74	Lady Capel's Lock	-5’ 4”	51°40′52.7″N 0°25′53.6″W	
75 – 76	Cassiobury Park Locks	-10’ 0”	51°40′19.6″N 0°25′35.1″W	
77	Iron Bridge Lock	-9’ 4”	51°39′51.7″N 0°25′36.6″W	
78	Cassio Bridge Lock	-9’ 0”	51°39′16.2″N 0°25′39.5″W	
79	Common Moor Lock	-9’ 5”	51°38′43.1″N 0°26′19.2″W	
80	Lot Mead Lock	-6’ 3”	51°38′17.0″N 0°27′03.4″W	
81	Batchworth Lock	-6’ 8”	51°38′05.7″N 0°27′58.8″W	
82	Stocker's Lock	-5’ 2”	51°37′48.3″N 0°28′52.4″W	
83	Springwell Lock	-7’ 11”	51°37′32.0″N 0°29′40.9″W	
84	Copper Mill Lock	-5’ 10”	51°36′38.9″N 0°29′54.3″W	
85	Black Jack's Lock	-3’ 8”	51°36′09.0″N 0°29′43.2″W	
86	Widewater Lock	-8’ 0”	51°35′15.4″N 0°29′09.8″W	
87	Denham Deep Lock	-11’ 1”	51°33′55.1″N 0°28′56.0″W	
88	Uxbridge Lock	-4’ 7”	51°33′08.6″N 0°29′00.7″W	
89	Cowley Lock	-6’ 6”	51°31′44.1″N 0°29′08.4″W	Between Cowley Lock (89) and Norwood Top Lock (90) are: Cowley Peachey Junction connecting to the Slough Arm (no locks); and Bulls Bridge Junction connecting to the Paddington Arm (no locks).
90	Norwood Top Lock	-7’ 10”	51°30′06.6″N 0°21′47.4″W	Between Cowley Lock (89) and Norwood Top Lock (90) are: Cowley Peachey Junction connecting to the Slough Arm (no locks); and Bulls Bridge Junction connecting to the Paddington Arm (no locks).
91 – 97	Hanwell Locks	-53’ 2”	51°30′19.5″N 0°20′50.5″W	
98	Osterley Lock	-5’ 7”	51°29′48.6″N 0°19′57.6″W	
99	Clitheroe's Lock	-7’ 7”	51°29′20.3″N 0°19′17.3″W	
100	Brentford Gauging Locks	-5’ 6”	51°28′59.3″N 0°18′41.7″W	
101	Thames Locks	Tidal	51°28′55.8″N 0°18′17.3″W	Into tidal River Thames

== Grand Union Canal branches ==
The Paddington Arm and the Slough Arm have no locks.

The Wendover Arm Canal has one stop lock.

The Aylesbury Arm has 16 locks, see Aylesbury Canal Society.

The Leicester Branch from Norton Junction to the River Trent has 59 locks, see table.

The Welford Arm, off the Leicester Branch, has one lock, Welford Lock with a rise of 3’ 6”.

The Northampton Arm from Gayton Junction to the River Nene has 17 locks, see table.

=== Locks on the Leicester Branch ===
Locks on the Leicester Branch
Lock number	Lock name	Rise or fall of lock(s) (heading north)	Co-ordinates	Notes
1	Watford Bottom Lock	+52’ 6”	52°11′52.7″N 0°56′39.6″W	
2 – 7	Watford Locks	+52’ 6”	52°18′49.7″N 1°07′54.8″W	3 – 6 are staircase locks
8 – 17	Foxton Locks	-75’ 0”	52°30′00.9″N 0°58′58.5″W	Two staircases of five locks each.
18	Kibworth Top Lock	-7’ 7”	52°32′37.9″N 1°01′54.5″W	
19	Kibworth Second (or Gas Pipe) Lock	-7’ 2”	52°32′45.7″N 1°01′36.9″W	
20	Taylor's Turnover Lock	-5’ 5”	52°32′49.4″N 1°01′32.2″W	
21	Pywell's Lock	-7’ 5”	52°32′55.5″N 1°01′31.2″W	
22	Crane's Lock	-5’ 9”	52°33′13.1″N 1°01′52.4″W	
23	Newton Top Lock	-5’ 6”	52°33′53.0″N 1°03′40.8″W	
24	Spinney Lock	-6’ 9”	52°33′51.6″N 1°03′57.4″W	
25	Top Half Mile Lock	-7’ 2”	52°33′49.1″N 1°04′12.3″W	
26	Bottom Half Mile Lock	-6’ 9”	52°33′32.7″N 1°04′46.3″W	
27	Turnover Lock	-7’ 5”	52°33′33.5″N 1°04′51.9″W	
28	Tythorne Lock	-6’ 9”	52°33′36.4″N 1°05′10.7″W	
29	Bumblebee Lock	-6’ 2”	52°33′43.2″N 1°05′21.1″W	
30	Kilby Lock	-6’ 4”	52°34′05.5″N 1°06′36.5″W	
31	Double Rail Lock	-7’ 9”	52°34′05.2″N 1°07′04.6″W	
32	Ervin's Lock	-7’ 0”	52°34′26.6″N 1°07′27.5″W	
33	Bush Lock	-7’ 7”	52°34′34.7″N 1°08′24.1″W	
34	Dunn's Lock	-6’ 4”	52°34′52.5″N 1°09′26.6″W	
35	Whetstone Lane Lock	-6’ 4”	52°34′56.9″N 1°10′01.2″W	
36	Gee's Lock	-7’ 2”	52°35′11.1″N 1°10′40.5″W	
37	Blue Banks Lock	-7’ 2”	52°35′26.4″N 1°10′18.0″W	
38	Kings Lock	-7’ 9”	52°36′05.9″N 1°09′51.3″W	
39	Aylestone Mill Lock	-6’ 5”	52°36′34.9″N 1°08′51.8″W	
40	St Mary's Mill Lock	-3’ 6”	52°37′03.6″N 1°08′54.3″W	
41	Freeman's Meadow Lock	-6’ 5”	52°37′17.2″N 1°08′41.4″W	
42	North Lock	-4’ 7”	52°38′27.5″N 1°08′35.5″W	
43	Limekiln Lock	-4’ 3”	52°38′43.7″N 1°07′46.3″W	
44	Belgrave Lock	-3’ 11”	52°39′15.0″N 1°07′41.7″W	Joins River Soar
45	Birstall Lock	-3’ 4”	52°40′25.2″N 1°06′57.1″W	
46	Thurmaston Lock	-3’ 2”	52°40′45.1″N 1°06′05.8″W	Leaves River Soar
47	Junction Lock	-4’ 9”	52°42′24.6″N 1°06′30.7″W	
48	Cossington Lock	-5’ 3”	52°42′37.2″N 1°07′15.4″W	Joins River Soar
49	Sileby Lock	-4’ 6”	52°43′37.2″N 1°07′25.6″W	
50	Mountsorrel Lock	-4’ 1”	52°43′54.4″N 1°08′22.5″W	
51	Barrow Deep Lock	-9’ 7”	52°44′59.1″N 1°09′08.5″W	
52	Pilling's Flood Lock		52°45′30.7″N 1°09′50.2″W	
53	Loughborough Lock	-6’ 9”	52°46′49.1″N 1°12′58.5″W	
54	Bishop Meadow Lock	-8’ 7”	52°47′22.6″N 1°13′00.5″W	
55	Zouch Lock	-6’ 4”	52°48′23.4″N 1°15′22.6″W	
56	Kegworth Deep Lock	-7’ 9”	52°50′11.5″N 1°16′16.1″W	
57	Kegworth Shallow (flood) Lock		52°50′26.2″N 1°16′03.7″W	
58	Ratcliffe Lock	-6’ 8”	52°51′31.1″N 1°16′18.7″W	
59	Redhill Lock (flood lock)		52°52′05.7″N 1°16′12.9″W	River Trent

The lock numbering sequence of the Leicester Branch continues along the Erewash Canal. From Lock 60 Trent Lock north to Lock 74 at Eastwood.

=== Locks on the Northampton Arm ===
From Gayton Junction the Northampton Arm descends to the River Nene.

Locks on the Northampton Arm
Lock number	Lock name	Fall of lock (heading to River Nene)	Co-ordinates	Notes
1	Rothersthorpe Top Lock	-79' 10"	52°11′52.7″N 0°56′39.6″W	
2 – 12	Rothersthorpe Locks	-79' 10"	52°12′13.6″N 0°56′21.6″W	
13	Rothersthorpe Bottom Lock	-79' 10"	52°12′37.0″N 0°56′18.5″W	
14	Wootton Lock	-6' 9"	52°12′59.5″N 0°56′28.1″W	
15	Hardingstone Lock	-6' 3"	52°13′33.2″N 0°55′59.5″W	
16	Huinsbury Lock	-6' 10"	52°13′43.6″N 0°54′48.2″W	
17	Northampton Lock	-5' 0"	52°13′48.6″N 0°53′57.2″W	River Nene

== See also ==
- Grand Union Canal
