= Shrewley Tunnel =

Canal tunnel in Warwickshire, England

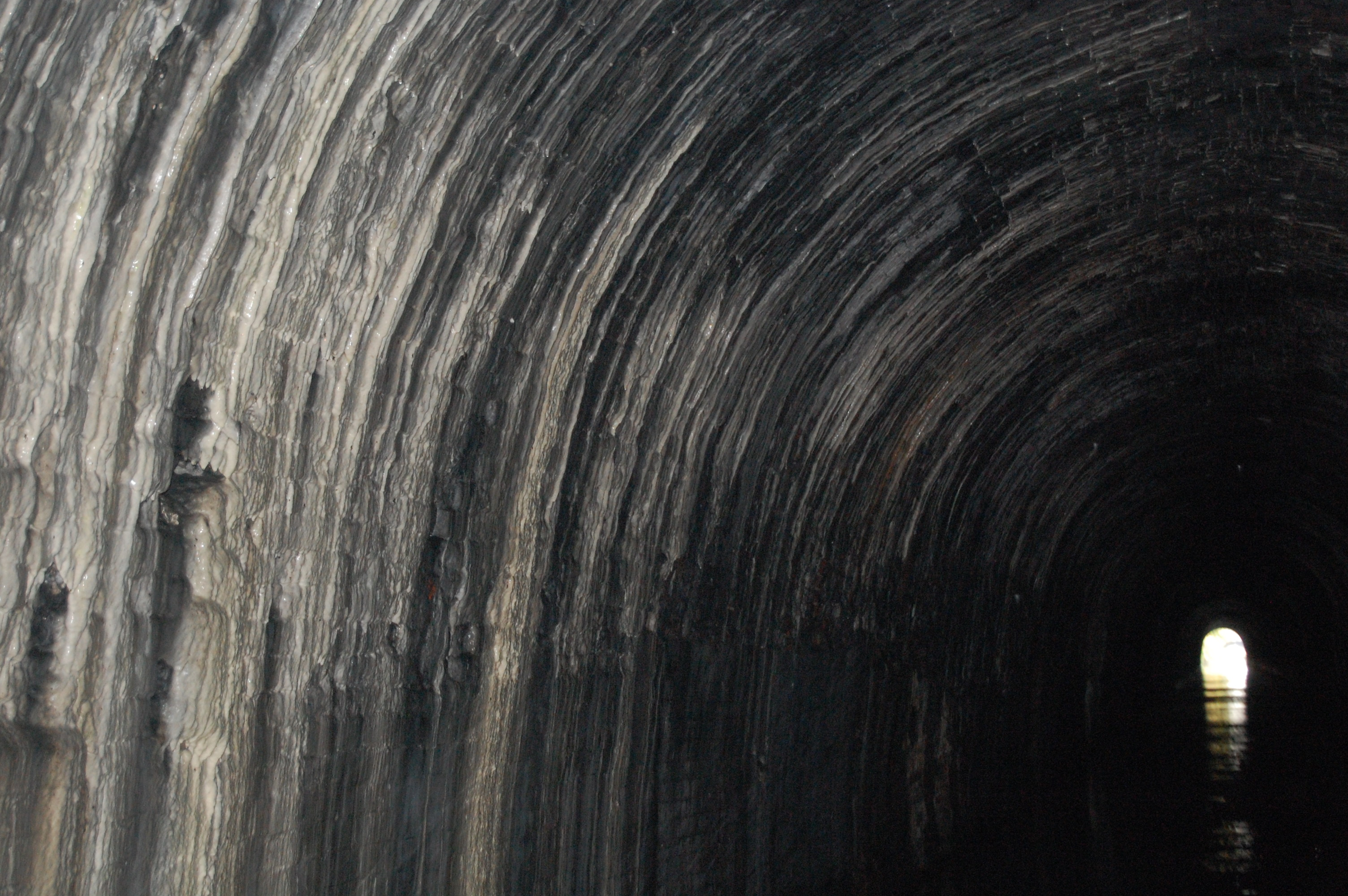
- Northern entrance to Shrewley Tunnel
- Interactive map of Shrewley Tunnel

Overview
- Location: Shrewley, Warwickshire, England
- Coordinates: 52.302598°N 1.687555°W
- OS grid reference: SP213672
- Status: Open
- Waterway: Grand Union Canal

Operation
- Opened: 1799
- Owner: British Waterways

Technical
- Length: 433 yards (395.9 m)
- Towpath: No (Separate tunnel)
- Boat-passable: Yes

Shrewley Tunnel is a canal tunnel near Shrewley, Warwickshire, England, which opened in 1799. It became part of the Grand Union Canal in 1929.

== History ==
The Warwick and Birmingham Canal Company obtained an act of Parliament, the Warwick and Birmingham Canal Act 1793 (33 Geo. 3. c. 38), in March 1793, which authorised the construction of a 22.6-mile (36.4 km) canal from the Digbeth Branch Canal of the Birmingham Canal Navigations to Warwick, where it would end at Saltisford Wharf. The plans showed three tunnels, at Shrewley, Rowington and Yardley, but as construction progressed, the last two became deep cuttings. This was not an option at Shrewley, as the route passed under the village. The plans also specified that the tunnel would be suitable for boats but not barges, implying that it would have been suitable for 7-foot (2.1 m) narrow boats, common on the Birmingham system, but not for wider craft. However, construction of the Grand Junction Canal, which would provide a link to London, was started at a similar time, and the committee wisely took the decision in April 1794 to increase the width of the tunnel to 16 feet (4.9 m), allowing wide barges to pass through it. The width of the bridge holes was similarly increased to 21 feet (6.4 m) in May.

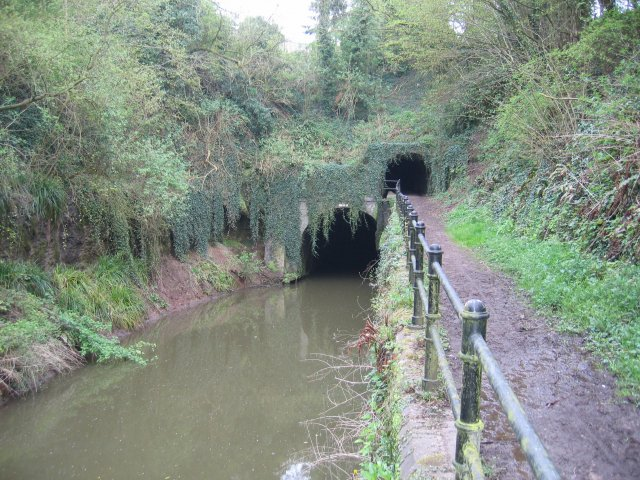
Northern entrance to the canal and accompanying horse tunnel

The tunnel is 433 yards (396 m) long, built of brick and is wide enough for two narrow boats to pass each other, although it has no towpath inside. It officially opened on 19 December 1799 when the rest of the Warwick and Birmingham Canal was completed, although no trading took place until the following March. It became part of the Grand Union Canal in 1929 following the amalgamation of the canal company with several others, including the Grand Junction.

There are actually two tunnels: at the northern portal, the towpath splits off and rises on a ramp and then enters a tunnel of its own, until it reaches the road which crosses the tunnel; having crossed this the path then descends on another ramp to reach the southern portal. The interior of the tunnel is unusually wet and this has led to the creation of flowstone formations.

== Location ==
The tunnel runs from the south-east to the north-west. From the northern portal, the canal is level for 6.5 miles (10.5 km) to the bottom of a flight of five locks at Knowle, which raise the level of the canal by 41.8 feet (12.7 m). Kingswood Junction, which connects to the Stratford-upon-Avon Canal occurs about halfway along this stretch. To the south, the canal is level for around 1.7 miles (2.7 km) to Hatton Top Lock, the first of a flight of 21 locks which drop the level by 146.5 feet (44.7 m) to reach Warwick.

== Coordinates ==
Point	Coordinates (Links to map resources)	OS Grid Ref	Notes
North portal	52.303871°N 1.689460°W	SP211673	
Mid-point	52.302598°N 1.687555°W	SP213672	
South portal	52.301325°N 1.685650°W	SP214671	

== See also ==
- Legging (canals)
- List of canal tunnels in Great Britain

== Bibliography ==
- Cumberlidge, Jane (2009). Inland Waterways of Great Britain (8th Ed.). Imray Laurie Norie and Wilson. ISBN 978-1-84623-010-3.
- Hadfield, Charles (1970). The Canals of the East Midlands. David and Charles. ISBN 0-7153-4871-X.
- Nicholson (2006). Nicholson Guides Vol 1: Grand Union, Oxford and the South East. Harper Collins. ISBN 978-0-00-721109-8.
- Pearson (1993). Pearson's Canal Companion: South Midlands and Warwickshire Ring. ISBN 0-907864-62-7.
