= Bascote Locks =

Coordinates: 52°16′28″N 1°25′24″W

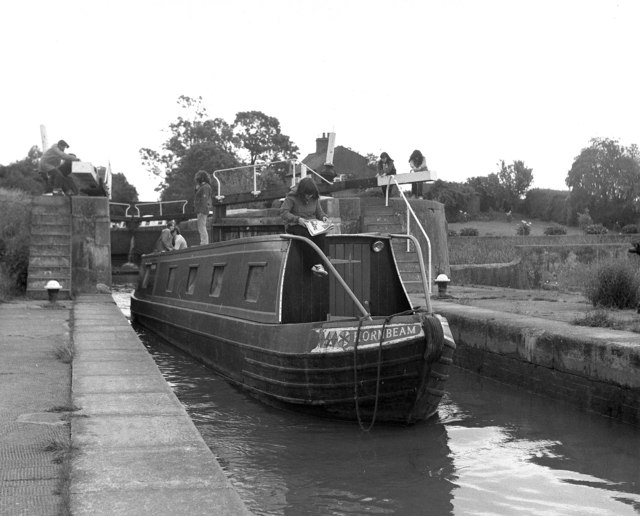
- A narrow boat in 1979 entering lock 15, the bottom half of the staircase pair.
- Waterway: Grand Union Canal
- County: Warwickshire
- Maintained by: Canal & River Trust
- Operation: Mechanical
- First built: 1800
- Latest built: 1930s
- Length: 83 feet 6 inches (25.5 m)
- Width: 15 feet (4.6 m)
- Fall: 26 feet 6 inches (8.08 m)

Bascote locks form a flight of four locks on the Grand Union Canal, which is part of the British canal system and connects London and Birmingham. The lock flight has a staircase, and at the highest lock the remains of older narrow locks can be seen.

== History ==
The locks are on a section of canal which was originally part of the Warwick and Napton Canal. When authorised by an Act of Parliament in 1794, it was intended to be a 17.8-mile (28.6 km) canal from a junction with the Warwick and Birmingham Canal at Warwick to the Grand Junction Canal at Braunston, and was called the Warwick and Braunston Canal. Construction began in 1795, but in August a yeoman from Barford called Charles Handley suggested that £50,000 could be saved if the canal terminated at Napton on the Oxford Canal instead of Braunston. A second act was obtained in 1796, authorising a new route from near Offchurch, where the canal crossed the Fosse Way Roman road, and the company became the Warwick and Napton Canal company. Bascote Locks are on this revised route, and would not have been built had the original route been followed.

The Grand Junction Canal were building their route from London to Braunston as a broad canal, and tried to persuade the Warwick and Napton Canal to do the same, but they were convinced that most traffic would come from the Birmingham system and the Dudley Canal, and built the locks suitable for 7-foot (2.1 m) boats. The canal opened on 19 March 1800, and the Grand Junction opened to Braunston later that year. The four Bascote locks are numbers 14 to 17 out of a total of 23 locks which descend from Napton, the final one of which is called Radford Bottom Lock, and is close to where the route as built left the planned route to Braunston. Two more locks raised the level again just before the junction with the Warwick and Birmingham Canal.

The Warwick and Napton Canal and the Birmingham and Warwick Canal both faced stiff competition from the railways, and declared themselves bankrupt in the early 1850s. The companies were reconstituted by the receiver, and continued to trade. From 1917, they were managed jointly, and on 1 January 1929, were sold to the Regent's Canal, and with the Grand Junction Canal, became part of the Grand Union Canal. In order to effectively compete, the new company wanted to upgrade the canals so that wide barges could be used between London and Birmingham. Their aim was to accommodate barges 12.5 feet (3.8 m) wide immediately, and ultimately to make the route suitable for 14-foot (4.3 m) barges. 52 locks on the two Warwick canals were converted into weirs, and 51 new locks, each 83.5 by 15 feet (25.5 by 4.6 m) were built. There was one less because the flight of six at Knowle was replaced by five. In order to give a depth of 5.5 feet (1.7 m), the height of weirs was raised or lock sills were lowered. As part of the work, the top two locks at Bascote were made into a staircase pair. Although the Duke of Kent performed an opening ceremony on 30 October 1934 at the top lock of the Hatton flight, to mark the completion of the project, work continued until 1937. One 12.5 feet (3.8 m) boat was built, but without widening the bottom of the canal, there were many places where two such boats could not pass, and the new locks were used by pairs of narrow boats.

== Location ==
In common with many of the locks on this section of the canal, the remains of the original locks can still be seen beside the newer ones. The four locks raise the level of the canal by 26.75 feet (8.15 m). Below the bottom lock, the canal is level for 0.4 miles (0.64 km) to Welsh Road Lock, and above the top lock, it is level for 1.6 miles (2.6 km) to Itchington Bottom Lock. The paddles on the locks reflect the style of the Warwick and Napton Canal, and are different from those further south, where the canal was built by the Grand Junction company.

== Bibliography ==
- Cumberlidge, Jane (2009). Inland Waterways of Great Britain (8th Ed.). Imray Laurie Norie and Wilson. ISBN 978-1-84623-010-3.
- Hadfield, Charles (1970). The Canals of the East Midlands. David and Charles. ISBN 0-7153-4871-X.
- Nicholson (2006). Nicholson Guides Vol 1: Grand Union, Oxford and the South East. Harper Collins. ISBN 978-0-00-721109-8.
