= Aylesbury Canal Society =

Waterway society in Buckinghamshire, England

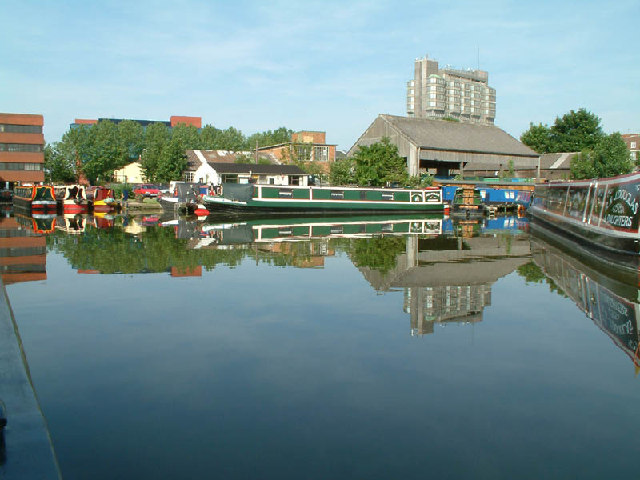
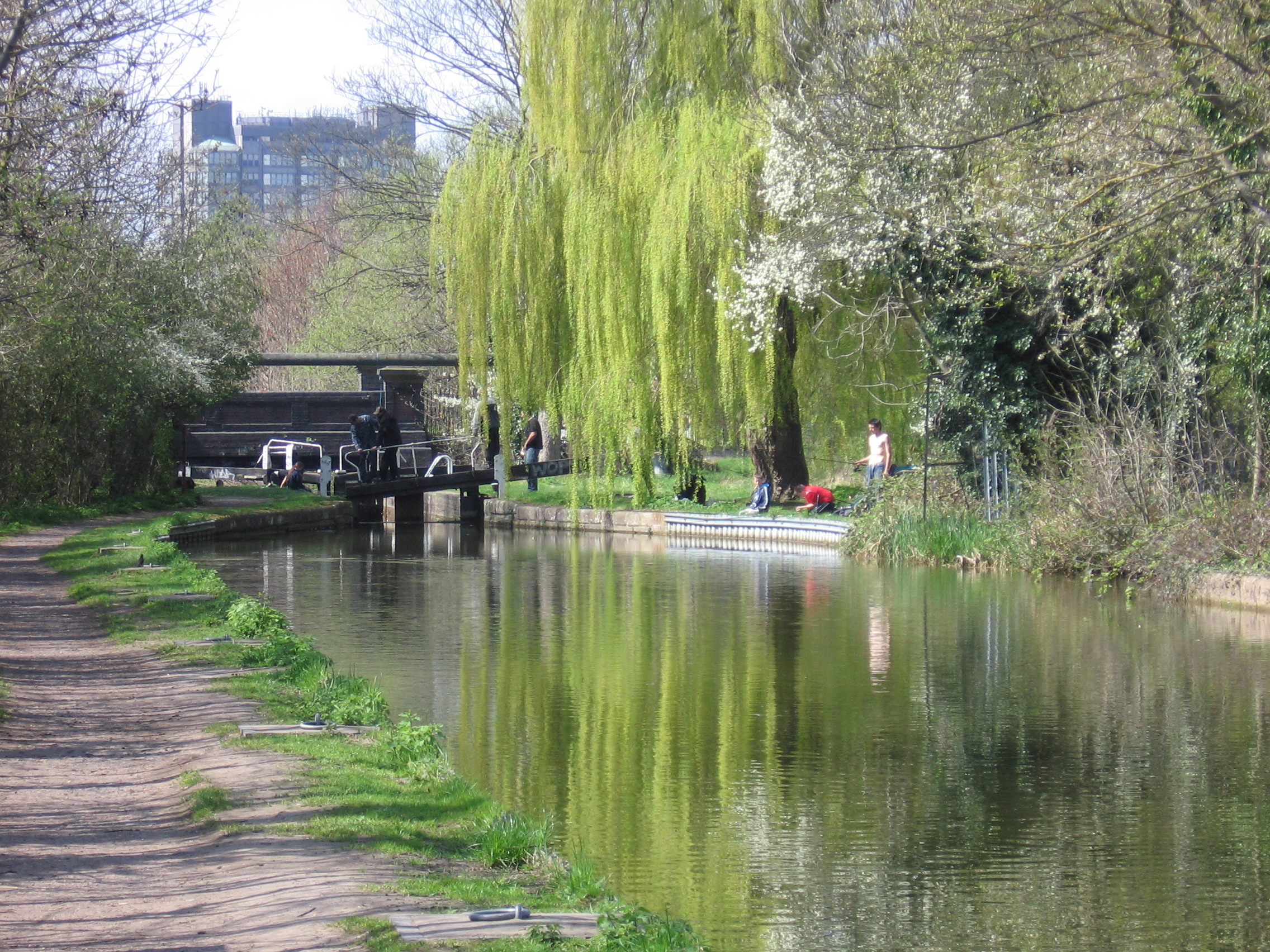
The Grand Union Canal, Aylesbury Basin, England

The Aylesbury Canal Society is a waterway society on the Grand Union Canal, Buckinghamshire, England. The society was launched in 1971 to promote the use of the Aylesbury Arm, and to run moorings leased from British Waterways.

Aylesbury Basin was sold by British Waterways to Aylesbury Vale District Council in 2007. However, Aylesbury Canal Society held the lease until 2018.

In August 2013 Aylesbury Canal Society moved to a purpose built basin, Circus Field Basin HP20 1AP. The new site has a Dry and Wet dock for boat blacking, painting and maintenance along with a meeting/function room with bar and dance floor..

== Aylesbury Arm Canal ==
Construction of the 6.25-mile (10.06 km) Aylesbury canal from Marsworth on the Grand Junction (now Grand Union) Canal into Aylesbury started in 1811. It opened in 1814 and was used for the transport of agricultural produce and coal. Its profitability was undermined by the development of the railways from the 1840s.

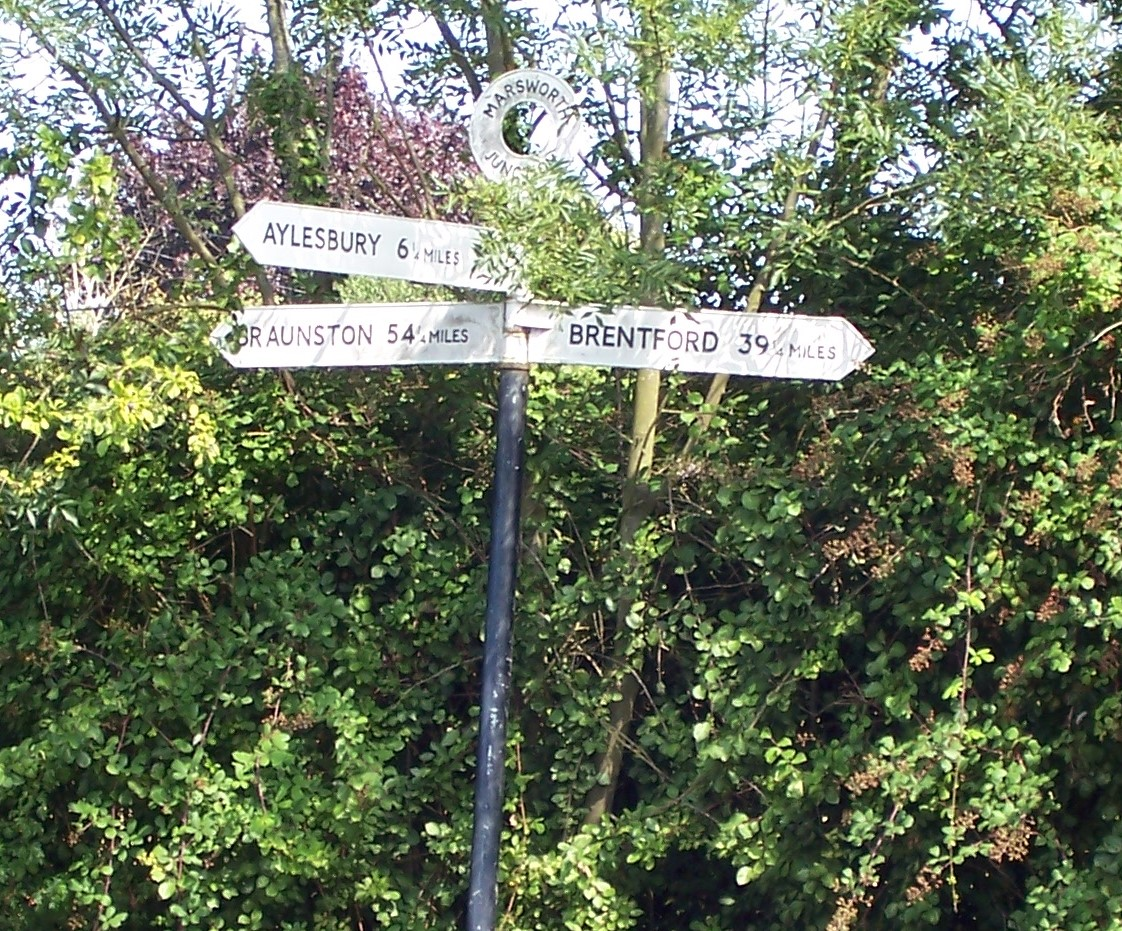
Finger post Marsworth Junction Grand Union Canal

It is a narrow beam canal, the maximum length of boats is 72 feet (22 metres) and the width of the locks is 7 feet (2.1 metres). The canal falls a total of 94 feet 8 inches (28.85 metres) between Marsworth Junction and Aylesbury via 16 locks:

- Marsworth No.1 & 2 Locks (staircase)
- Marsworth No.3 Lock
- Marsworth No.4 Black Jacks Lock
- Lock Nos.5, 6 & 7
- No.8 Jefferies Lock
- No.9 Wilstone (Gudgeon Stream)
- No.10 Puttenham Top Lock
- No.11 Puttenham Bottom Lock
- No.12 Buckland Lock
- No.13 Red House Lock
- No.14 Broughton Lock
- No.15 Osier Bed Lock (Aylesbury Lock)
- No.16 Hills and Partridges Lock (Aylesbury Lock).

There are 19 numbered over-bridges on the canal carrying roads, footpaths and farm accommodation bridges. Two bridges are named: No.2 Dixon's Gap Bridge, and No.3 Wilstone Bridge. There are three pipe bridges: one between Lock No.6 and Bridge No.2, one between Bridges Nos.15 and 16, and one between Lock No.16 and Bridge No.17.

== See also ==
- List of waterway societies in the United Kingdom
