= Saltisford Canal Arm =

Arm of the Grand Union Canal in Warwickshire, England

Coordinates: 52.2877°N 1.6012°W

The Saltisford Canal Arm is a short stretch of canal located in the town of Warwick, Warwickshire, England. The Warwick and Birmingham Canal Act 1793 (33 Geo. 3. c. 38) allowed construction of the new canal, which was completed and officially opened on 19 December 1799, with trading starting 19 March 1800. Originally it was not an arm at all, but the terminus of the Warwick and Birmingham Canal. It took on the appearance of a branch (or "arm") when the Warwick and Napton Canal joined the Warwick and Birmingham Canal at Budbrooke junction, 1/3 mile (0.54 km) from the terminus, when both canals were completed in 1799. It is one of a few surviving arms of the much longer Grand Union Canal.

Its initial purpose was purely to allow goods to be transported near to Warwick town centre with its castle and market and an consequently an industrial area grew up around the terminus basins and its 20 wharves. With this, industries came to Saltisford to make use of the facilities available. Among these were extensive timber yards for the boat building industry of Joseph Monks and Thomas Sanders. There were also yards for slate, and lime from Derbyshire for the brick and tile works at Emscote. The building of the gas works next to the end of the arm in 1822 also greatly increased its usage. However, in 1845 the Great Western Railway built a line passing through Leamington Spa and Warwick, with a narrow gauge line connecting the railway with the gasworks, taking away a major use of the canal, and the start of the gradual decline in the arm.

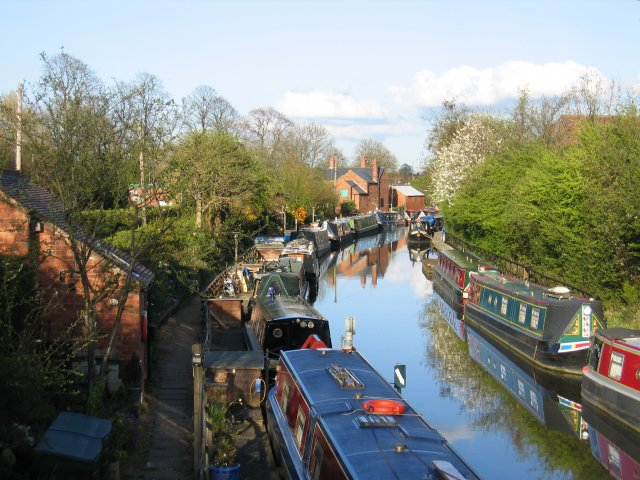
The restored arm

It stayed under the control of the Warwick and Birmingham Canal until 1927, when it was purchased by the Regent's Canal company which, two years later, was renamed the Grand Union.

In the 1930s, the site was used extensively as a workyard and storage area during the reconstruction of the nearby Hatton Locks. The Transport Act 1947 saw the canal network as a whole nationalised and British Waterways was formed after the Transport Act 1962 which split control of the canals and railways between two different authorities. At this time, the arm, after leaving the main canal, passed under the Chiltern Main Line railway bridge and terminated at the back of what is now The Antelope Pub next to Sainsbury's, making it around 750 metres (2,460 ft).

It was during the early 1980s that part of the arm was taken out of use and filled in, being built over with houses and offices. This led to the canal terminating just before the Chiltern Main Line, cutting its length to approximately 440 metres (1,440 ft). The Saltisford Canal Trust was formed in 1982 and spent the next three years restoring the remainder of the route. Further work was done in 2007, helped by a £2,000 grant from the Inland Waterways Association. The arm now has several residential boats, as well as a few long-term non-residential leisure moorings, and offers short term moorings for visiting boats.
