= Shrewley =

Village and civil parish in Warwickshire, England

Coordinates: 52.305°N 1.685°W

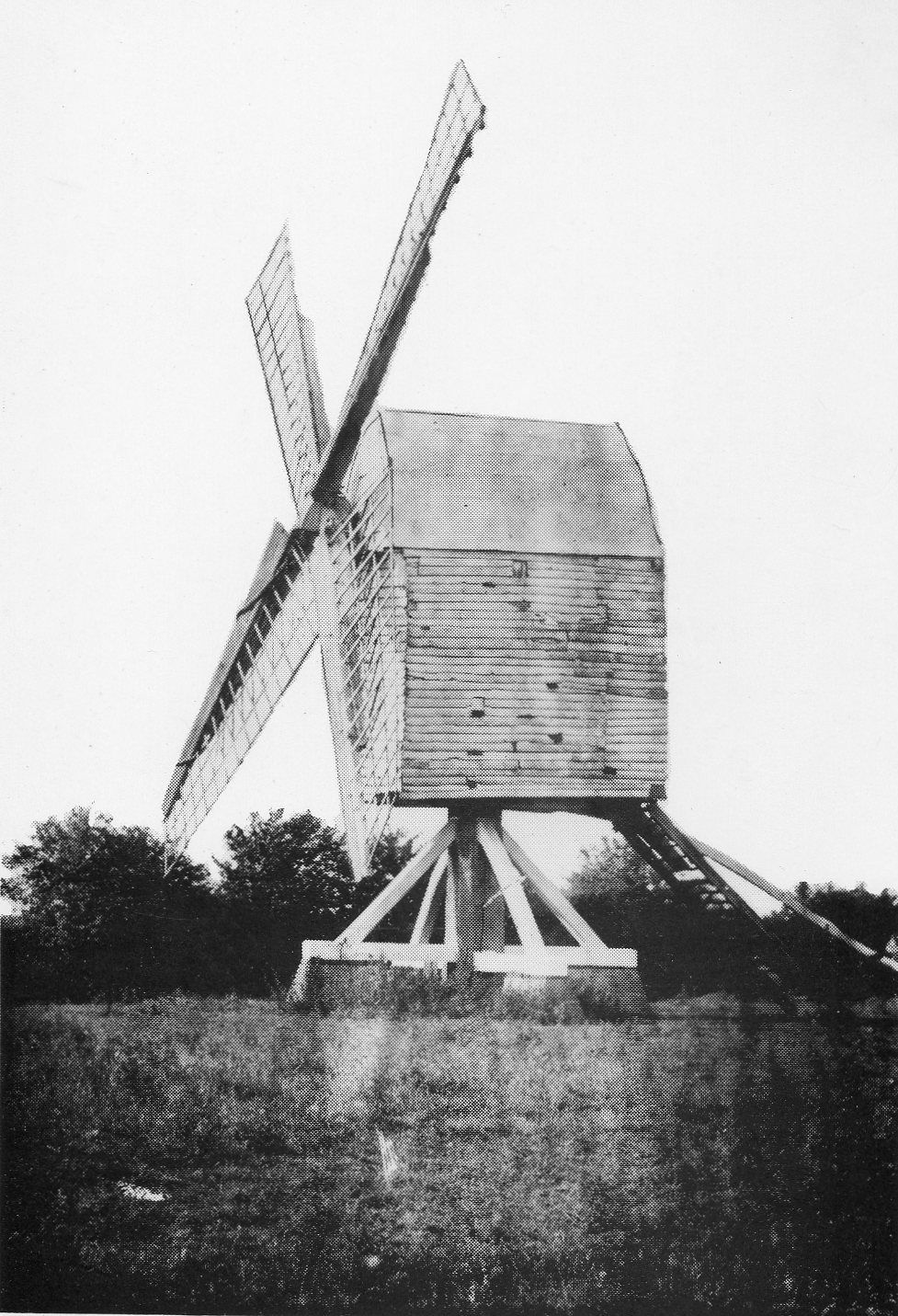
Shrewley image

Shrewley is a village and civil parish in Warwickshire, England, about 4 miles (6 km) north-west of Warwick. It consists of Little Shrewley, and Shrewley Common, Hatton Station, Station Road and Five Ways. It has the Grand Union Canal, which passes through Shrewley Tunnel and cutting which is a SSSI, with the Chiltern Main Line railway and M40 motorway all running parallel and in close proximity at the south-western end of Shrewley Common. The parish has two pubs, The Durham Ox, in Shrewley Common, once well known for its Marrow Sunday post-harvest celebration, steam fair and produce competition and auction, and The Case is Altered at Five Ways. Shrewley has no church, but until the 1990s had an independent chapel with a regular congregation, the site of which has now been converted into a dwelling.

== Transport ==
Hatton station is within the parish, not in the neighbouring parish of Hatton. A triangle of railway lines is located west of the station, used by trains to and from Stratford upon Avon.
