= Hatton Locks =

Series of locks in Warwickshire, West Midlands, England

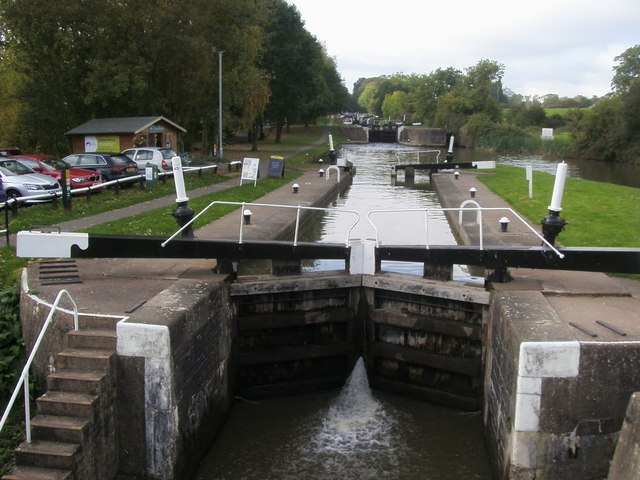
- Lock 43, the fourth from the top of the flight
- Interactive map of Hatton Locks
- 52.299°N 1.644°W
- Waterway: Grand Union Canal
- Maintained by: Canal & River Trust
- Operation: Manual
- First built: 1800
- Latest built: 1932–34
- Length: 83.5 feet (25.5 m)
- Width: 15 feet (4.6 m)
- Fall: 146.5 feet (44.7 m)
- Flight of 21 locks

The Hatton Locks or Hatton Flight are a flight of 21 locks on the Grand Union Canal in Hatton, Warwickshire, England. The flight spans less than 2 miles (3.2 km) of canal, and has a total rise of 146.5 feet (44.7 m).

The locks were built as narrow locks on the Warwick and Birmingham Canal, which officially opened in December 1799, although it was not used until March 1800. Use of the flight increased until 1838, when competition from railways began. By 1929 they were in poor condition, but the canal became part of the much larger Grand Union Canal from that year. Between 1932 and 1934 new locks were built alongside the old ones, which were 15 feet (4.6 m) wide, enabling two narrow boats to use them at the same time. The new locks were opened by Prince George, Duke of Kent in October 1934.

Four bridges cross the canal between the locks in the flight, with another two between the bottom lock and the Saltisford Arm. There are lock cottages at the top and bottom locks, with the upper one being grade II listed. The towpath is on the north bank of the canal from the bottom lock up to a roving bridge just before lock 43, where it crosses to the south bank.

== History ==
Construction of the Warwick and Birmingham Canal was authorised by the Warwick and Birmingham Canal Act 1793 (33 Geo. 3. c. 38) which received royal approval on 6 March 1793. The canal was to run from a junction with the Birmingham Canal Navigations at Digbeth Junction to Warwick where it ended at Saltisford Wharf. The Warwick and Napton Canal was authorised in the following year, and would provide an onward connection to the Oxford Canal at Napton, from which boats would be able to reach London via Braunston Junction and the Grand Junction Canal, also authorised in 1793. Whereas the Grand Junction Canal was built as a wide canal, with locks capable of taking boats up to 14 feet (4.3 m) wide, or two narrowboats side by side, the Warwick Canal locks were built to accommodate a single narrowboat, although plans for the tunnel at Shrewley were altered, and it was built 16 feet (4.9 m) wide, while the bridge holes were made 21 feet (6.4 m) wide.

The Hatton flight of 21 locks was at the southern end of the canal, descending to the Saltisford Arm and Budbrooke Junction, where the Warwick and Napton Canal turned off. The flight was officially opened, along with the rest of the canal and the Warwick and Napton Canal on 19 December 1799, but work was obviously not quite finished, as no trading took place until 19 March 1800. Tolls for using the canal were set at two pence per mile, with a minimum charge of one shilling. The rate reduced to one-and-a-half pence for distances over 16 miles (26 km). However, there was an additional charge of two shillings and nine pence for using the top lock of the Hatton Flight, an indication that the company was expecting there to be water supply problems. While figures for the amount of traffic using the locks have not been published, some indication can be gained from the level of dividends paid to shareholders, which rose from 1.3 percent in 1803-05 to 18 percent for 1838-39, showing significant jumps which can be tied in to the opening of the whole of the Grand Junction Canal in 1805, and to the improvements to the Birmingham Canal Navigations Main Line made between 1829 and 1838.

After 1838, competition from the railways resulted in income dropping dramatically, and no dividends were paid after 1853. The canal and the Hatton flight might have been demolished in 1845, for the London & Birmingham Extension & Northampton, Daventry, Leamington & Warwick Railway attempted to buy the canal to convert it into a railway. The action fell through, although the canal company got to keep a generous deposit paid by the railway company. Financially, the canal was struggling, and a receiver was appointed. The company was reconstructed, and the payment of small dividends was resumed in 1859. In 1895, the two Warwick Canals agreed to amalgamate with the Grand Junction Canal, but the bill to authorise the action was withdrawn. From 1917, the Warwick Canals were managed by a joint committee, until they became part of the newly-formed Grand Union Canal in 1929.

The Regents Canal and the Grand Junction Canal had started negotiating in 1925, with the intention of creating a canal company that was big enough to compete with other forms of transport. The details were worked out in 1928, and the Regent's Canal and Dock Company (Grand Junction Canal Purchase) Act 1928 (18 & 19 Geo. 5. c. xcvii) authorised the amalgamation of the Regents Canal and the Grand Junction. A separate act, the Regent's Canal and Dock Company (Warwick Canals Purchase) Act 1928 (18 & 19 Geo. 5. c. xcviii) authorised the acquisition of the Warwick Canals, and the new company began operating from 1 January 1929. Straight away, they issued a development plan, which would see the Warwick Canals, including the Hatton Locks, widened. They obtained a loan on favourable terms from the government, and work began to make the canal wider and deeper.

The locks at Hatton, together with another 31 north of Calcutt, were converted into weirs and new locks were built alongside them. The locks were 15 feet (4.6 m) wide by 83.5 feet (25.5 m) long, enabling them to be used by two narrowboats side by side, or by wide beam barges in the future, although the regular use of wide barges never occurred. Work on the Hatton Locks started in 1932, and was completed in two years, using a workforce of over 1,000 men. The locks and bridges were constructed of concrete, which was a departure from normal practice. They were officially opened by Prince George, Duke of Kent on 30 October 1934, with a ceremony taking place at the top lock of the flight. The Duke was then transported part-way down the flight to the bridge in a boat named Progress, a prototype 12.5-foot (3.8 m) wide timber barge. From the bridge he went to Warwick for a formal lunch.

The flight was known as the "stairway to heaven" due to the physical effort required to use the locks and the subsequent easier journey to Camp Hill where the workmen would receive their wages from the Grand Union offices.

== Route ==
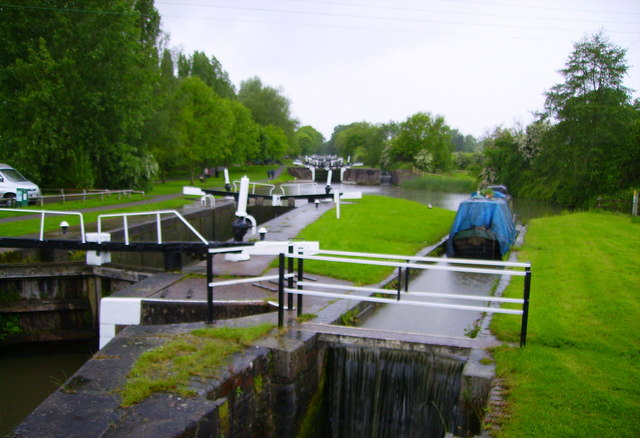
Lock 43 with the 1929 wide lock on the left and the remains of the original narrow lock on the right.

The Birmingham and Warwick Canal began at the Saltisford Arm, to the west of Warwick. The arm is crossed by a bridge carrying Budbrooke Road, which is followed immediately by Budbrooke Junction, where the former Warwick and Napton Canal turned off. This is now part of the Grand Union Canal to Napton Junction on the Oxford Canal. The next crossing is the A46 road bridge, which is part of the Warwick Bypass at this point. Hatton Bottom Lock, number 26, is just to the west of the bridge, with a lock cottage on the north side. Old Budbrooke Road then crosses, and the ascent continues through locks 27 to 31, which are more spaced out than those at the top of the flight. The towpath is on the north side of the canal.

Ugly Bridge carries a minor road that connects the A4177 to Budbrooke. Four more locks, numbered 32 to 35, bring the canal to a bridge carrying Middle Lock Lane. There is a grade II listed lockkeepers cottage at lock 34, which was built of brick and plain tile for the opening of the canal. It has two storeys, and has barely been altered since its construction. Middle Lock Lane is just before Hatton Middle Lock, numbered 36. Six locks raise the canal to Canal Road bridge, which is where Prince George left the canal after officially opening the new wider locks in 1929. The towpath crosses over the canal to the south bank at the bridge. Above the bridge are three more locks numbered 43 to 45, before Hatton Top Lock, number 46, is reached. There is a dry dock and boatyard by lock 43. Because they are so close together, the locks above lock 36 have side ponds, to increase the volume of water available for locking down the flight. The 21 locks have raised the level of the canal by 146.5 feet (44.7 m). There is another lock cottage by lock 46, which dates from the construction of the canal. It is built of red brick, has two storeys with a single-storey wing, and is grade II listed. Remains of the old narrow locks can still be seen beside many of the new concrete locks.

The locks in the Hatton flight are quite distinctive, as they have candlestick paddle gear, which were manufactured in the 1930s by Ham Baker of Westminster, and are set at an angle to the balance beams of the locks. When closing the paddles, boaters must not just let them drop.Paddles must be manually wound down into the closed position. On the south bank of the canal near lock 42, the Canal and River Trust have some offices, which are based in a superb depot built in 1899 by the Warwick and Birmingham Canal. Once used to make lock gates, the depot now includes a heritage skills centre. There is a small cafe located by Hatton Top Lock.

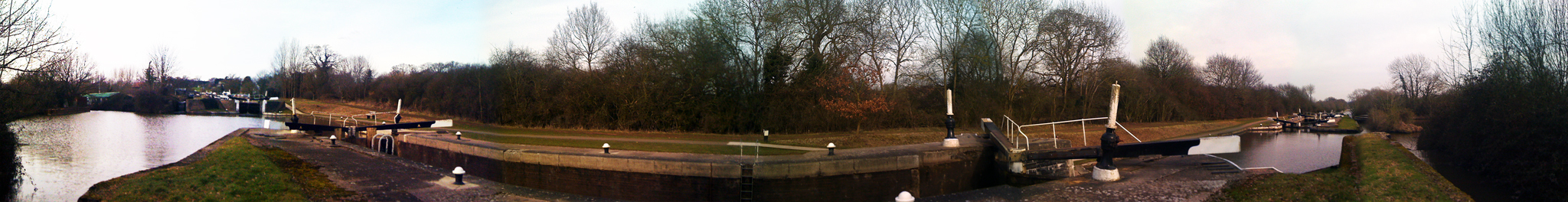
A panorama of Hatton Locks on 3 March 2010

== Bibliography ==
- Elliot, Steve (October 2024). "WW Guide to the Warwickshire Ring". Waterways World. ISSN 0309-1422.
- Hadfield, Charles (1970). The Canals of the East Midlands. David and Charles. ISBN 978-0-7153-4871-0.
- Nicholson (2006). Nicholson Guides Vol 1: Grand Union, Oxford & the South East. Harper Collins. ISBN 978-0-00-721109-8.
