= Grand Union Canal =

Canal in England

Coordinates: 52.05076°N 0.73400°W

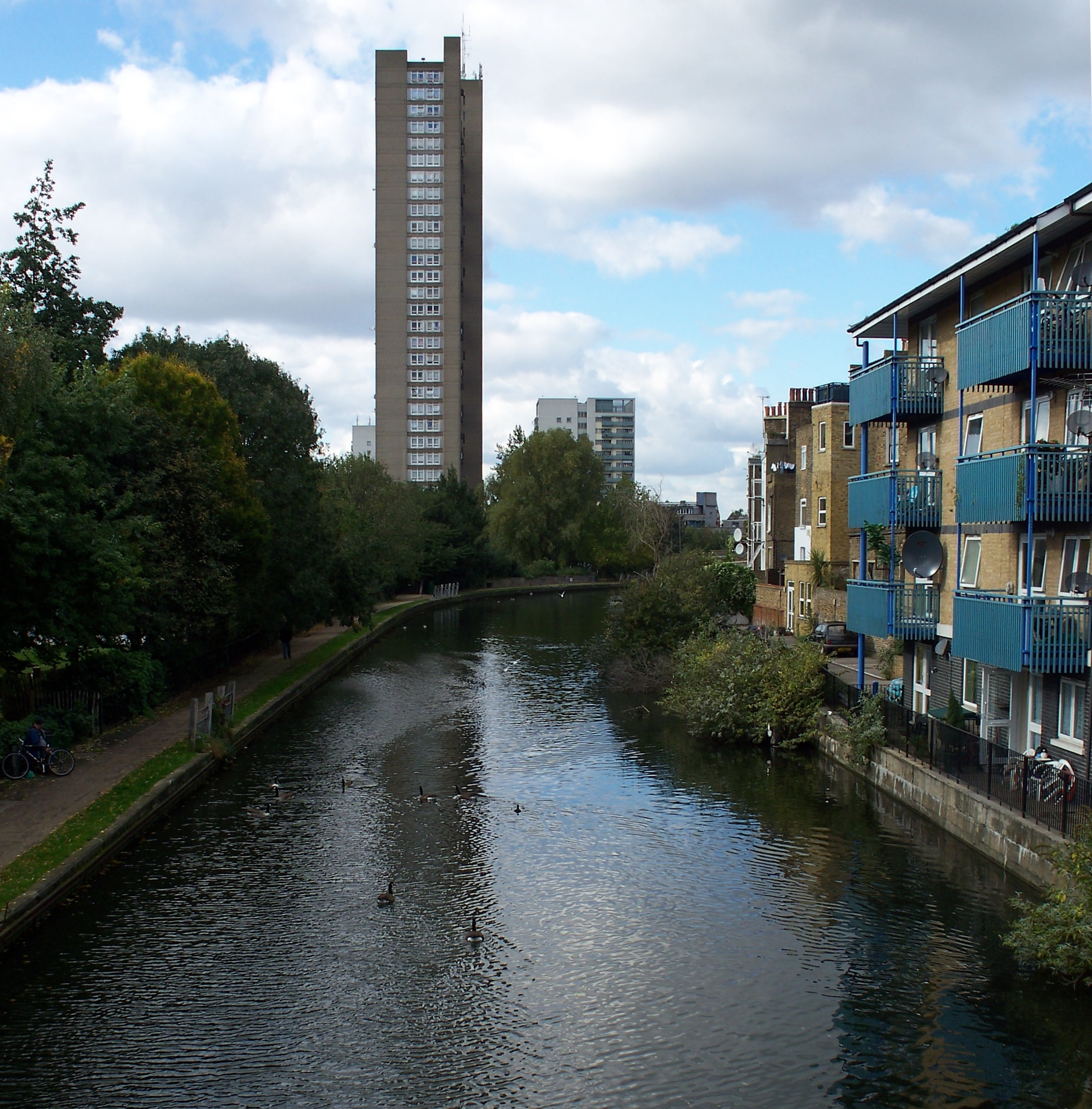
- The Grand Union Canal passing Trellick Tower at Westbourne Park, London
- Interactive map of Grand Union Canal

Specifications
- Length: 137 miles (220 km)
- Locks: 166
- Status: Navigable

History
- Date of act: 1931

Geography
- Connects to: River Thames; Regent's Canal; River Nene; River Soar; Oxford Canal; Stratford-upon-Avon Canal; Digbeth Branch Canal; Birmingham and Fazeley Canal

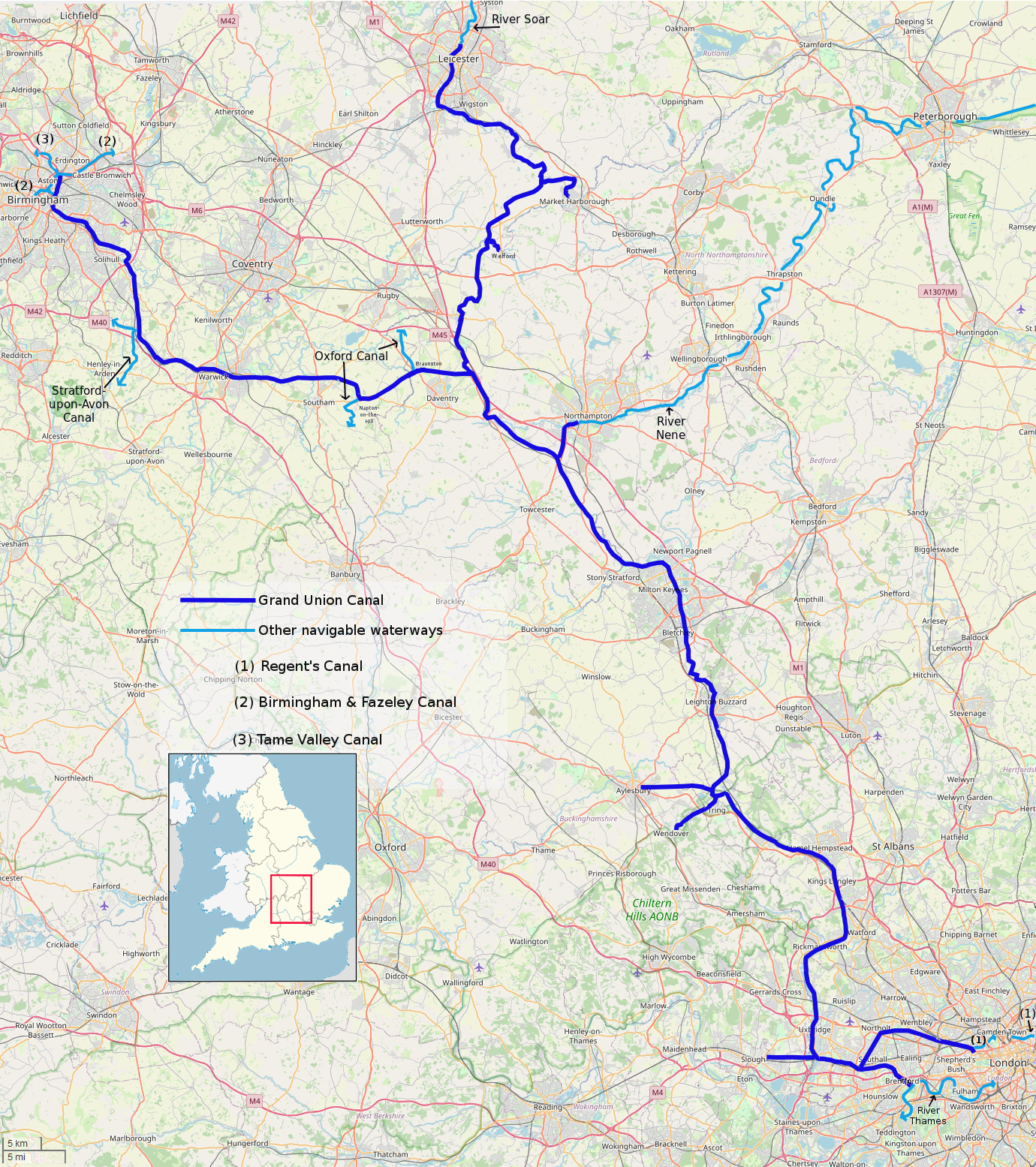
Geographic map of the entire Grand Union canal system (zoom in to see detail)

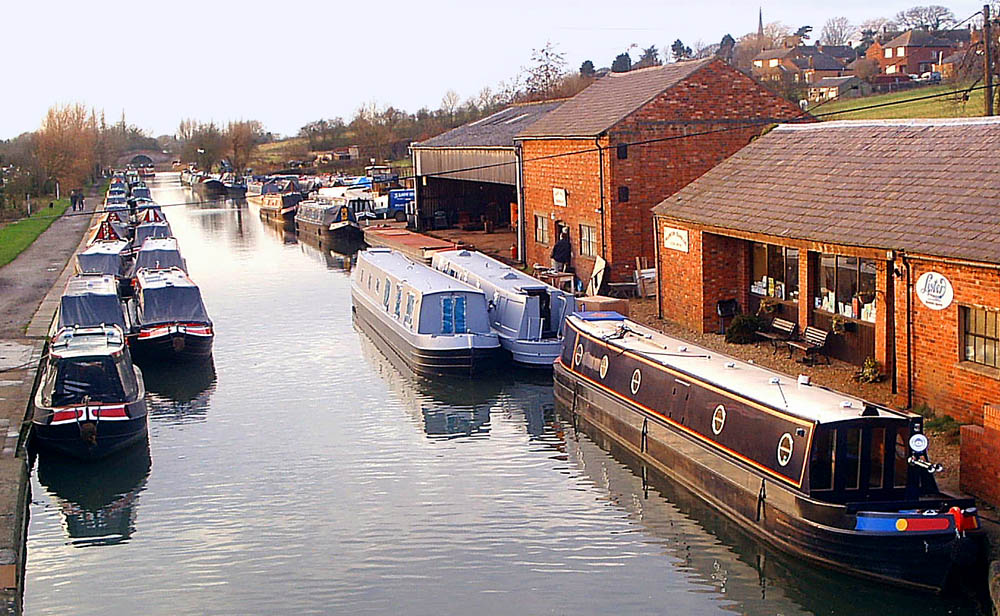
The canal at Braunston

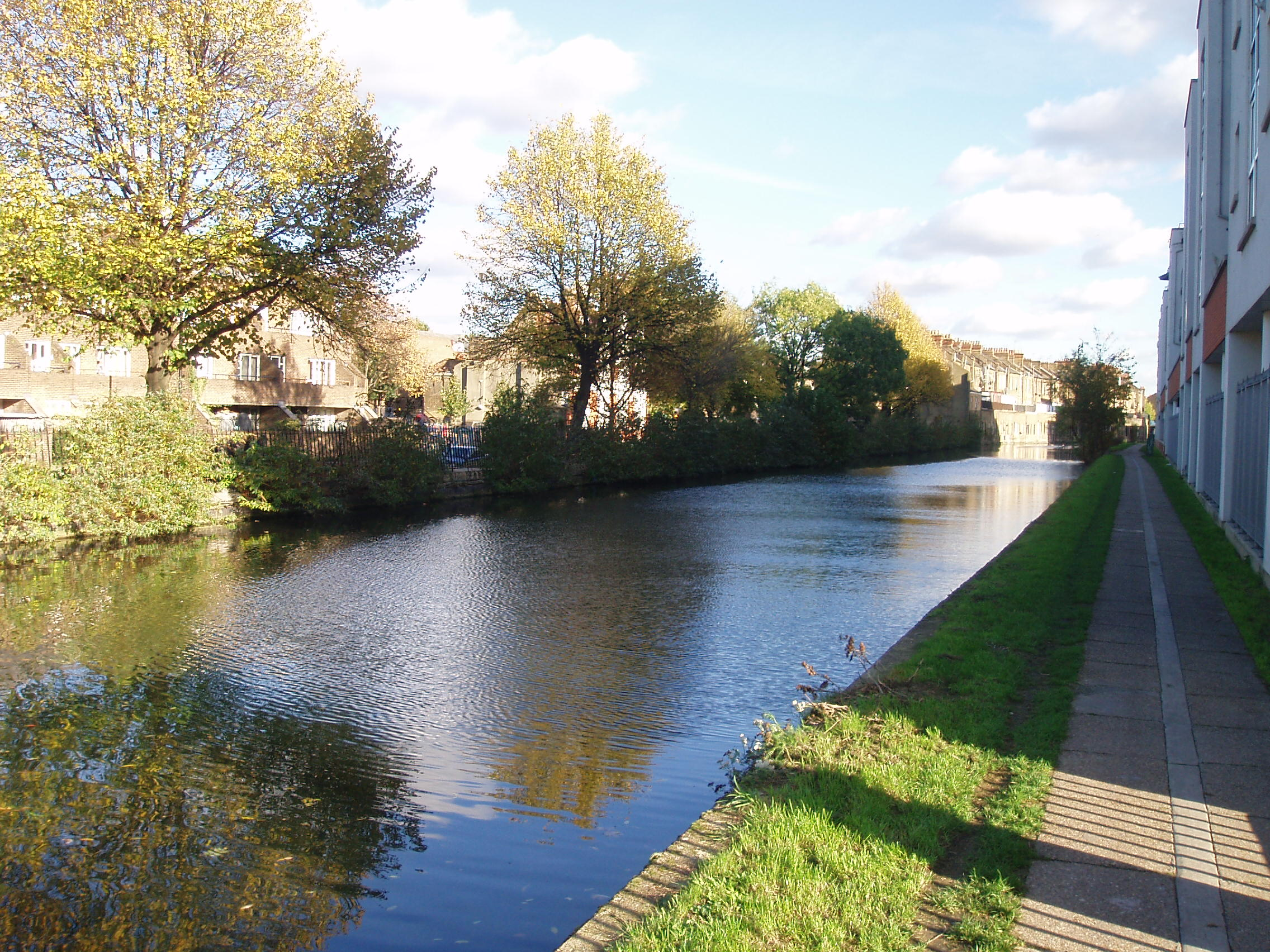
The Grand Union Canal near Westbourne Park, London

The Grand Union Canal in England is part of the British canal system. It is the principal navigable waterway between London and the Midlands. Starting in London, one arm runs to Leicester and another to Birmingham. The Birmingham canal is 137 miles (220 km) with 166 locks. The Birmingham line has a number of short branches to places including Slough, Aylesbury, Wendover, and Northampton. The Leicester line has two short arms of its own, to Market Harborough and Welford.

It has links with other canals and navigable waterways, including the River Thames, the Regent's Canal, the River Nene and River Soar, the Oxford Canal, the Stratford-upon-Avon Canal, the Digbeth Branch Canal and the Birmingham and Fazeley Canal.

The canal south of Braunston to the River Thames at Brentford in London is the original Grand Junction Canal. At Braunston the latter met the Oxford Canal linking back to the Thames to the south and to Coventry to the north via the Coventry Canal. "Grand Union Canal" is also the original name for what is now the Leicester line of the modern Grand Union, running from short east of Braunston to Leicester, and which is now sometimes referred to as the Old Grand Union Canal to avoid ambiguity.

== History ==
Regent's Canal and Dock Company (Grand Junction Canal Purchase) Act 1928 (Note: Section 1.)
- Act of Parliament
- Parliament of the United Kingdom
- Long title: An Act to provide for the transfer to the Regent's Canal and Dock Company of the canal undertaking of the Company of Proprietors of the Grand Junction Canal to confer various powers upon the Regent's Canal and Dock Company and for other purposes.
- Citation: 18 & 19 Geo. 5. c. xcviii
- Territorial extent: United Kingdom

Dates
- Royal assent: 3 August 1928
- Commencement: 3 August 1928 (Note: The Acts of Parliament (Commencement) Act 1793.)

Other legislation
- Amended by: Grand Union Canal Act 1931; Grand Union Canal Act 1943; National Insurance (Modification of Transport Undertaking Superannuation Funds) Regulations 1961

Status: Amended

Text of statute as originally enacted

The Grand Union Canal in its current form came into being on 1 January 1929. The Regent's Canal and the Grand Junction Canal agreed that amalgamation and modernisation were the only way to remain competitive against rail and newly developing road transport, and the merger was authorised by the Regent's Canal and Dock Company (Grand Junction Canal Purchase) Act 1928 (18 & 19 Geo. 5. c. xcviii).

- Regent's Canal
- Hertford Union Canal – bought by the Regent's Canal in 1857

Main Line

- Warwick and Napton Canal – bought by the Regent's Canal in 1928
- Warwick and Birmingham Canal – bought by the Regent's Canal in 1928
- Birmingham and Warwick Junction Canal – bought by the Regent's Canal in 1928
- Grand Junction Canal – bought by the Regent's Canal in 1928

Leicester Line

- Old Grand Union Canal – bought by the Grand Junction in 1894
- Leicestershire and Northamptonshire Union Canal – bought by the Grand Junction in 1894
- Leicester Navigation – bought by the Grand Union in 1932
- Loughborough Navigation – bought by the Grand Union in 1932
- Erewash Canal – bought by the Grand Union in 1932

A five-mile (eight-km) section of the Oxford Canal forms the main line of the Grand Union between Braunston and Napton-on-the-Hill. Although the Grand Union intended to buy the Oxford Canal and Coventry Canal, these purchases did not take place.

The section of the main line between Brentford and Braunston (formerly the Grand Junction Canal) was built as a 'wide' or 'broad' canal – that is, its locks were wide enough to accommodate two narrowboats abreast (side by side) or a single wide barge up to 14 feet (4.3 m) in beam.

Grand Union Canal Act 1931
- Act of Parliament
- Parliament of the United Kingdom
- Long title: An Act to empower the Grand Union Canal Company to execute works and improve part of their canal to confer powers upon that company with reference to part of the Oxford Canal Navigation and for other purposes.
- Citation: 21 & 22 Geo. 5. c. xc
- Territorial extent: United Kingdom

Dates
- Royal assent: 31 July 1931
- Commencement: 31 July 1931

Other legislation
- Amends: Regent's Canal and Dock Company (Grand Junction Canal Purchase) Act 1928
- Amended by: Grand Union Canal Act 1943

Status: Amended

Text of statute as originally enacted

The onward sections from Braunston to Birmingham had been built as 'narrow' canals, that is, the locks could accommodate only a single narrowboat. The Grand Union Canal Act 1931 (21 & 22 Geo. 5. c. xc) was passed authorising a key part of the modernisation scheme of the Grand Union, supported by government grants. The narrow locks (and several bridges) between Napton and Camp Hill Top Lock in Birmingham were rebuilt to take widebeam boats or barges up to 12 feet 6 inches (3.81 m) in beam, or two narrowboats. The canal was dredged and bank improvements carried out: the depth was increased to 5 feet 6 inches (1.68 m) to allow heavier cargoes, and the minimum width increased to 26 feet (7.9 m) to enable two boats of 12 feet 6 inches to pass. Lock works were completed in 1934 when the Duke of Kent opened the new broad locks at Hatton, and other improvements finished by 1937.

These improvements to depth and width were never carried out between Braunston and London. Camp Hill Locks in Birmingham were not widened, as it would have been very expensive and of little point, since they lead only to further flights of locks not in the ownership of the Grand Union. A new basin and warehouse were constructed at Tyseley, above Camp Hill, to deal with this. Although the Grand Union company had a number of broad boats built to take advantage of the improvements, they never really caught on and the canal continued to be operated largely by pairs of narrowboats, whose journeys were facilitated by the newly widened locks in which they could breast up.

Grand Union Canal (Leicester Canals Purchase, &c.) Act 1931
- Act of Parliament
- Parliament of the United Kingdom
- Long title: An Act to provide for the transfer to the Grand Union Canal Company of the undertakings of the Company of Proprietors of the Leicester Navigation the Company of Proprietors of the Navigation from the River Trent to the Town of Loughborough and the Company of Proprietors of the Erewash Canal in the counties of Derby and Nottingham to authorise the Grand Union Canal Company to execute works and for other purposes.
- Citation: 21 & 22 Geo. 5. c. cvii
- Territorial extent: United Kingdom

Dates
- Royal assent: 31 July 1931
- Commencement: 31 July 1931

Other legislation
- Amended by: Grand Union Canal Act 1943

Status: Amended

Text of statute as originally enacted

The three sections between Norton junction and the River Trent (collectively known as the 'Leicester line') are mixed in size. From Norton to Foxton, the route is a narrow canal. From below Foxton to Leicester it is a wide canal. From Leicester to the Trent, the route is effectively the River Soar and the locks and bridges are wide. The Grand Union Canal (Leicester Canals Purchase, &c.) Act 1931 (21 & 22 Geo. 5. c. cvii) authorised the widening of the locks at Watford Locks and Foxton Locks, but with government grants for this section not forthcoming, the work was not carried out.

The Grand Union Canal was nationalised in 1948, control transferring to the British Transport Commission, and in 1962 to the British Waterways Board, later British Waterways. Commercial traffic continued to decline, effectively ceasing in the 1970s, though lime juice was carried from Brentford to Boxmoor until 1981, and aggregates on the River Soar until 1995. However, leisure traffic took over, and the canal is now as busy as it ever was, with leisure boating complemented by fishing, towpath walking and gongoozling. More recently freight traffic returned with the carriage of aggregates from Denham to West Drayton in barges and narrowboats, and the opening of a new wharf for re-cyclables and aggregates at Old Oak Common.

== Brentford to Braunston ==
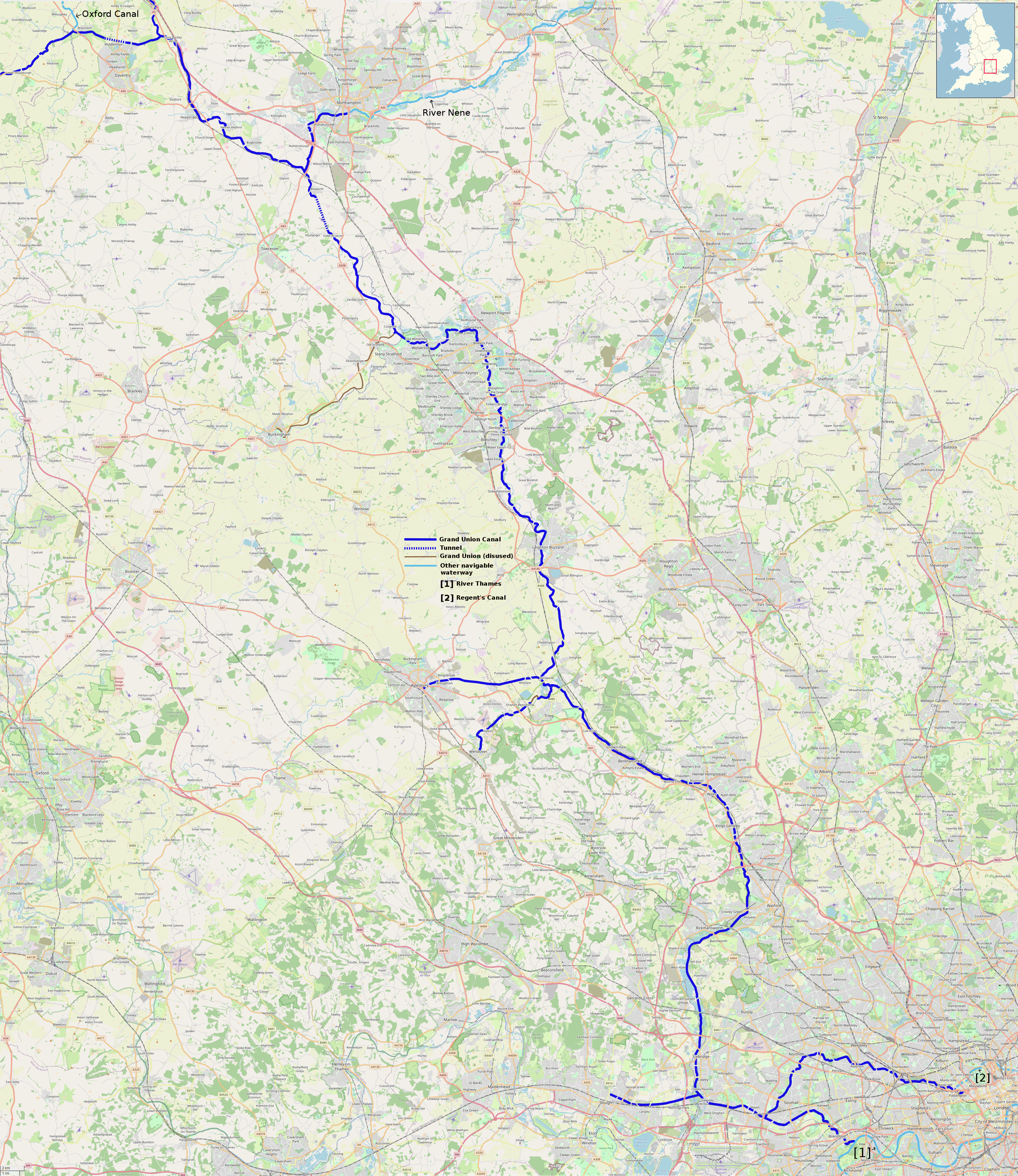
Geographic map of the London to Braunston section of the canal (zoom in to see detail)

One end of the Grand Union Canal (Grand Junction Canal – Main Line) is at Brentford on the River Thames in west London, where the canal follows the engineered course of the Brent. The double Thames Lock at Brentford separates the Tideway administered by the Port of London Authority from the River Brent/Grand Union Canal, administered by the Canal & River Trust. The locks on the canal are partially numbered: numbered consecutively south of its turn-off for Leicester, Braunston Junction. Thames Lock is lock number 101.

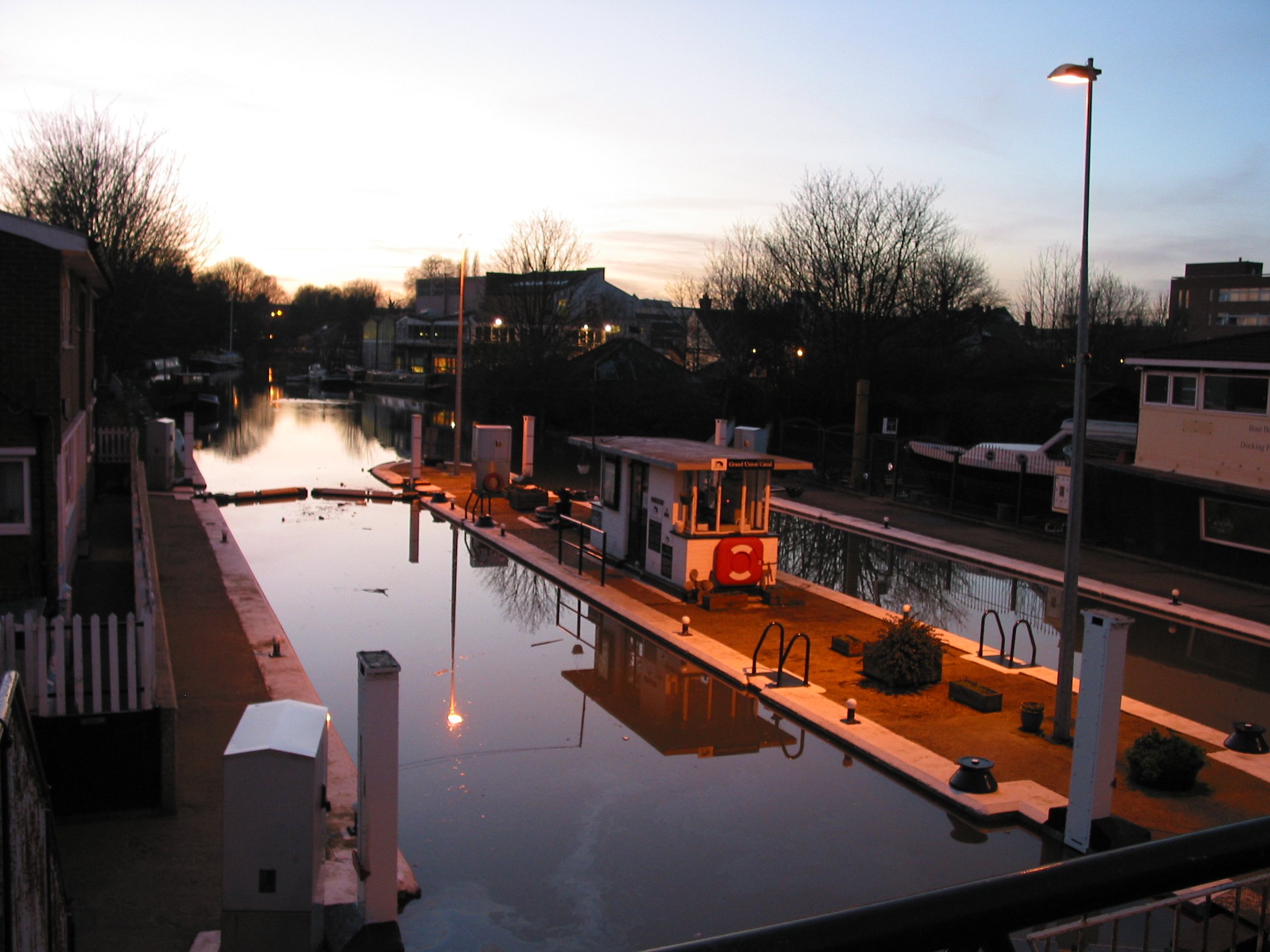
The Thames Lock on the Grand Union Canal, Brentford, West London. Photo taken in twilight at the peak of a spring tide

For more than 3 miles (4.8 km) upstream of Thames Lock, the canal and the Brent are one and the same, and the waterway is semi-tidal until the double Gauging Lock (lock 100) at Brentford. Just upstream of the Gauging Lock was a large canal basin, now known as Brentford Lock, from which the canal covers more distance passing under Cornelius Bridge, Brentford Railway Bridge, and the Great West Road bridge and through two more locks. The river and canal part at the base of the Hanwell flight of locks (92–97), after which it traverses Three Bridges, London, Isambard Brunel's final project. Two more locks take the canal to Norwood Green. It then heads westward over level ground through Southall, Hayes and Yiewsley until it reaches the gentle valley of the Colne.

Three miles (5 km) from Norwood on this long level is Bulls Bridge Junction, once the site of the Grand Union Canal Carrying Company's main dockyard. At Bulls Bridge, the Paddington Arm branches off to the north and runs 12 miles (19 km) to join the Regents Canal at Little Venice (see below). Just before Uxbridge is Cowley Peachey Junction, where the Slough Arm branches off westward.

At suburban Cowley, before the 1930s a rural village, the canal begins to climb the valley of the River Colne north-west into the adjoining town of Uxbridge. After Denham and Harefield villages, it passes to the south of Rickmansworth. Here it merges with the Rivers Chess, Colne and Gade. After Rickmansworth, the canal follows the valley of the Gade, passing the site of Croxley paper mill. The canal skirts Watford through Cassiobury Park, passing under the M25 motorway as it approaches Kings Langley.

Locks become more frequent as the climb into the Chiltern Hills steepens. The original four locks here were replaced in 1819 by five shallower ones to alleviate problems with water supply to the nearby paper mills. This realigned the canal to the south of its former course; the locks here are still referred to – without irony – as "The New 'Uns" by traditional boaters, and the term has been passed on to a new generation of canal users.

After Kings Langley and Apsley – the site of more former paper mills – the canal passes the town Hemel Hempstead and Boxmoor Common. From here the canal follows the course of the River Bulbourne through Bourne End with the well-known swingbridge at Winkwell, and the "Port of Berkhamsted, a small compact town". At Cow Roast Lock the canal reaches the 3-mile (5-km) summit at Tring in the Chiltern hills, having risen through 54 locks since Brentford.

At the north-west end of the summit level is Bulbourne Works, where lock gates were manufactured until 2003 for the southern canal network. Half a mile (800 m) further on, the canal reaches the top of the Marsworth flight of seven locks, which begin the descent to the Vale of Aylesbury. A Wendover Arm branches off westwards from the summit level under a bridge adjacent to Marsworth Top Lock and is currently navigable for just over a mile to moorings and a winding hole; it has restoration project to extend it back to Wendover. This part of the canal in parlance used by natives and canal staff was "the withered arm" and in fact was only really "opened" to allow the pumping station there to pump water into the uppermost level. A few hundred metres beyond the bottom lock of the flight, the Aylesbury Arm branches off to the south west.

The Grand Union descends gradually by interspersed locks, past the villages of Cheddington, Horton and Slapton until it reaches Leighton Buzzard. Traditionally this section of the canal is called "Slapton Fields" or just "The Fields" by boaters. A few miles further on, a flight of three locks near Soulbury marks the descent towards the valley of the River Great Ouse.

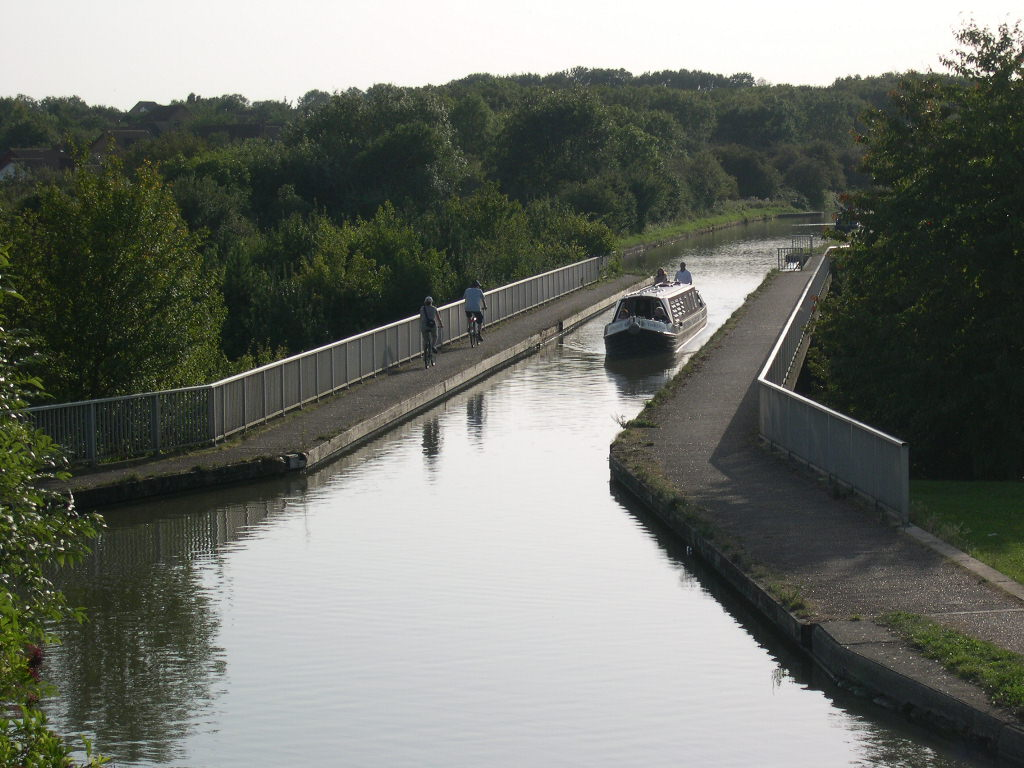
New Bradwell Aqueduct, Milton Keynes

A few miles further on it enters Milton Keynes at the outskirts of Bletchley at Fenny Stratford Lock, which is unusual in lowering the level by only 12 inches (30 cm). The next stretch of 11 miles (18 km) is on the level. There is a modern proposal to dig a new arm from here to the Great Ouse navigation at Bedford. North of the centre, it traverses the modern New Bradwell Aqueduct, the first on the Grand Union in over 100 years. Leaving Milton Keynes at Wolverton, the canal runs on a high embankment before passing over the Great Ouse at Cosgrove aqueduct (the "Iron Trunk aqueduct"), the first cast-iron "trough" aqueduct in England.

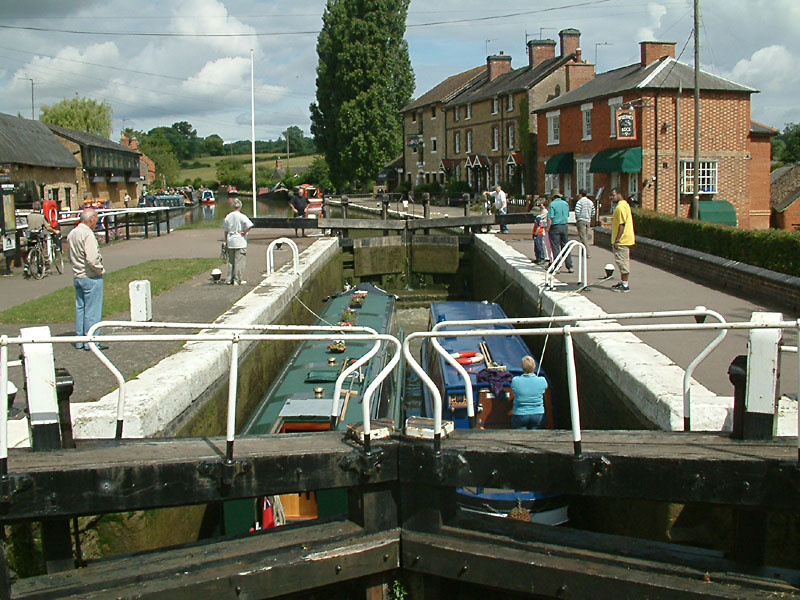
Top lock at Stoke Bruerne

After rising through Cosgrove Lock, (and passing the start of the abandoned Buckingham Arm) another long level section brings the canal to the bottom of the Stoke Bruerne flight of seven locks. At the top of this flight is the Stoke Bruerne Canal Museum followed shortly by Blisworth Tunnel, at 3,056 yards (2,794 m) one of the longest of UK canals.

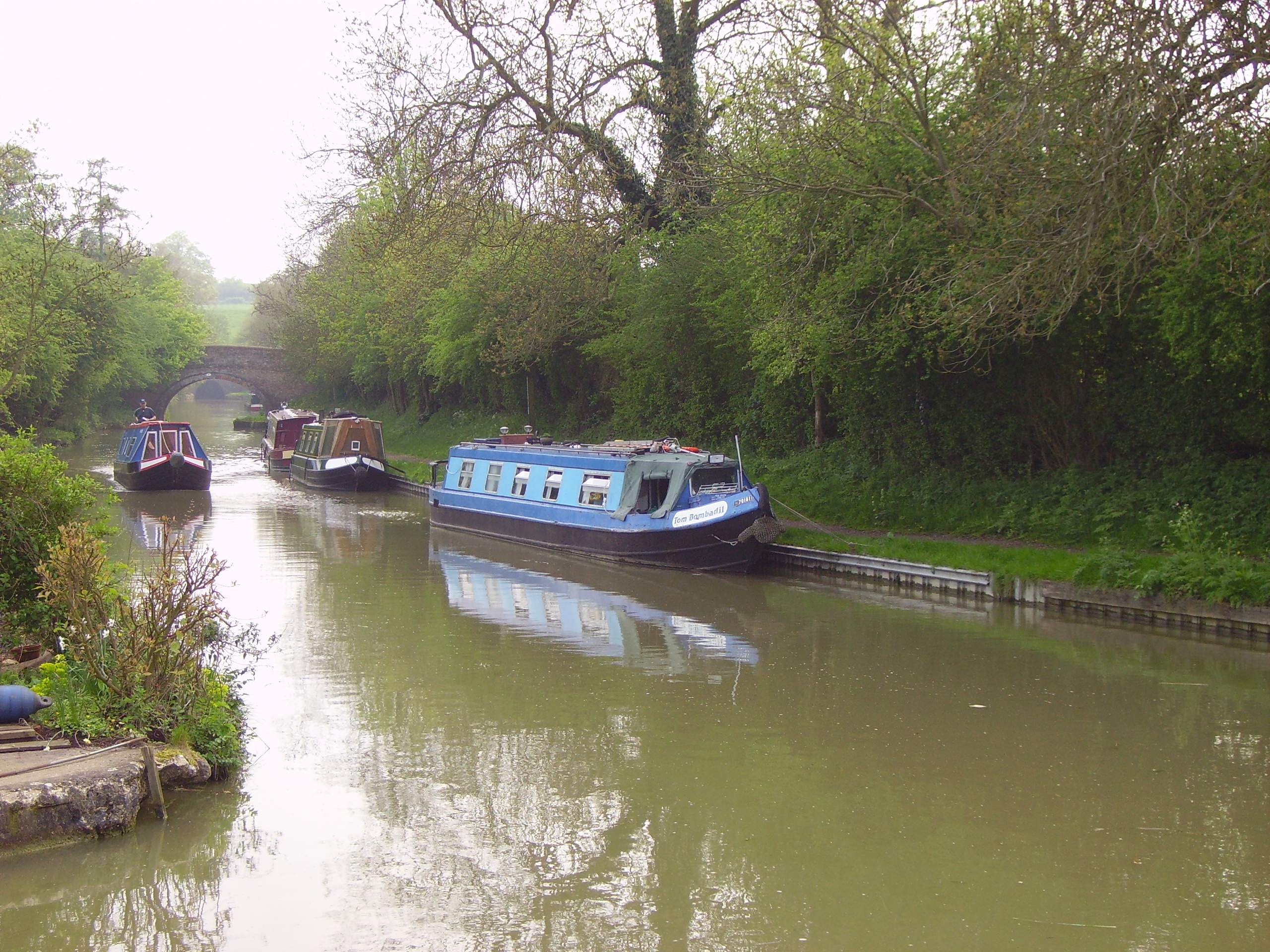
Crick Wharf, Northamptonshire

Once clear of the tunnel, the canal passes Blisworth village and reaches Gayton Junction where the Northampton Arm branches off to the east. This arm has 17 narrow locks as it descends to join the navigable River Nene (see below). The long level stretch continues past several villages including Nether Heyford and Weedon Bec and is very rural in character.

At Whilton, the canal reaches the bottom of the Buckby flight of seven locks which raise it to Braunston summit the village of which parish is 5 miles (8.0 km) away. Beyond the top lock is Norton Junction where the Leicester line (not strictly a branch) heads off north. A few miles further on the canal passes through the 2040-yard (1865-m) Braunston Tunnel, which pierces a low range of hills that are part of the Northamptonshire uplands.

The canal then drops down the Braunston flight of six locks until it reaches Braunston Junction having covered just over 93 miles (150 km).

== The Birmingham "main line" ==
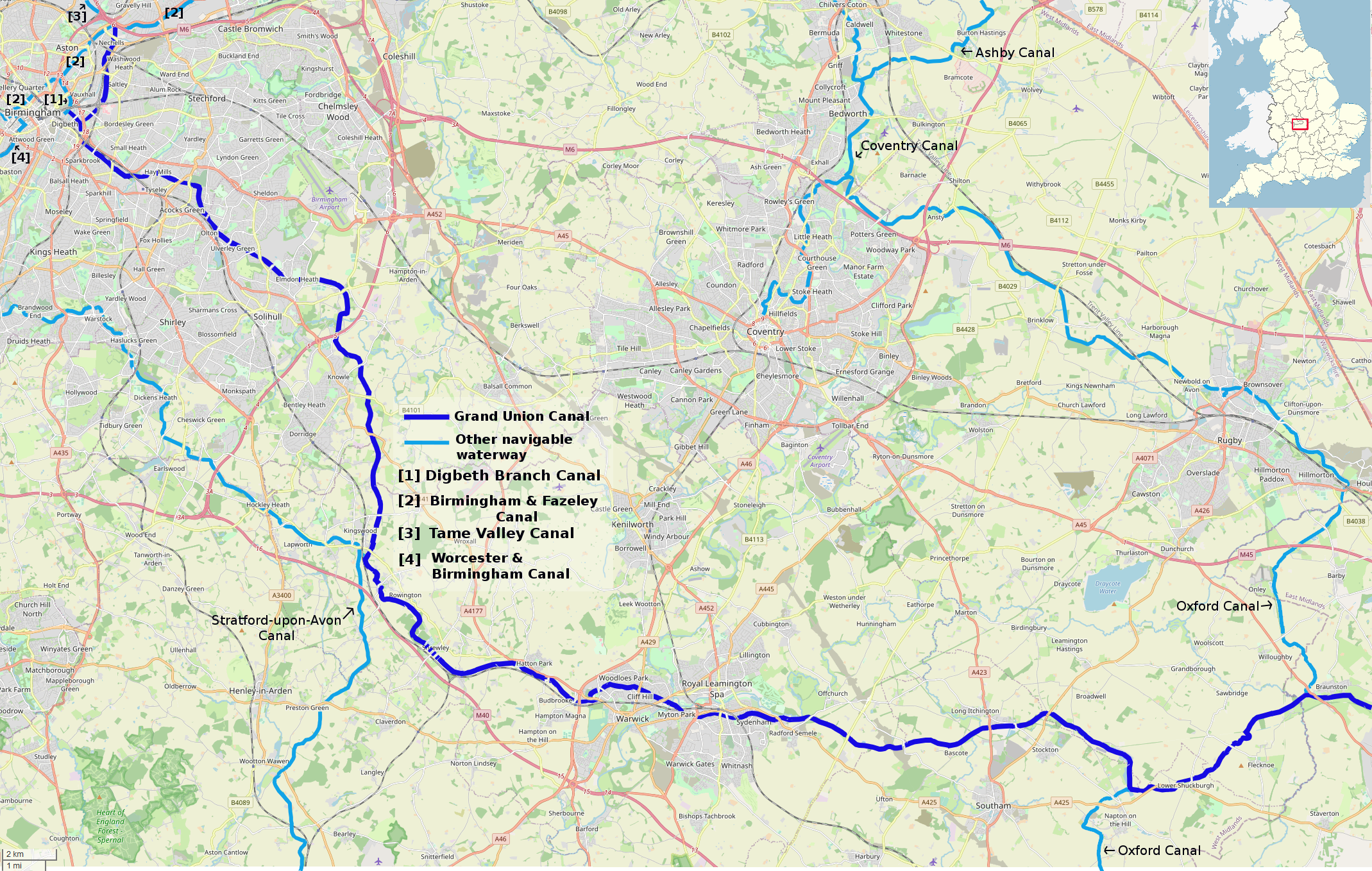
Geographic map of the Braunston to Birmingham section (zoom in for detail)

At Braunston Junction, the Oxford Canal diverges north and south. The north section leads to Rugby and Coventry; the southward fork carries both the Oxford Canal and the Grand Union for 5 miles (8.0 km) to Napton Junction. Here, the Grand Union heads north towards Birmingham, while the Oxford Canal veers south towards Banbury and Oxford.

Shortly after Napton Junction, the Grand Union reaches three locks at Calcutt, which begin the descent to the Warwickshire River Avon. After a 3-mile (5-km) level, the canal descends into the valley of the River Leam by the Stockton flight of 10 locks (often known as 'the Itchington Ten'). Above the eighth lock down the flight, a short arm (now used as pleasure craft moorings) used to serve Southam cement works. This was where the last regular cargo of cement was loaded heading for Birmingham in the late 1960s.

From the bottom of the locks, a 3-mile (5-km) level leads to the four Bascote Locks. The top two form a 'riser' or staircase. Six more interspersed locks lead to Radford, after which a 5-mile (8-km) level takes the canal through Leamington Spa to Warwick. Between these two towns, the canal crosses the River Avon and the former Great Western Railway on aqueducts.

At Warwick, the canal rises by two locks to Budbrooke Junction (formerly the junction with the then-independent Warwick and Birmingham Canal). To the left is the restored Saltisford Canal Arm, a short stretch that used to run under the railway to the original canal basin complex and terminus of the Warwick and Birmingham Canal – the basin was filled-in in the 1970s. The canal used to serve one of the oldest gasworks. Two hexagonal buildings that housed the gas holders are part of the world's oldest remaining gasworks buildings. After half a mile the mainline reaches the bottom of the Hatton flight of 21 locks that lift the canal up out of the Avon Valley. The first 10 locks are spaced out but from the middle lock the flight is tightly spaced.

Three miles (5 km) from Hatton Top Lock the canal passes through Shrewley Tunnel, with its separate horse tunnel, and then passes Rowington village to Kingswood Junction where a short spur connects with the Stratford-upon-Avon Canal. Another 3 miles (4.8 km) lead to the Knowle flight of five locks. Finally, an 11-mile (18-km) level takes the canal through Elmdon Heath, Solihull, Acocks Green and Tyseley to the heart of Birmingham.

The main line may be considered to terminate at Bordesley Junction. From here, there are two routes, both part of the Grand Union Canal. The original line of the Warwick and Birmingham Canal leads to the Digbeth Branch Canal of the Birmingham Canal Navigations at the Warwick Bar, while the later line of the Birmingham and Warwick Junction Canal leads to the Birmingham and Fazeley Canal (and Tame Valley Canal) at Salford Junction, which in turn has connections to the Coventry Canal and the Trent and Mersey Canal.

== The Leicester line ==
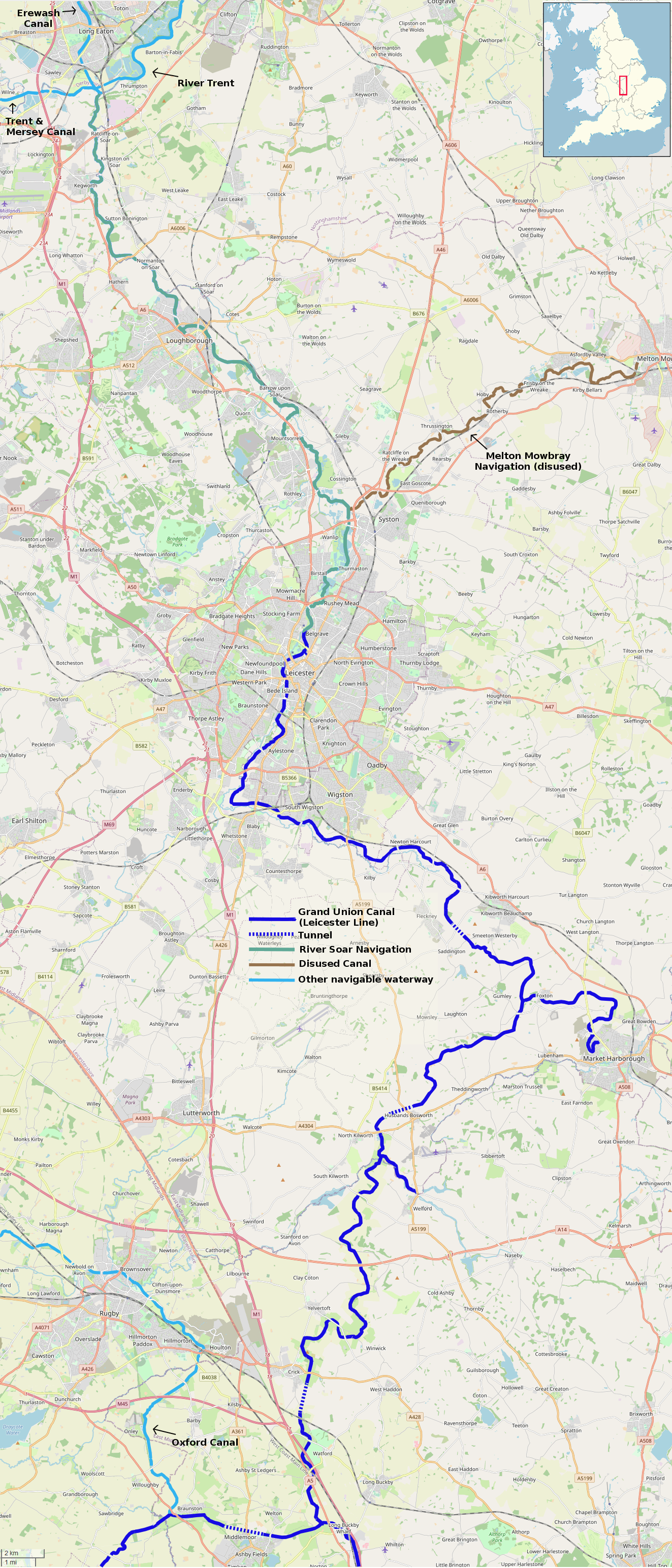
Geographic map of the Leicester Line and the River Soar Navigation (zoom in to see detail)

Formed by amalgamations of once-independent canals, the 'Leicester Line' of the Grand Union Canal runs north from Norton Junction for about 35 miles (56 km) until it reaches Leicester, where it joins the River Soar to provide a link to the River Trent and to the Trent and Mersey Canal. It includes tunnels south of Crick 1,528 yd (1,397 m) and north of Husbands Bosworth 1,166 yd (1,066 m) The village of Crick is home to a popular annual boat show.

The stretch of the canal that passes through the centre of Leicester is known as the 'Mile Straight' and is home to Leicester Rowing Club, a rowing and sculling club. The club hosts regattas on a stretch co-running with the Soar, typically held in mid-April by over 100 crews over a 770-yard (700 m) course.

Also on this section are the Foxton Locks and Watford Locks, both staircase locks. Beside Foxton locks is the site of a long-abandoned inclined plane boat lift. This was constructed as part of a project to create a wide-beam canal route to connect the northern and southern parts of the canal system, something which does not exist to this day. Funding to deal with the narrow locks at Watford was not forthcoming and the scheme was aborted. The canal north of Foxton Junction is wide-beam to Leicester and onwards. It was originally intended to build a canal at this width all the way to the River Nene at Northampton. However, that canal never went further than the basin at Market Harborough.

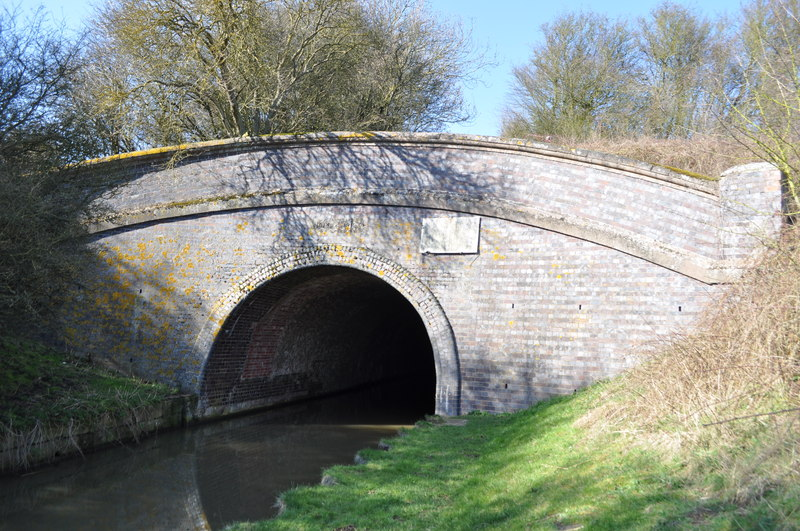
Saddington Tunnel on the Leicester Line.

The Leicester Line continues along the River Soar Navigation, and reaches the River Trent at Soar Mouth, north of Ratcliffe-on-Soar. It is possible to continue to the Trent and Mersey Canal, Coventry Canal and North Oxford Canal, to complete a circuit known as the Leicester Ring.

== Arms ==
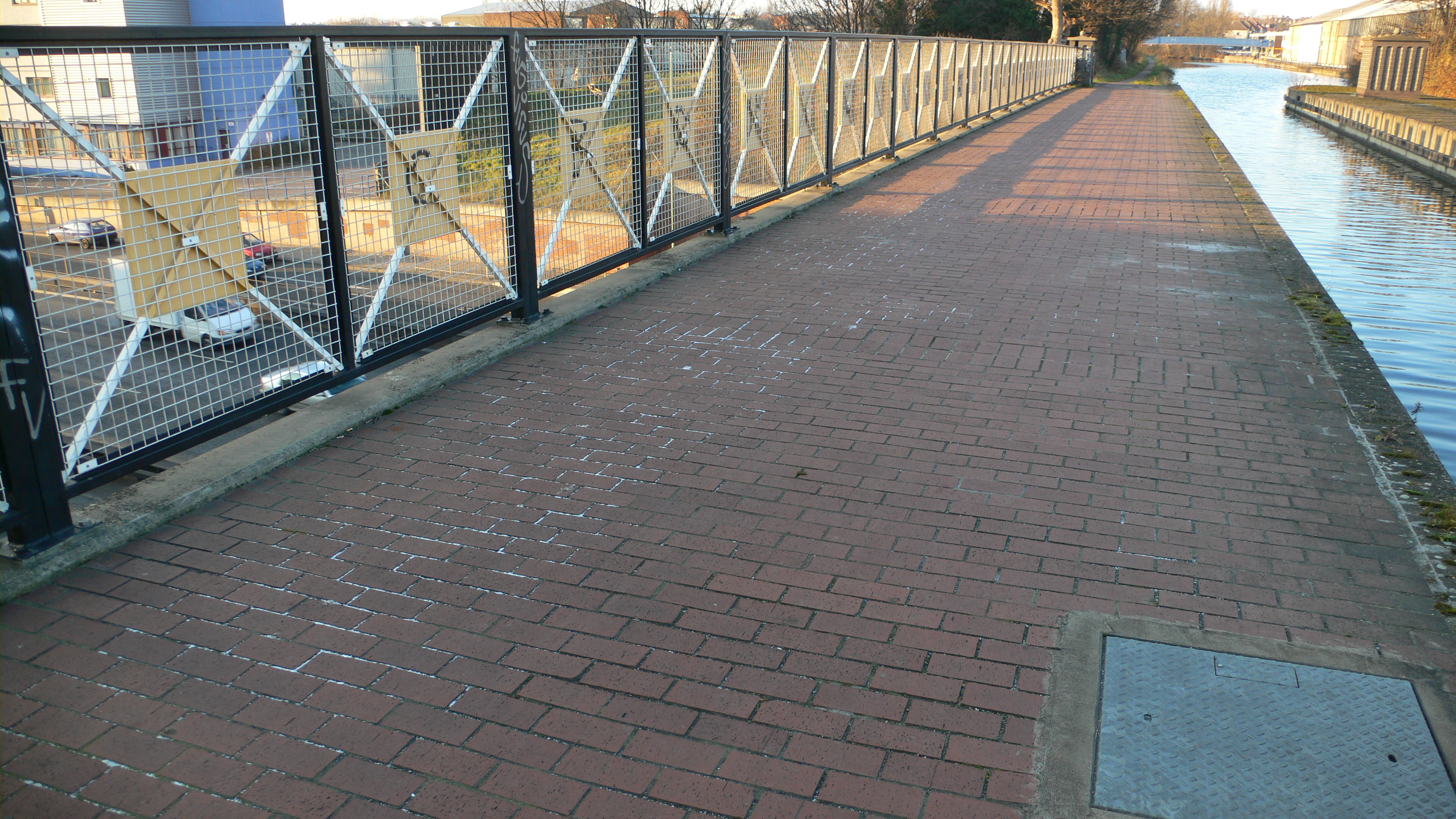
The Paddington Arm crossing the North Circular Road viewed from the east looking west

The Grand Union Canal has six main branches, usually termed 'arms'.

Paddington Arm

Five miles (eight km) from Brentford, the Paddington Arm runs circuitously on the flat to a junction with the Regent's Canal, the latter running north and east of Central London. The triangular canal basin formed by the junction is called the Little Venice in Maida Vale. The Arm's final 500 m runs south-east to Paddington Basin.

Slough Arm

From Cowley Peachey, the Slough Arm runs 5 miles (8.0 km) to the west.

Wendover and Aylesbury Arms

From Marsworth, about 35 miles (56 km) by canal from Brentford, two arms diverge: one to Wendover (currently in-part navigable as being restored by the Wendover Arm Trust;) the other descends through 16 narrow locks for 4 miles (6.4 km) to Aylesbury.

Northampton Arm

From Gayton Junction, about 60 miles (97 km) from Brentford, the Northampton Arm links with the River Nene.

Saltisford Canal Arm, Warwick

At Warwick the northernmost branch off of the Grand Union Canal (also known by regular users as the "GU"), the Saltisford Canal Arm begins. The restored arm is close to the centre of Warwick. It was originally the main line of the Warwick and Birmingham Canal, 1799, leading to the terminus and a basin with wharfs for timber. When the Warwick and Napton Canal opened, this bypassed channel remained as the town's wharf. The Saltisford Canal Trust have restored most of the surviving canal, 1990–2015, such as installing long lengths of sheet piling and restoring a warehouse in 2007. Its last 160 yards (150 m) were lost in the 1970s saving a disused road bridge that stands isolated in a car park. Warwick's narrowboat moorings are on the Arm by a public park partly in view of the Castle. Over 800 visiting narrowboats cruise to Warwick each year and moor on the arm.

The Leicester Line has two modest arms of its own, see Grand Union Canal (old).

== Current developments ==
=== Bedford & Milton Keynes Waterway ===
Bedford & Milton Keynes Waterway
- Location: Bedfordshire
- Proposer: Bedford and Milton Keynes Partnership
- Cost estimate: £170 million

The Bedford and Milton Keynes Waterway Consortium plans to build a 16-mile (26 km) canal connecting the Grand Union at Milton Keynes to the River Great Ouse at Bedford at an estimated cost of £150 million. The project is supported by British Waterways (and its successor, the Canal & River Trust), the Bedford & Milton Keynes Waterway Trust, other waterways campaign groups, and also local councils. The first element of the canal is an underpass under the A421, completed in 2009 and efforts are continuing to obtain funding to complete the scheme in 'bite-size chunks'. The new waterway would create a new cruising ring connecting through from the Grand Union to the waterways of East Anglia which are beneficial to leisure cruising as tourists are able to follow circular routes, as well as completing a missing link between the north and south of the UK for wide-beam boats – all current inland waterways have restrictive pinch points around the Midlands, only suited to narrowboats, effectively dividing wide-beam cruising grounds into two disconnected halves.

The history of the proposal is considerably older; the route was first discussed in 1810, when its promoters included Samuel Whitbread.

From Milton Keynes, the canal is planned to pass beneath the M1 using an existing cattle creep, then cross over Brogborough Hill, and across the Marston Vale through to the River Great Ouse in Kempston.

=== Buckingham Arm restoration ===
The Buckingham Arm once ran from Cosgrove, Northamptonshire to Buckingham. It was built as an arm of the Grand Junction Canal, in two separate phases, opening in 1800 and 1801. It was disused from 1932, but was not finally abandoned until 1964. It is now the subject of a restoration project.

=== Slough-Eton canal ===
The predecessor to the Canal and River Trust, British Waterways, received mild financial support indications from the two local authorities covering Slough and Eton, Berkshire to extend the Slough Arm to join the Thames, via any course i.e. covering a minimum 2 miles (3.2 km); the 2008-estimated cost was £30 million. The trust confirmed in 2012 this remains a long-term objective, to be actioned when the economic conditions allow.

== Gallery ==
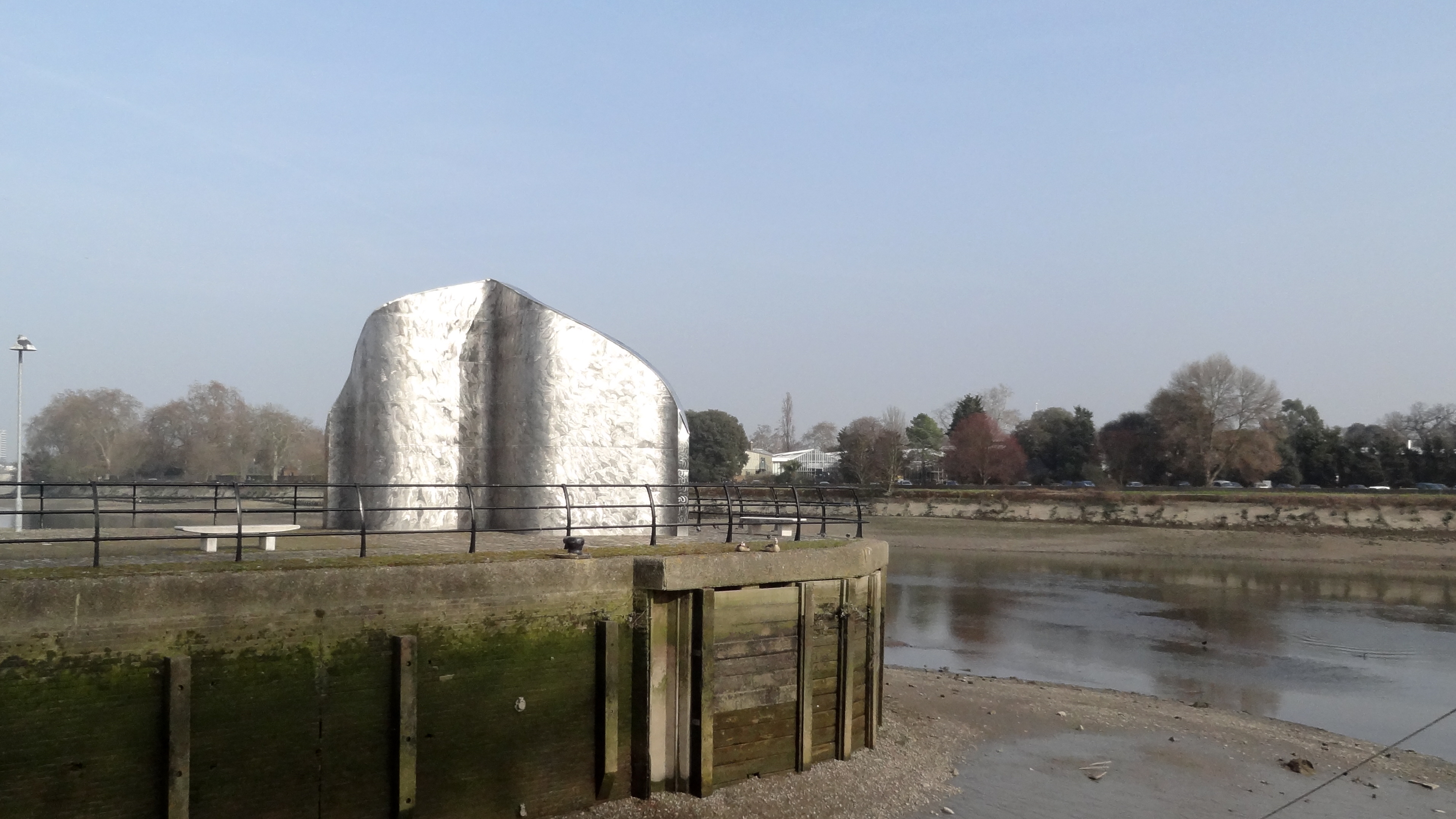
Bulky shining sculpture or landmark, Liquidity erected 2002 at the apex Ferry Wharf, Brentford, marking a then-dry entrance to the Grand Union Canal from the River Thames's Tideway as at low tide.

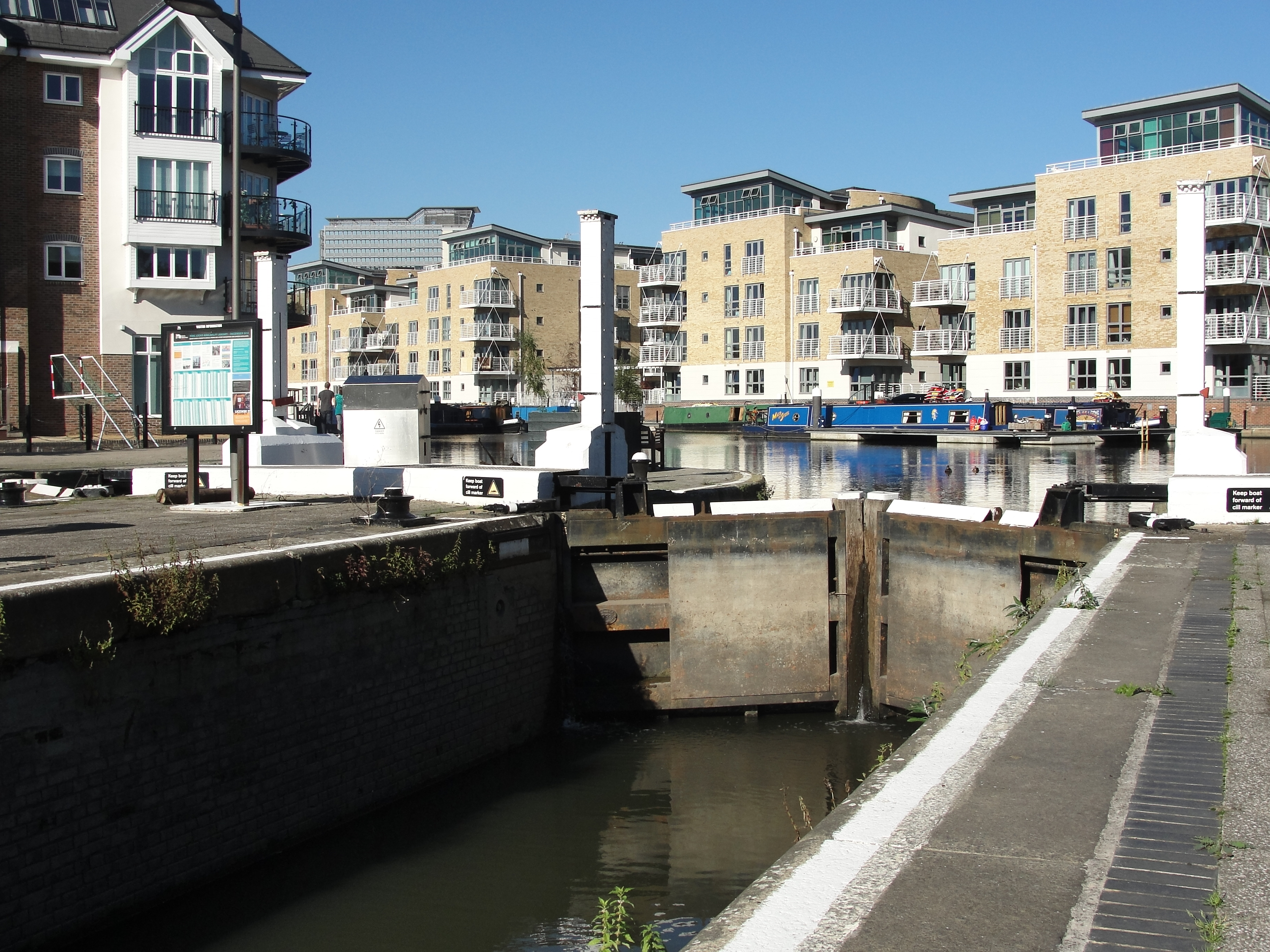
Brentford Locks, London

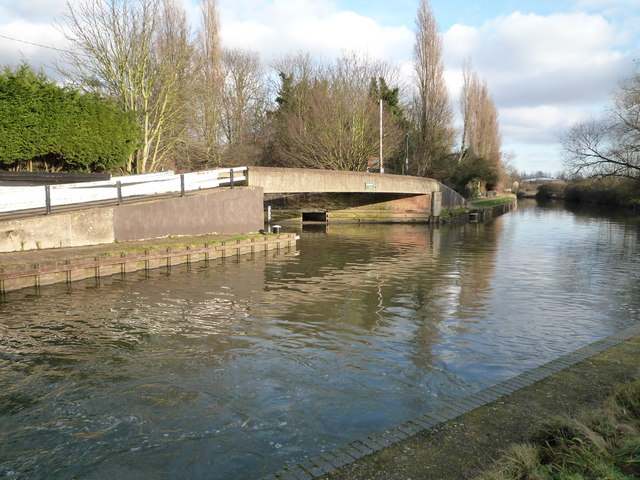
Confluence with the River Brent, London

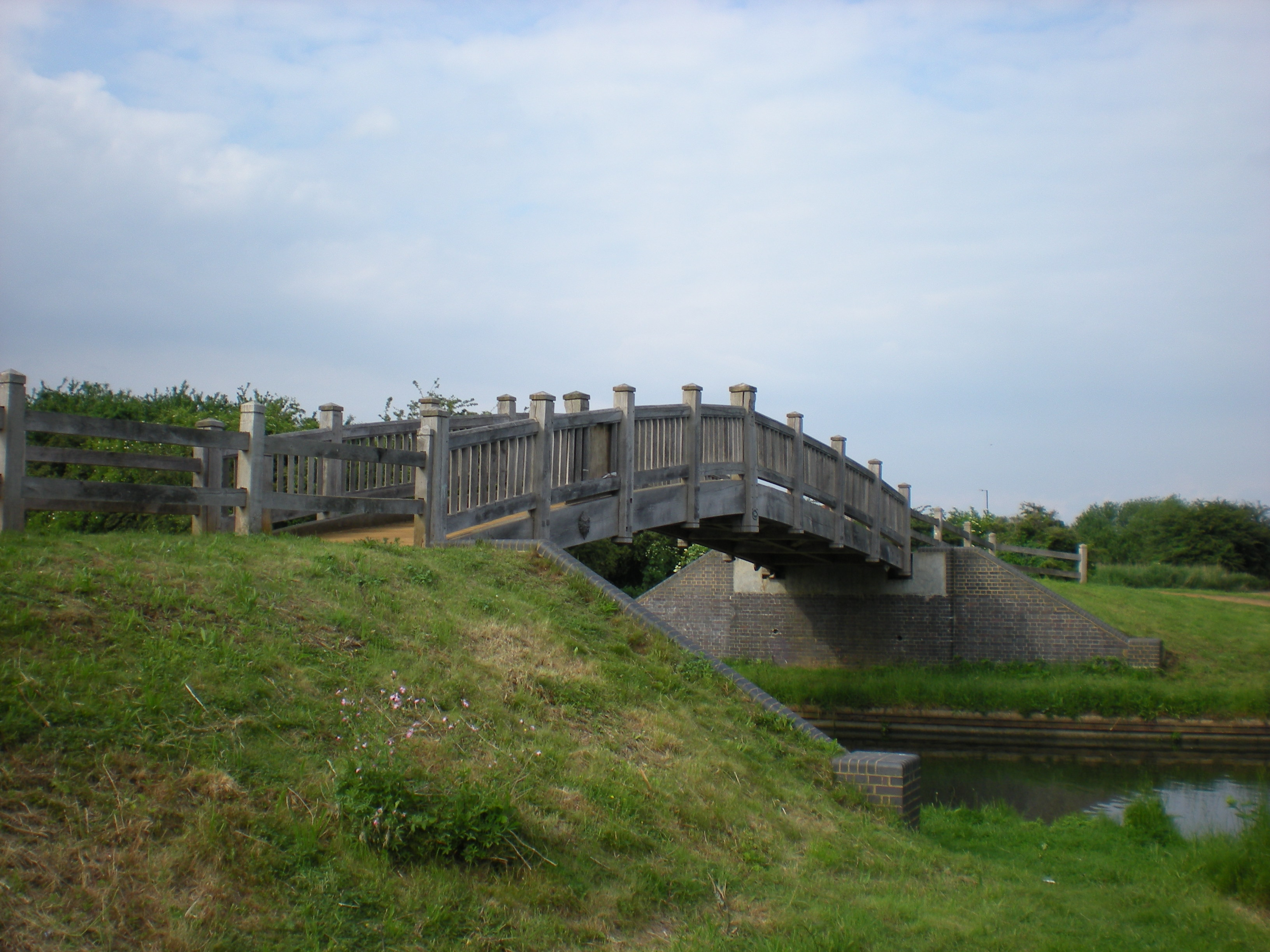
Wooden bridge across the canal at Northolt, London

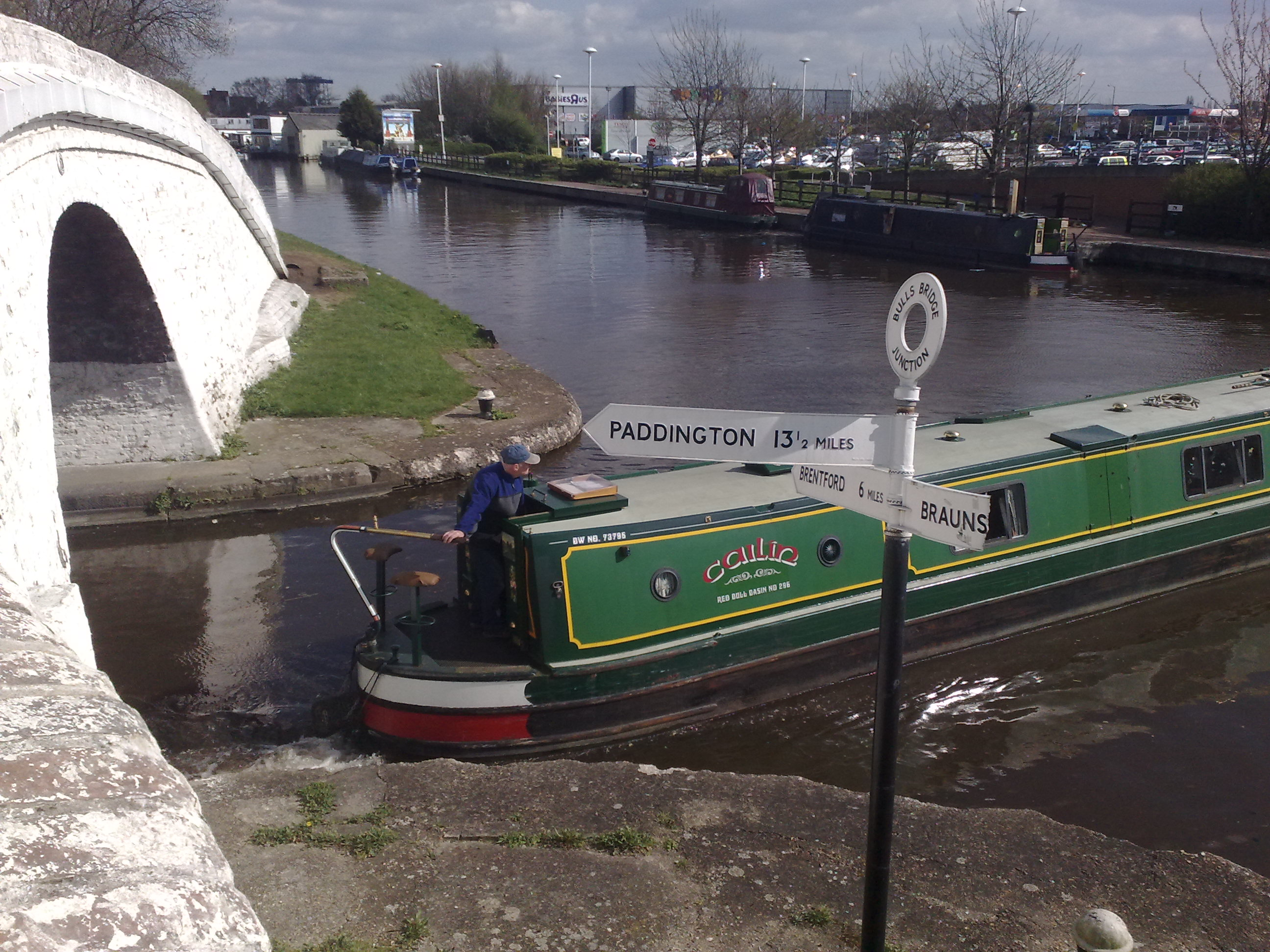
Bull's Bridge Junction in the eastern distribution-centred part of Hayes, west London

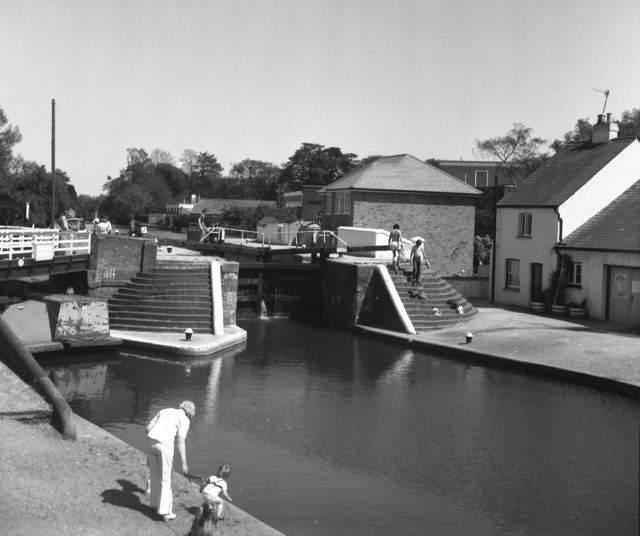
Batchworth Lock No 81, (in 1977)

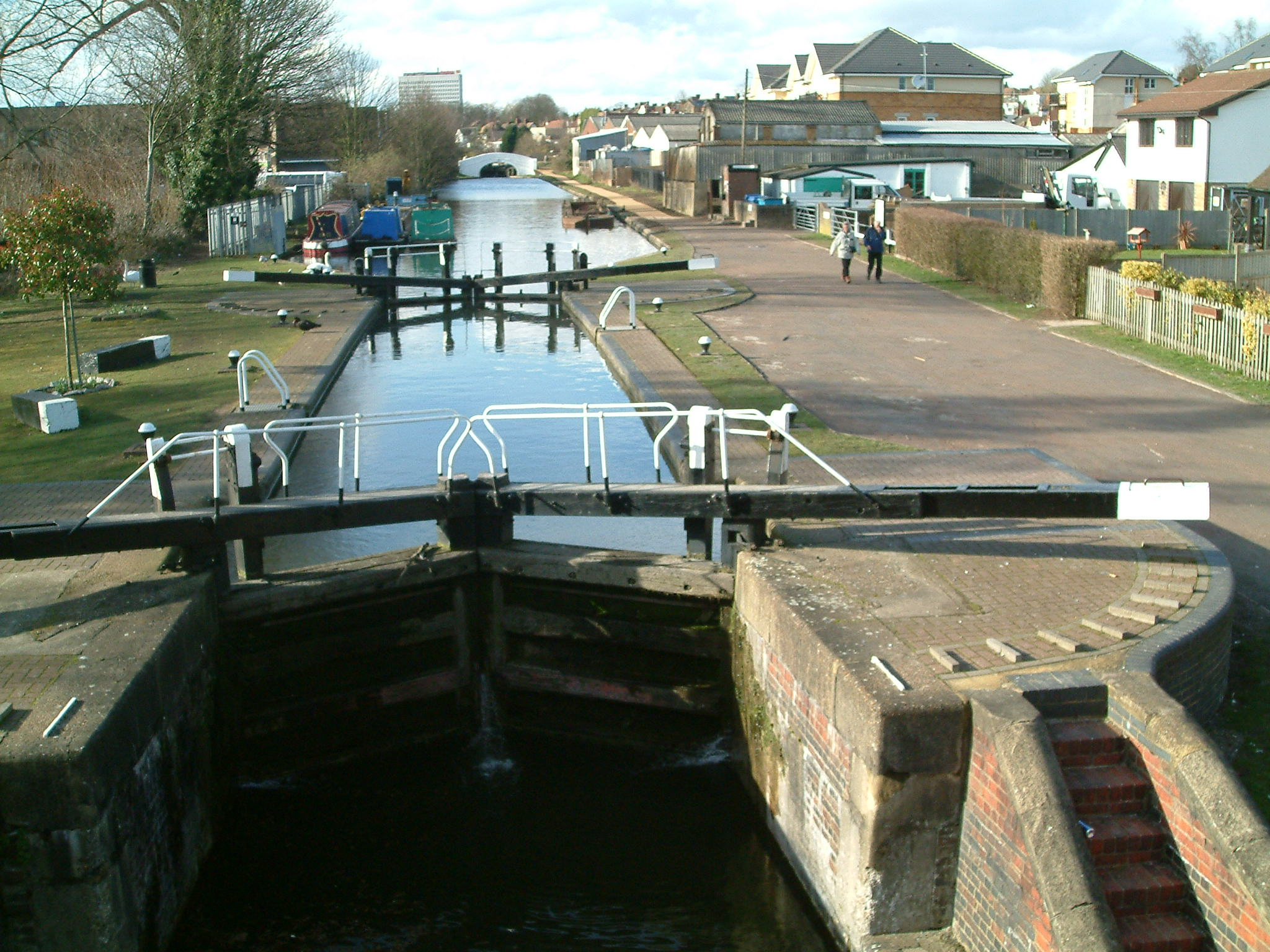
A lock and upstream tract to a white humpback bridge at Apsley, Hertfordshire

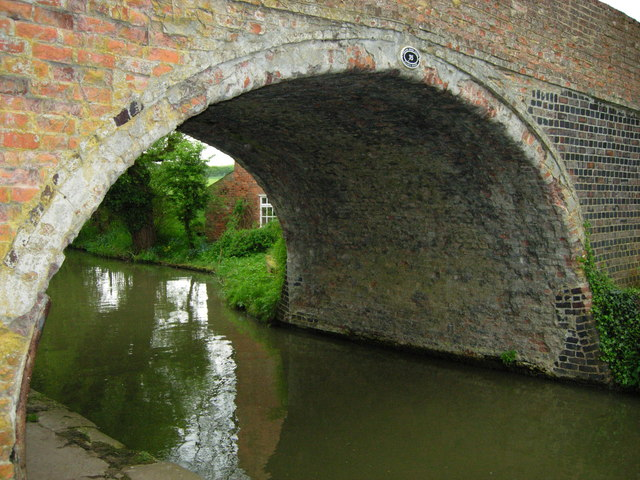
The canal near Bugbrooke, Northamptonshire

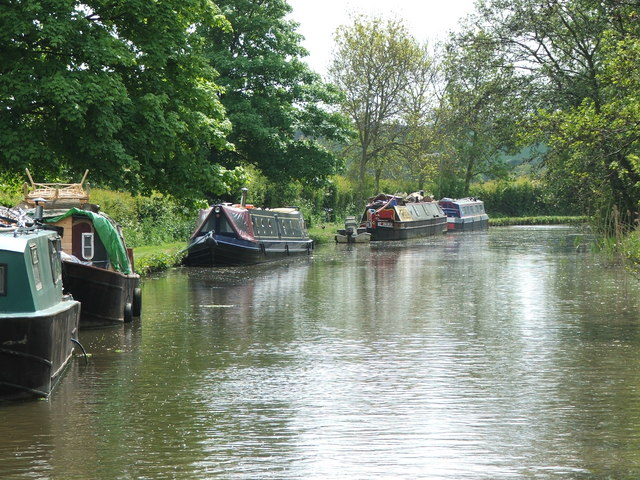
The canal near Nether Heyford, Northamptonshire

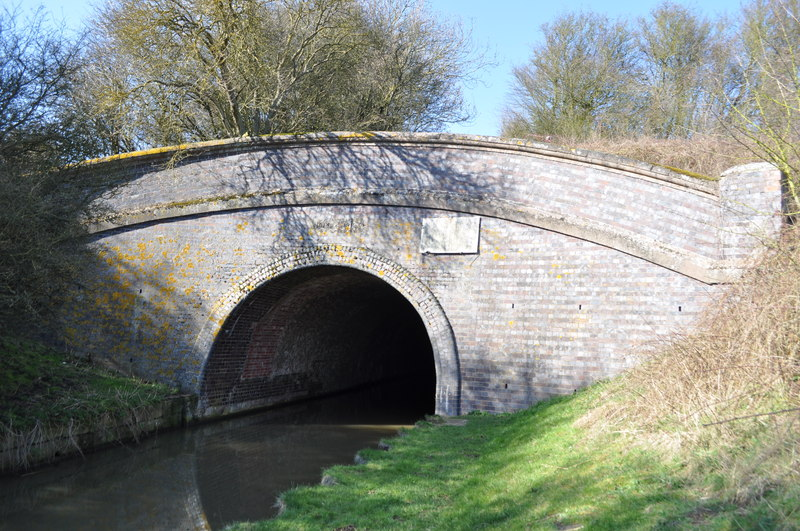
Saddington Tunnel, Leicestershire

== See also ==
- List of canals of the United Kingdom
- Grand Union Canal 145 mile Race
- Wendover Arm Canal
- List of locks on the Grand Union Canal
