= James Barnes (engineer) =

James Barnes (ca. 1739 – 1819) was a canal and railway engineer in England and twice Mayor of Banbury.

== Career ==
In May 1786, Barnes was appointed Surveyor of the Works for the Oxford Canal Company at a salary of £50 per annum. His role was to engineer the completion of the Oxford Canal south from Banbury to Oxford which had been designed by Robert Whitworth. His contract was for completion of the canal by the start of 1791, but this was achieved one year early. By 1791 his salary had risen to £200 (equivalent to £26,100 in 2025). The success of the work with the Oxford Canal Company led an agreement with George Nugent-Temple-Grenville, 1st Marquess of Buckingham to survey a route from Braunston to London which resulted in the formation of the Grand Junction Canal. The plan was approved in 1792.

In 1799 he prepared plans for a route from the Leicestershire and Northamptonshire Union Canal to Braunston, but this was not proceeded with. In 1802 a revised plan was prepared with a route to Norton Junction, and following review by Thomas Telford this plan was approved and became the Grand Union Canal (old).

He resigned from the Grand Junction Canal Company in 1805.

== Works ==
- Grand Junction Canal 1793 - 1805
- Wendover Arm Canal 1794
- Braunston Tunnel 1794 – 1796 (with William Jessop)
- Paddington Arm 1801
- Buckingham branch canal 1801
- Blisworth Tunnel 1802–1805 (with William Jessop)
- Grand Union Canal (old) 1802 (plans)
- Carmarthenshire Railway 1803 - 1805
- Aylesbury branch canal (opened 1814)
- Northampton branch canal (opened 1815)

== Life ==
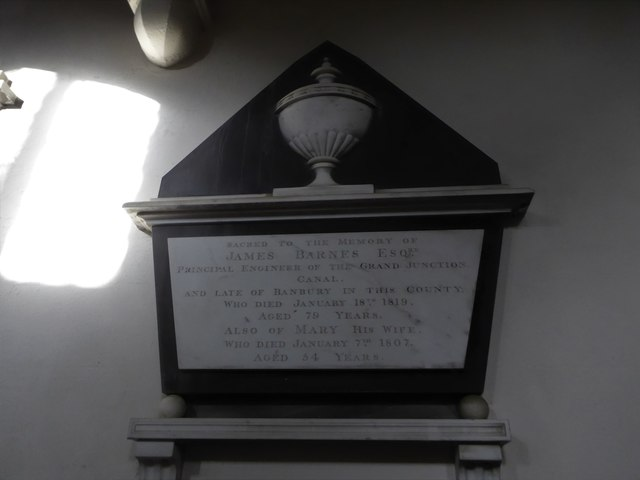
Memorial in St John the Baptist's Church, Bodicote

In 1801 and again in 1809 he was Mayor of Banbury.

His daughter Mary, married Richard Austin on 14 July 1803. Richard Austin acquired an interest in Dunnell Brewery, North Bar, Banbury, and James was also involved in this business.

His wife Mary died on 7 January 1807 aged 54.

He died on 18 January 1819 and was buried on 25 January in St John the Baptist's Church, Bodicote. A memorial was erected in the church where is he proudly described as the ‘Principal Engineer of the Grand Junction Canal’.
