= Buckingham Arm =

English canal

Buckingham Canal (former Buckingham Arm)
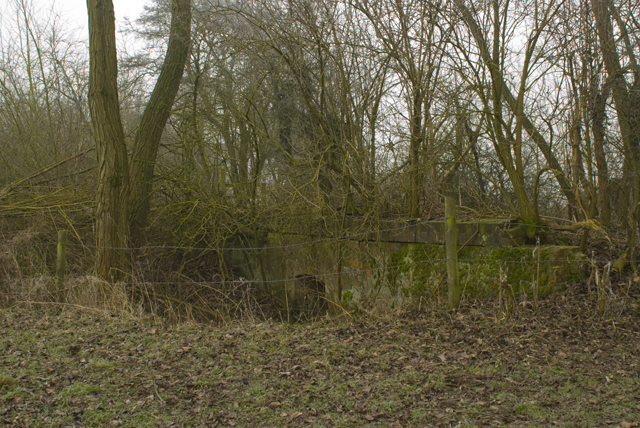
- Cattleford aqueduct carried the canal over a small stream to the east of Foscote Reservoir

Specifications
- Locks: 2
- Status: Restoration project

History
- Date of act: 1793, 1794
- Date of first use: 1800
- Date completed: 1801
- Date closed: 1932

Geography
- Start point: Cosgrove
- End point: Buckingham
- Connects to: Grand Union Canal

The Buckingham Arm is an English canal that once ran from Cosgrove, Northamptonshire to Buckingham. It was built as an arm of the Grand Junction Canal in two separate phases, a broad canal to Old Stratford, which opened in 1800 and a narrow canal onwards to Buckingham, which opened in 1801. It was disused from 1932, and was dammed at the first bridge in 1944 to reduce leakage from the Grand Union Canal, as the Grand Junction had then become known, but was not finally abandoned until 1964. The remains were severed by the construction of new roads in the 1970s and again in the late 1980s. The section through Old Stratford and Deanshanger was sold off in the 1990s, and the route there has been lost to housing development. The Buckingham Canal Society was formed in 1992, and is actively pursuing a restoration programme. Some 440 yards (400 m) of the canal near Buckingham are now holding water, but the main focus in 2020 was at the Cosgrove end, where a restored channel would be accessible by boat from the Grand Union. Progress was made in September 2023, when 550 yards (500 m) of canal were reopened to navigation.

== History ==
On 30 April 1793, the Grand Junction Canal was authorised by the Grand Junction Canal Act 1793 (33 Geo. 3. c. 80), and the act made provision for an arm from the main line to Old Stratford, ending at the former Roman road of Watling Street, which was a major communications route. The continuation to Buckingham was surveyed in 1793, and included in the Grand Junction Canal Act 1794 (34 Geo. 3. c. 24), passed in March 1794, which authorised the construction of the Aylesbury, Buckingham and Wendover arms.

The initial section to Old Stratford was to be constructed as a broad canal, capable of use by boats which were 14 feet (4.3 m) wide. The Grand Junction Canal had to cross the River Great Ouse at Wolverton, and the original plan was to construct a crossing on the level, with a flight of locks down one side of the valley and another up the other side. The Old Stratford branch would have had a junction with the main line at the lowest level, and followed the course of the Great Ouse valley. From Old Stratford, the canal was to continue as a 7-foot (2.1 m) narrow canal, which would have joined the river at Passenham, effectively becoming a navigation, as a number of locks would have been needed along the course of the river. The plans were changed when it was decided to construct a high level crossing of the Great Ouse, ruling out the possibility of a junction, and so the arm left the main line just above Cosgrove lock, following the north side of the Great Ouse valley, and resulted in a canal which was on one level for most of its length, with just two locks as it approached Buckingham.

The Grand Junction Canal, which included the two flights of locks to cross the River Great Ouse, opened in August 1800, and the Old Stratford arm followed six weeks later, in September. The Buckingham branch progressed quickly and was built in 8 months. A formal opening occurred on 1 May 1801, with celebrations as Buckingham. The canal was supplied with water by a feeder from the Great Ouse in Buckingham. The lock flights on the main line were replaced by two embankments and an aqueduct in 1805, but there were problems with the aqueduct, and it was replaced with an iron trough in 1811. The Grand Junction public house was built in the High Street in the early 1800s near to Buckingham Wharf, which was the terminus of the Buckingham Arm. For a while in the 21st century, the pub was known as 'Number Thirteen', as the building is located at No.12 and 13 High Street, but in 2019 it was bought by Oakman Inns, who intended to return its name to The Grand Junction as part of a major refurbishment scheme for the historic building.

By the 1850s, the canal was suffering from competition from the railways, and the water supply from the river contained much silt, which was deposited in the canal, making navigation difficult. Buckingham Corporation also used the canal as a disposal point for sewage, which added to the problems. Trade continued to reduce, with the Grand Junction company resorting to legal action to prevent the dumping of sewage into the canal in 1890, but Bradshaw's Guide of 1904 lists the upper section as "barely navigable".

=== Decline ===
In 1919, a section of the canal near Mount Mill Farm was replaced by a concrete trough, in an attempt to reduce leakage. The last recorded commercial traffic was a delivery of chemicals to Leckhampstead in 1932. The arm was blocked at the first bridge in 1944, as a precaution against further leakage, and the temporary dam was never removed. Following a protest cruise on the nearby Aylesbury Arm, the Inland Waterways Association (IWA) tried to promote the idea of restoring the Buckingham Arm in 1961, but there were few local members, and closure of the canal was supported by the local authorities through which the arm ran. The Northampton Chronicle and Echo ran an article on 24 March 1961, suggesting the section from the Grand Union junction to Old Stratford should be re-opened for its amenity value, following which a local IWA member called R. Faulkner tried to form an action committee, but again, there was little interest locally. W. L. Ives, a senior official of British Waterways, presented a paper which outlined the problems of the waterways on 3 November 1961, calling for changes to the way closures and abandonment of canals were handled. Later that month, the Minister of Transport, in dealing with the British Transport Commission bill, stated that no changes which would adversely affect navigation of the first section of the canal would be made immediately. The Buckingham branch was formally abandoned by the British Transport Commission Act 1962 (10 & 11 Eliz. 2. c. xlii), but the Old Stratford branch was not. Despite this, the Old Stratford branch was severed by the new route of the A5 road, constructed in 1975/6, and Old Stratford basin was sold in 1991. Most of the route through Old Stratford and the nearby village of Deanshanger was sold, and buildings now prevent reinstatement of that section. The route of the Buckingham branch was severed by the construction of the A422 Old Stratford Bypass in 1989/90.

== Restoration ==
The overall arm is closed, with the exception of a short stretch of about 200 metres running westwards from the junction with the Grand Union Canal at Cosgrove towards the A5 dual carriageway and a 400-metre section at Buckingham which was restored in 2013. (The Grand Junction Canal became part of the Grand Union Canal in 1929.) Beyond the A5, the canal can still be followed as a trench running through open fields as far as Old Stratford, where a housing estate has been built over the route of the canal. Other remnants of the route are decipherable in the landscape as far as Buckingham.

Buckingham Canal Society was formed in 1992, initially with the aim of clearance and photography of the remains. With encouragement from British Waterways, who still owned part of the route, cutting down of the vegetation began on the section from Cosgrove to the A5 road. As the society grew, the restoration of the remains and reinstatement of navigation along the arm became the new aim. Other sections of the route have been tackled as negotiations with landowners have resulted in permissive access. In 2008, the structure of Hyde Lane lock was refurbished, following a grant of £38,000 from Waste Recycling Environmental Limited (WREN) towards the £44,000 cost of the project. This enabled the lock to be restored professionally.

In 2010, Halcrow Engineering produced a report, which assessed whether the aim of restoration was realistic. While it identified a number of significant issues, including the crossings of the A5 road at Old Stratford and the A413 ringroad at Buckingham, it concluded that reinstatement was feasible, and would bring economic, environmental and social benefits to the area. One possible solution to the A413 crossing would be to terminate the canal outside the ringroad, where there would be room for a new terminal basin which could form the centrepiece of other development. The estimated cost for the restoration was put at £64 million. One interesting aspect of the project is that the original Grand Junction Canal Act 1794 was not repealed when the canal was abandoned, and therefore its powers still apply. This should make it somewhat easier to achieve the aims of the society than might otherwise be the case.

Plans for restoration include the construction of a 3-mile (4.8 km) bypass around Old Stratford and Deanshanger, starting with a short, steep section from near the A5 bridge to the River Great Ouse some 33 feet (10 m) lower. The canal would run close to the river, to pass under the A5 and the grade II listed bridge that carries Watling Street over the river. It would then divert from the river and ascend back to its original level, passing through the site of Passenham Quarry, to rejoin the former course at Mount Hill, close to where the A422 road severed the Buckingham Arm. A further detour will be required at Leckhampstead Wharf, where buildings occupy the line of the canal, and at Bourton Lock, which lies beneath the foundations of a modern house.

Following a grant of £7,000 from the Aylesbury Vale Community Chest, which unlocked a further £70,000 from the Landfill tax administered by Waste Recycling Environmental (WREN), work began in January 2013 on the relining, restoration and rewatering of a 425-yard (389 m) section of the canal at Bourton Meadow, close to Buckingham. The canal was largely intact at that location, and although in private ownership, the restoration was fully supported by the landowners. A ceremonial first sod was cut on 25 January by Lord Boswell of Aynho and John Bercow, the local MP and Speaker of the House of Commons. The bed was lined with a Bentoline liner, and the towpath was reconstructed. Bentoline is a product which consists of a thick, reinforced fibre layer, into which a layer of bentonite clay is embedded. The clay is retained by an upper layer of synthetic geotextile material. In order to maintain water levels on this section, a solar powered pump was installed during the winter of 2016/2017, which pumps water from the River Great Ouse.

The first section of canal that the group intends to reopen for boats is the stretch from Cosgrove to the A5 road near Old Stratford. Bridge 1, where the canal was dammed in 1944, was bulldozed into the canal in the late 1960s, to create a crossing for farm vehicles. In 2017 the Society received a grant of £70,000 from the rural development LEADER fund, which enabled them to find that much of the structure was still intact. The replacement bridge consists of wide brick piers, with a modern steel and concrete structure on top, but retaining the remains of the original bridge beneath. This approach means that combine harvesters up to 14.4 feet (4.4 m) wide and weighing 40 tons can still use it to access nearby farmland. In mid-2021, the canal between bridge 1 and bridge 2 was divided into three sections, which were being gradually rewatered to allow the clay to rehydrate, and an agreement had been reached with the Canal and River Trust to allow investigative work to be carried out on bridge 2.

On 2 September 2023, a 550-yard (500 m) length of the canal beyond bridge 1 was formally opened by the actor David Suchet. The stop planks beneath the bridge were removed by a recently acquired dredger named Diana, the purchase of which was funded by Tim Coghlan, the owner of Braunston Marina. The boat is named after Coghlan's wife Diana, who died in 2014.

Buckinghamshire County Council have produced a leaflet entitled The Ouse Valley Walk, which describes a walk from Buckingham to Milton Keynes, and covers most of the canal's route.

== Points of interest ==
Point	Coordinates (Links to map resources)	OS Grid Ref	Notes
Jn with Grand Union Canal	52.0729°N 0.8424°W	SP794422	Cosgrove lock
Old Stratford Wharf	52.0639°N 0.8621°W	SP781412	
Deanshanger Bridge	52.0506°N 0.8879°W	SP763397	
A422 crossing	52.0414°N 0.8880°W	SP763386	
Cattleford Aqueduct	52.0205°N 0.9196°W	SP742363	
Hyde Lane Lock	52.0116°N 0.9409°W	SP727353	
Bourton Lock	52.0013°N 0.9672°W	SP709341	
A413 crossing	51.9959°N 0.9699°W	SP708335	
Buckingham Lower Wharf	52.0024°N 0.9781°W	SP702342	
Buckingham Terminus Wharf	52.0021°N 0.9830°W	SP699342	

== See also ==
- Canals of the United Kingdom
- History of the British canal system

== Bibliography ==
- Beckett, Athina (Spring 2008). "Chairman's Chat" (PDF). Buckingham Navigator. Buckingham Canal Society. Archived (PDF) from the original on 11 December 2020.
- Cavender, Terry (Winter 2010). "Why bother applying for planning if you don't need it?" (PDF). Buckingham Navigator. Buckingham Canal Society. Archived (PDF) from the original on 11 December 2020.
- Cavender, Terry (Summer 2021). "Restoration Site update" (PDF). Buckingham Navigator. No. 108. Buckingham Canal Society. Archived (PDF) from the original on 18 June 2021.
- Cumberlidge, Jane (2009). Inland Waterways of Great Britain (8th Ed.). Imray Laurie Norie and Wilson. ISBN 978-1-84623-010-3.
- Denny, Andrew (June 2018). "Bucks Fizz". Waterways World. Waterways World. ISSN 0309-1422.
- Freeman, Michael (Summer 2010). "How it all began Part II" (PDF). Buckingham Navigator. Buckingham Canal Society. Archived (PDF) from the original on 11 December 2020.
- Lucas, Damien (11 July 2019). "New owners of historic Buckingham pub invite residents to public exhibition of planning proposals". Buckingham and Winslow Advertiser. Archived from the original on 5 May 2020.
- Miles, Steve (2020). "History of the Canal". Buckingham Canal Society. Archived from the original on 22 February 2020.
- Preston, Helen (Summer 2010). "Restoration gets a green light" (PDF). Buckingham Navigator. Buckingham Canal Society. Archived (PDF) from the original on 11 December 2020.
- Riden, Philip; Insley, Charles, eds. (2002). "A History of the County of Northampton: Volume 5: The Hundred of Cleley". Victoria County History. British History Online.
- Squires, Roger (2008). Britain's restored canals. Landmark Publishing. ISBN 978-1-84306-331-5.
