= Grand Junction Canal =

English canal

Coordinates: 51°52′N 0°39′W

The Grand Junction Canal is a canal in England from Braunston in Northamptonshire to the River Thames at Brentford, with a number of branches. The mainline was built between 1793 and 1805, to improve the route from the Midlands to London, by-passing the upper reaches of the River Thames near Oxford, thus shortening the journey.

In 1927 the canal was bought by the Regent's Canal Company and, since 1 January 1929, has formed the southern half of the Grand Union Main Line from London to Birmingham. The canal is now much used by leisure traffic.

Isambard Kingdom Brunel's last major undertaking was the compact Three Bridges, London, on the canal. Work began in 1856, and was completed in 1859. The three bridges are an overlapping arrangement allowing the routes of the Grand Junction Canal, Great Western and Brentford Railway, and Windmill Lane to cross.

== History ==
=== Need ===
By 1790, an extensive network of canals was in place, or under construction, in the Midlands. However, the only route to London was via the Oxford Canal to the River Thames at Oxford, and then down the river to the capital. The river, particularly the upper reaches, was in a poor condition for navigation compared with the modern canals. The river suffered from shallow sections and shortage of water leading to delays at locks, and there were frequent conflicts with mill owners over water supplies.

In 1791–92, two surveys of a route from Brentford on the Thames to Braunston on the Oxford Canal were carried out, first by James Barnes and then by William Jessop. There were other proposals for an alternative direct route to London, and two bills were put to Parliament, but it was the bill for the Grand Junction Canal which was passed on 30 April 1793 as the Grand Junction Canal Act 1793 (33 Geo. 3. c. 80).

=== Construction ===
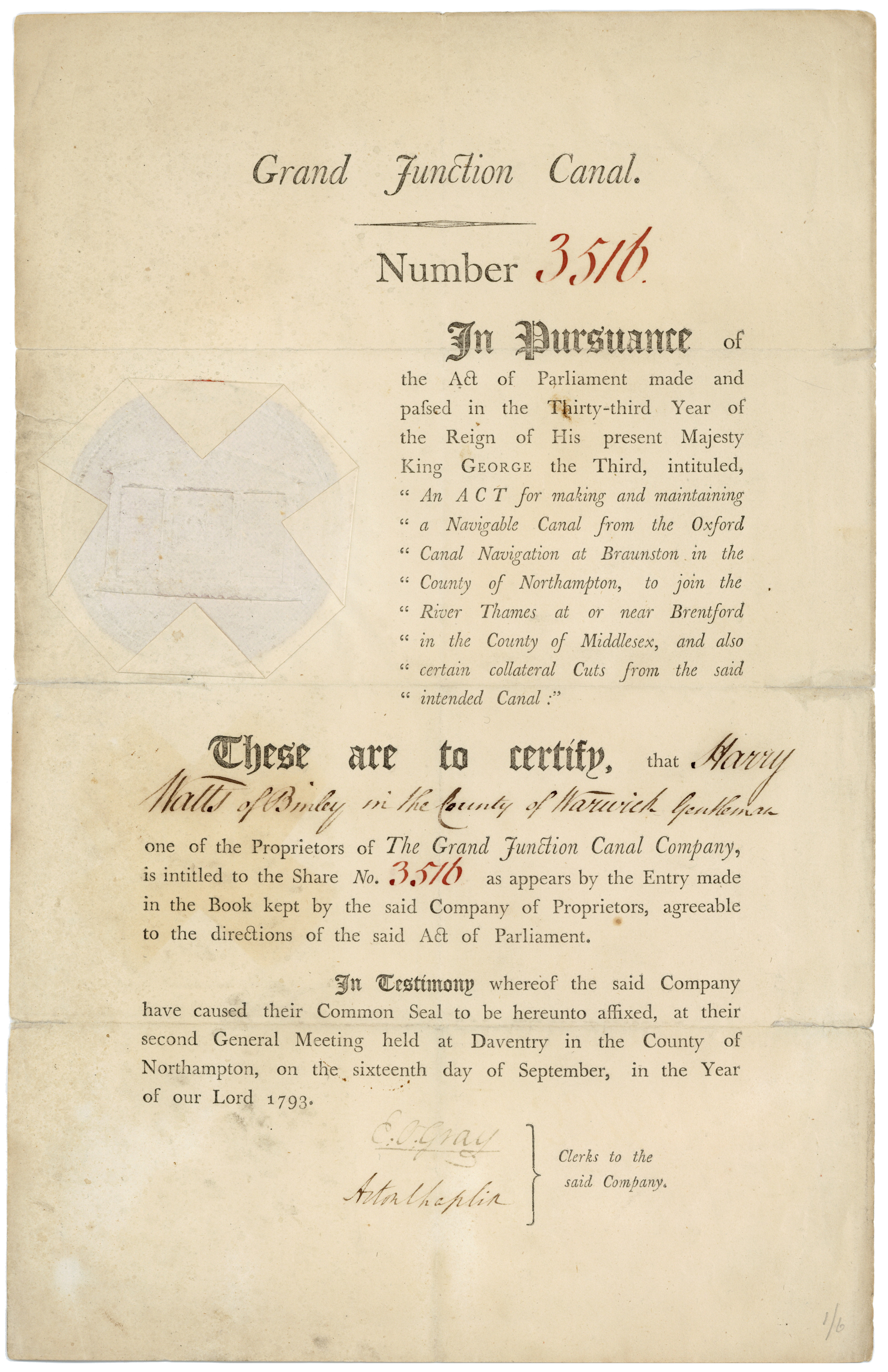
Founder's stock certificate of The Company of Proprietors of the Grand Junction Canal for one Share, issued in Daventry on 16 September 1793. William Praed became the first chairman of the canal company.

The Grand Junction Canal Act 1793 authorised the company to raise up to £600,000 to fund construction of the main line from where the eastern branch of the River Brent enters the Thames adjoining Syon Park in the parish of Brentford, to the Oxford Canal at Braunston. It also authorised branches to Daventry, the River Nene at Northampton, to the turnpike road (now the A5) at Old Stratford, and to Watford: those to Daventry and Watford were not built.

William Jessop was appointed to take charge of construction which started almost immediately from both ends. On 3 June 1793 an engineer, James Barnes, was appointed at the rate of two guineas (£2 2s) per day plus half a guinea (10s 6d) expenses.

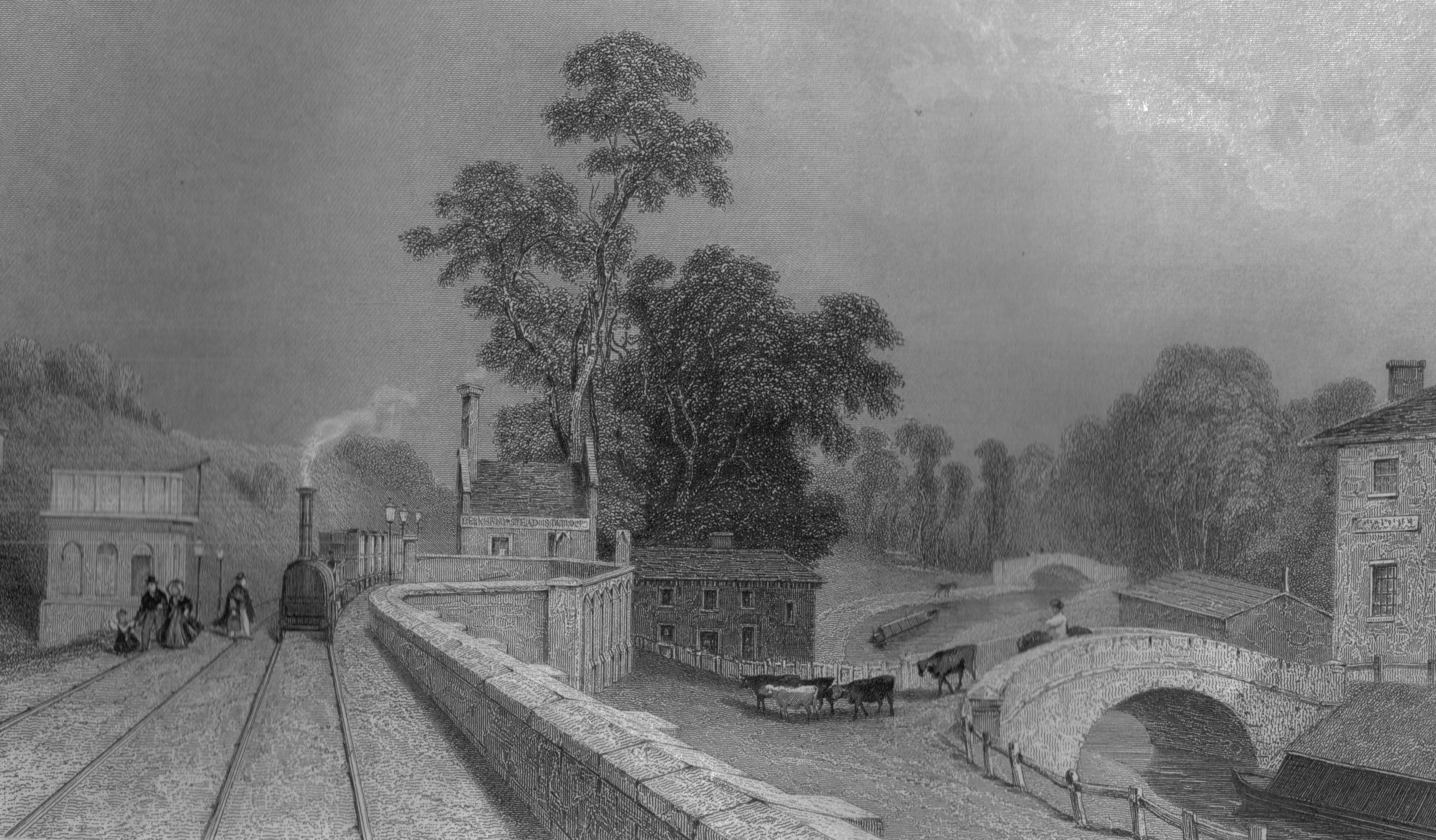
Berkhamsted station on the London and Birmingham Railway with the Grand Junction Canal on the right-hand side.

At the north end, there were problems with the construction of Blisworth Tunnel: quicksand was encountered, and errors made in alignment which meant that the tunnel had a pronounced wiggle. With the opening of Braunston Tunnel, the line was open from the Oxford Canal through to Weedon Bec in June 1796. However, Blisworth Tunnel continued to cause problems, collapsing in January 1796. The canal was opened from Braunston to Blisworth in 1797. The canal from the Thames reached Two Waters near Hemel Hempstead in 1798, Bulbourne at the north end of the Tring summit in 1799, and Stoke Bruerne at the south end of Blisworth Tunnel the following year.

Thus, with the exception of Blisworth Tunnel, the main line was fully open in 1800. To allow goods to cross the gap, a road was built in 1800 over the top of Blisworth hill and, later, upon the recommendation of committee member Joseph Wilkes, Benjamin Outram was contracted to build a tramway over the hill.

James Barnes proposed that work begin again on the tunnel on a new line. Robert Whitworth and John Rennie were called in for advice, and supported this proposal. However, construction on the new line did not start until June 1802, and was not completed until March 1805.

Initially, nine locks were used in a temporary arrangement to lower and raise the canal for the crossing of the River Great Ouse at Wolverton at the river's water level. In 1799, William Jessop designed a three-arch masonry aqueduct and embankment to cross the river and replace the locks. This collapsed in 1808, and a wooden trough was used as a temporary replacement. It was decided to build an iron aqueduct, with Benjamin Bevan as engineer. The foundation stone for the replacement aqueduct was laid on 9 September 1809, and it was opened on 22 January 1811.

The Grand Junction Canal had reduced the distance to London from the Midlands by 60 miles (100 km)—via Oxford and the River Thames—and made the journey reliable. As a result, it thrived: in 1810 it carried 343,560 tons of goods through London, with roughly equal amounts into and out of the capital.

=== The branches ===
The Grand Junction's original act, the Grand Junction Canal Act 1793 (33 Geo. 3. c. 80), authorised branches to Daventry, the River Nene at Northampton, to the turnpike road at Old Stratford (north-west of the modern Milton Keynes), and to Watford in Hertfordshire: those to Daventry and Watford were not built. The branch to Old Stratford was amended before it was built (see below). The branch to Northampton was delayed as the plans of the Leicestershire and Northamptonshire Union Canal to reach Northampton and thus join with the Grand Junction came to nothing. The link to Northampton was made by a tramroad transferred from Blisworth Tunnel, with the 5-mile (8 km) canal from Gayton being opened in 1815. The link to Leicester was eventually achieved by the opening of the Grand Union Canal, which took a more direct route from Foxton in Leicestershire to the Grand Junction at Norton Junction.

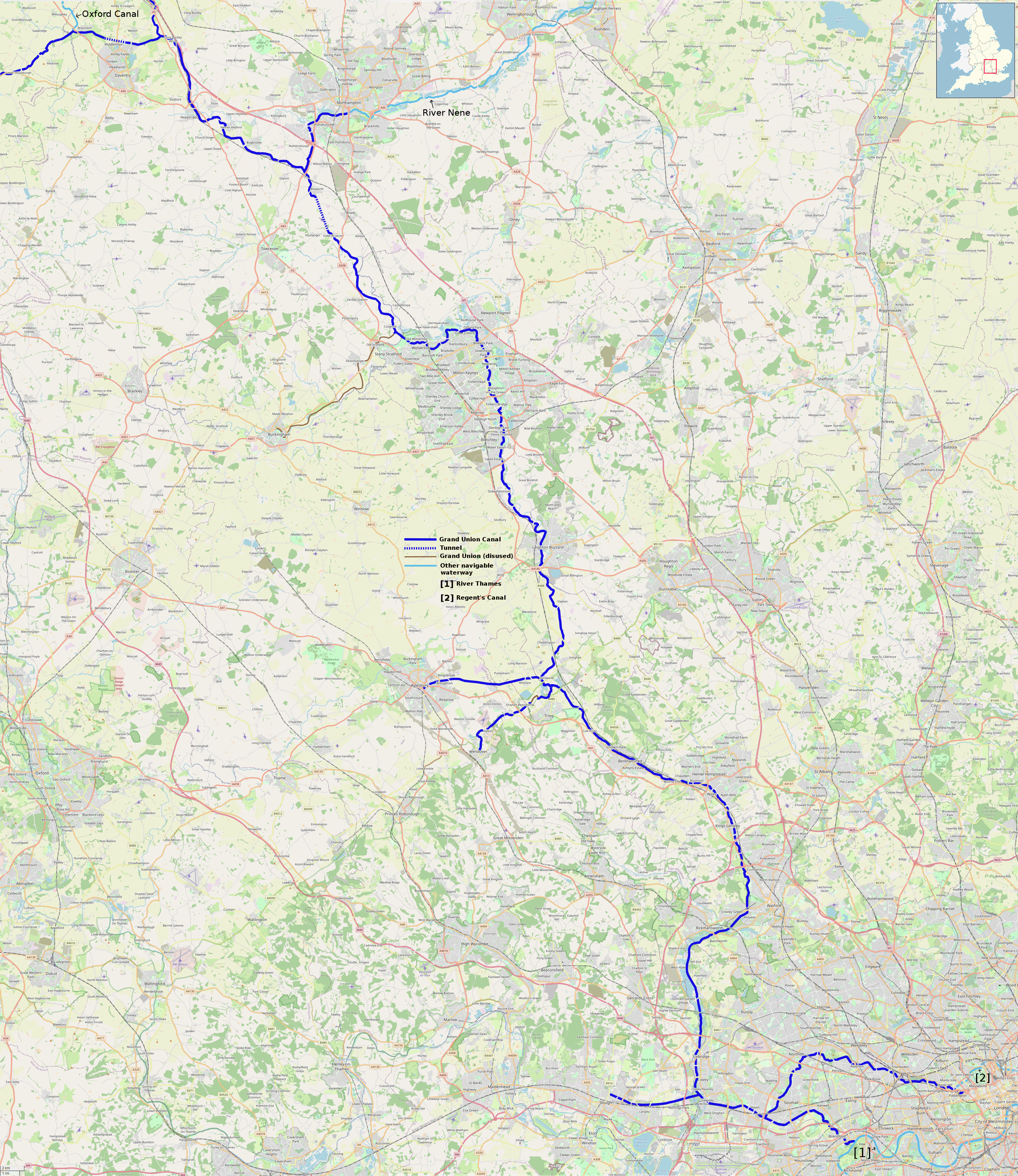
Geographic map of the route of the canal and its branches

The Grand Junction Canal Act 1794 (34 Geo. 3. c. 24) authorised three further branches, to Aylesbury, Buckingham, and Wendover. The 6 1/2-mile (10 km) navigable feeder from Wendover to the summit level at Tring was opened in 1799, while the 10 1/2-mile (17 km) Buckingham branch, an extension of the original proposal for a link to the main road at Old Stratford, was opened in 1801: both eventually fell into disuse, though the Wendover Arm is undergoing active restoration, and part of it is again navigable. The Aylesbury arm was envisaged to become a through route to the Thames and thus to the Wilts and Berks Canal and the Kennet and Avon Canal, but the 6-mile (10-kilometre) branch into the town, opened in 1815, was never extended.

The Grand Junction Canal (No. 2) Act 1795 (35 Geo. 3. c. 43) authorised a 13 1/2-mile (22 km) branch to Paddington from Bull's Bridge near Hayes: this was completed in 1801 and, with its large basin at Paddington and many wharfs along its length, it became an important trade route, even more so with the subsequent opening of the Regent's Canal. This branch also acted as a source of water from the River Brent.

The Grand Junction Canal (No. 3) Act 1795 (35 Geo. 3. c. 85) authorised a branch to St Albans: this was not built.

The last branch to be authorised and built was the 5-mile (8 km) route to Slough, opened in 1882.

=== Acts of Parliament ===
Grand Junction Canal Act 1793 (Note: Section 1(2) of the Grand Union Canal Act 1943 (6 & 7 Geo. 6. c. v).)
- Act of Parliament
- Parliament of Great Britain
- Long title: An Act for making and maintaining a navigable Canal from the Oxford Canal Navigation at Braunston, in the county of Northampton, to join the River Thames at or near Brentford, in the county of Middlesex; and also certain collateral Cuts from the said intended Canal.
- Citation: 33 Geo. 3. c. 80
- Territorial extent: Great Britain

Dates
- Royal assent: 30 April 1793
- Commencement: 30 April 1793 (Note: The Acts of Parliament (Commencement) Act 1793.)
Other legislation
Amended by	Grand Junction Canal Act 1794; Grand Junction Canal Act 1798; Grand Junction Canal Act 1805; Grand Junction Canal Act 1812; Grand Junction Canal Act 1818; Regent's Canal Water Act 1819; Grand Junction Waterworks Company Act 1835; Grand Union Canal Act 1943
Relates to	Grand Junction Canal (No. 1) Act 1795

Status: Amended

Text of statute as originally enacted

- Grand Junction Canal Act 1793 (33 Geo. 3. c. 80), received royal assent on 30 April 1793

An Act for making and maintaining a navigable Canal from the Oxford Canal Navigation at Braunston, in the county of Northampton, to join the River Thames at or near Brentford, in the county of Middlesex; and also certain collateral Cuts from the said intended Canal.

Grand Junction Canal Act 1794
- Act of Parliament
- Parliament of Great Britain
- Long title: An Act for making certain navigable Cuts from the towns of Buckingham, Aylesbury, and Wendover, in the county of Buckingham, to communicate with the Grand Junction Navigation authorised to be made by an Act of the last Session of Parliament, and for amending the said Act.
- Citation: 34 Geo. 3. c. 24
- Territorial extent: Great Britain

Dates
- Royal assent: 28 March 1794
- Commencement: 28 March 1794
Other legislation
Amends	Grand Junction Canal Act 1793
Amended by	Grand Union Canal Act 1943

Status: Amended

Text of statute as originally enacted

- Grand Junction Canal Act 1794 (34 Geo. 3. c. 24), received royal assent on 28 March 1794

An Act for making certain navigable Cuts from the towns of Buckingham, Aylesbury, and Wendover, in the county of Buckingham, to communicate with the Grand Junction Navigation authorised to be made by an Act of the last Session of Parliament, and for amending the said Act.

Grand Junction Canal (No. 1) Act 1795
- Act of Parliament
- Parliament of Great Britain
- Long title: An Act for authorising the Company of the Grand Junction Canal to vary the Course of a certain Part of the said Canal, in the county of Hertford, so as to render the Navigation thereof more safe and convenient, and for making some other Amendments and Alterations in an Act made in the Thirty-third Year of the Reign of his present Majesty, for making the said Canal.
- Citation: 35 Geo. 3. c. 8
- Territorial extent: Great Britain

Dates
- Royal assent: 5 March 1795
- Commencement: 5 March 1795
Other legislation
Amended by	Grand Junction Canal Act 1818; Grand Union Canal Act 1943
Relates to	Grand Junction Canal Act 1793

Status: Amended

Text of statute as originally enacted

- Grand Junction Canal (No. 1) Act 1795 (35 Geo. 3. c. 8), received royal assent on 5 March 1795

An Act for authorising the Company of the Grand Junction Canal to vary the Course of a certain Part of the said Canal, in the county of Hertford, so as to render the Navigation thereof more safe and convenient, and for making some other Amendments and Alterations in an Act made in the Thirty-third Year of the Reign of his present Majesty, for making the said Canal.

Grand Junction Canal (No. 2) Act 1795
- Act of Parliament
- Parliament of Great Britain
- Long title: An Act for making a navigable Cut from the Grand Junction Canal, in the precinct of Norwood, in the county of Middlesex, to Paddington, in the said county.
- Citation: 35 Geo. 3. c. 43
- Territorial extent: Great Britain

Dates
- Royal assent: 28 April 1795
- Commencement: 28 April 1795
Other legislation
Amended by	Grand Junction Canal Act 1818; Grand Junction Waterworks Company Act 1835; Grand Union Canal Act 1943

Status: Amended

Text of statute as originally enacted

- Grand Junction Canal (No. 2) Act 1795 (35 Geo. 3. c. 43), received royal assent on 28 April 1795

An Act for making a navigable Cut from the Grand Junction Canal, in the precinct of Norwood, in the county of Middlesex, to Paddington, in the said county.

Grand Junction Canal (No. 3) Act 1795
- Act of Parliament
- Parliament of Great Britain
- Long title: An Act for making and extending a navigable Cut from the town of Watford, in the county of Hertford, to the town of St. Alban, in the same county.
- Citation: 35 Geo. 3. c. 85
- Territorial extent: Great Britain

Dates
- Royal assent: 2 June 1795
- Commencement: 2 June 1795
Other legislation
Amended by	Grand Union Canal Act 1943

Status: Amended

Text of statute as originally enacted

- Grand Junction Canal (No. 3) Act 1795 (35 Geo. 3. c. 85), received royal assent on 2 June 1795

An Act for making and extending a navigable Cut from the town of Watford, in the county of Hertford, to the town of St. Alban, in the same county.

Grand Junction Canal (No. 4) Act 1795
- Act of Parliament
- Parliament of Great Britain
- Long title: An Act to enable the Company of Proprietors of the Grand Junction Canal to finish and complete the same, and the several Cuts and other Works authorised to be made and done by them, by virtue of several Acts of Parliament.
- Citation: 36 Geo. 3. c. 25
- Territorial extent: Great Britain

Dates
- Royal assent: 24 December 1795
- Commencement: 24 December 1795
Other legislation
Amended by	Grand Union Canal Act 1943

Status: Amended

Text of statute as originally enacted

- Grand Junction Canal (No. 4) Act 1795 (36 Geo. 3. c. 25), received royal assent on 24 December 1795

An Act to enable the Company of Proprietors of the Grand Junction Canal to finish and complete the same, and the several Cuts and other Works authorised to be made and done by them, by virtue of several Acts of Parliament.

Grand Junction Canal Act 1798
- Act of Parliament
- Parliament of Great Britain
- Long title: An Act for confirming and carrying into Execution certain Articles of Agreement made and entered into between Beilby, Lord Bishop of London, Thomas Wood, Esq. Sir John Frederick, Bart. and Arthur Stanhope, Esq. Sir John Morshead, Bart. and Dame Elizabeth his wife, and Robert Thistlethwaite, Esq. and Selina his wife, and the Company of Proprietors of the Grand Junction Canal; and for other Purposes therein-mentioned.
- Citation: 38 Geo. 3. c. xxxiii
- Territorial extent: Great Britain

Dates
- Royal assent: 26 May 1798
- Commencement: 26 May 1798
Other legislation
Amends	Grand Junction Canal Act 1793
Amended by	Worcester and Birmingham Canal Act 1804; Sir John Frederick's, &c. Estate Act 1824; Grand Junction Waterworks Company Act 1835; Grand Junction Waterworks Act 1856; Grand Union Canal Act 1943
Relates to	Bishop of London's Estate Act 1844

Status: Amended

Text of statute as originally enacted

- Grand Junction Canal Act 1798 (38 Geo. 3. c. xxxiii), received royal assent on 26 May 1798

An Act for confirming and carrying into Execution certain Articles of Agreement made and entered into between Beilby, Lord Bishop of London, Thomas Wood, Esq. Sir John Frederick, Bart. and Arthur Stanhope, Esq. Sir John Morshead, Bart. and Dame Elizabeth his wife, and Robert Thistlethwaite, Esq. and Selina his wife, and the Company of Proprietors of the Grand Junction Canal; and for other Purposes therein-mentioned.

Grand Junction Canal Act 1801
- Act of Parliament
- Parliament of the United Kingdom
- Long title: An Act for enabling the Company of Proprietors of the Grand Junction Canal more effectually to provide for the Discharge of their Debts, and to complete the whole of the Works to be executed by them, in pursuance of the several Acts of the Thirty-third, Thirty-fourth, Thirty-fifth, Thirty-sixth, and Thirty-eighth Years of the Reign of his present Majesty; and for altering and enlarging the Powers and Provisions of the said Acts.
- Citation: 41 Geo. 3. (U.K.) c. lxxi
- Territorial extent: United Kingdom

Dates
- Royal assent: 20 June 1801
- Commencement: 20 June 1801
Other legislation
Amended by	Grand Union Canal Act 1943

Status: Amended

Text of statute as originally enacted

- Grand Junction Canal Act 1801 (41 Geo. 3. (U.K.) c. lxxi), received royal assent on 20 June 1801

An Act for enabling the Company of Proprietors of the Grand Junction Canal more effectually to provide for the Discharge of their Debts, and to complete the whole of the Works to be executed by them, in pursuance of the several Acts of the Thirty-third, Thirty-fourth, Thirty-fifth, Thirty-sixth, and Thirty-eighth Years of the Reign of his present Majesty; and for altering and enlarging the Powers and Provisions of the said Acts.

Grand Junction Canal Act 1803
- Act of Parliament
- Parliament of the United Kingdom
- Long title: An Act for empowering the Company of Proprietors of the Grand Junction Canal, to raise a further Sum of Money to enable them to complete the Works authorised to be executed, in pursuance of the several Acts passed in the Thirty-third, Thirty-fourth, Thirty-fifth, Thirty-sixth, Thirty-eighth, and Forty-first Years of the Reign of his present Majesty; and for amending, altering, and enlarging the Powers and Provisions of the said Acts.
- Citation: 43 Geo. 3. c. viii
- Territorial extent: United Kingdom

Dates
- Royal assent: 24 March 1803
- Commencement: 24 March 1803
Other legislation
Amended by	Grand Union Canal Act 1943

Status: Amended

- Grand Junction Canal Act 1803 (43 Geo. 3. c. viii), received royal assent on 24 March 1803

An Act for empowering the Company of Proprietors of the Grand Junction Canal, to raise a further Sum of Money to enable them to complete the Works authorised to be executed, in pursuance of the several Acts passed in the Thirty-third, Thirty-fourth, Thirty-fifth, Thirty-sixth, Thirty-eighth, and Forty-first Years of the Reign of his present Majesty; and for amending, altering, and enlarging the Powers and Provisions of the said Acts.

Grand Junction Canal Act 1805
- Act of Parliament
- Parliament of the United Kingdom
- Long title: An Act for altering, amending, and enlarging the Powers of certain Acts for making and maintaining the Grand Junction Canal.
- Citation: 45 Geo. 3. c. lxviii
- Territorial extent: United Kingdom

Dates
- Royal assent: 27 June 1805
- Commencement: 27 June 1805
Other legislation
Amends	Grand Junction Canal Act 1793

Status: Current legislation

- Grand Junction Canal Act 1805 (45 Geo. 3. c. lxviii), received royal assent on 27 June 1805

An Act for altering, amending, and enlarging the Powers of certain Acts for making and maintaining the Grand Junction Canal.

Grand Junction Canal Act 1812
- Act of Parliament
- Parliament of the United Kingdom
- Long title: An Act to explain, amend, and enlarge the Powers of certain Acts passed for making and maintaining the Grand Junction Canal.
- Citation: 52 Geo. 3. c. cxl
- Territorial extent: United Kingdom

Dates
- Royal assent: 9 June 1812
- Commencement: 9 June 1812
Other legislation
Amends	Grand Junction Canal Act 1793
Relates to	Grand Junction Canal Act 1818; Regent's Canal Water Act 1819; Grand Union Canal Act 1943

Status: Amended

Text of statute as originally enacted

- Grand Junction Canal Act 1812 (52 Geo. 3. c. cxl), received royal assent on 9 June 1812

An Act to explain, amend, and enlarge the Powers of certain Acts passed for making and maintaining the Grand Junction Canal.

Grand Junction Canal Act 1818
- Act of Parliament
- Parliament of the United Kingdom
- Long title: An Act to enable the Grand Junction Canal Company to vary the Line of Part of their Canal in the county of Hertford, and for altering and enlarging the Powers of several Acts relating to the said Canal.
- Citation: 58 Geo. 3. c. xvi
- Territorial extent: United Kingdom

Dates
- Royal assent: 17 March 1818
- Commencement: 17 March 1818
Other legislation
Amends	Grand Junction Canal Act 1793; Grand Junction Canal (No. 1) Act 1795; Grand Junction Canal (No. 2) Act 1795
Amended by	Grand Union Canal Act 1943
Relates to	Grand Junction Canal Act 1812

Status: Amended

Text of statute as originally enacted

- Grand Junction Canal Act 1818 (58 Geo. 3. c. xvi), received royal assent on 17 March 1818

An Act to enable the Grand Junction Canal Company to vary the Line of Part of their Canal in the county of Hertford, and for altering and enlarging the Powers of several Acts relating to the said Canal.

Regent's Canal Water Act 1819
- Act of Parliament
- Parliament of the United Kingdom
- Long title: An Act to vary and alter certain Acts of his present Majesty, relating to the Grand Junction Canal, the Grand Junction Water Works, and the Regent's Canal, in order to effect an Exchange of Water, for the better Supply of the Regent's Canal Navigation and Grand Junction Water Works.
- Citation: 59 Geo. 3. c. cxi
- Territorial extent: United Kingdom

Dates
- Royal assent: 22 June 1819
- Commencement: 22 June 1819
Other legislation
Amends	Grand Junction Canal Act 1793
Amended by	Regent's Canal (Limehouse Basin) Act 1865; Regent's Canal and Dock Act 1875; Grand Union Canal Act 1943
Relates to	Grand Junction Canal Act 1812; British Transport Commission Act 1962

Text of statute as originally enacted

- Regent's Canal (Water) Act 1819 (59 Geo. 3. c. cxi), received royal assent on 22 June 1819

An Act to vary and alter certain Acts of his present Majesty, relating to the Grand Junction Canal, the Grand Junction Water Works, and the Regent's Canal, in order to effect an Exchange of Water, for the better Supply of the Regent's Canal Navigation and Grand Junction Water Works.

Grand Junction Canal Act 1879
- Act of Parliament
- Parliament of the United Kingdom
- Long title: An Act for authorising the Company of Proprietors of the Grand Junction Canal to make a Branch Canal to Slough; and for other purposes.
- Citation: 42 & 43 Vict. c. clxxviii
- Territorial extent: United Kingdom

Dates
- Royal assent: 21 July 1879
- Commencement: 21 July 1879
Other legislation
Amended by	Grand Union Canal Act 1943

Status: Amended

Text of statute as originally enacted

- Grand Junction Canal Act 1879 (42 & 43 Vict. c. clxxviii), received royal assent on 21 July 1879

An Act for authorising the Company of Proprietors of the Grand Junction Canal to make a Branch Canal to Slough; and for other purposes.

Regent's Canal and Dock Company (Grand Junction Canal Purchase) Act 1928
- Act of Parliament
- Parliament of the United Kingdom
- Long title: An Act to provide for the transfer to the Regent's Canal and Dock Company of the canal undertaking of the Company of Proprietors of the Grand Junction Canal to confer various powers upon the Regent's Canal and Dock Company and for other purposes.
- Citation: 18 & 19 Geo. 5. c. xcviii
- Territorial extent: United Kingdom

Dates
- Royal assent: 3 August 1928
- Commencement: 3 August 1928
Other legislation
Amended by	Grand Union Canal Act 1931; Grand Union Canal Act 1943; National Insurance (Modification of Transport Undertaking Superannuation Funds) Regulation 1961

Status: Amended

Text of statute as originally enacted

- Regent's Canal and Dock Company (Grand Junction Canal Purchase) Act 1928 (18 & 19 Geo. 5. c. xcviii), received royal assent on 3 August 1928.

An Act to provide for the transfer to the Regent's Canal and Dock Company of the canal undertaking of the Company of Proprietors of the Grand Junction Canal to confer various powers upon the Regent's Canal and Dock Company and for other purposes.

=== Further development ===
A clause under their acts allowed the Grand Junction Canal to supply drinking water. Accordingly, the Grand Junction Waterworks Company was established in 1811, initially taking water from the River Colne, the River Brent and a reservoir in North West Middlesex now known as Ruislip Lido. These waters proved unsatisfactory and the company transferred its inlets to the River Thames.

The importance of trade between London and the Midlands meant that railway competition was an early threat to this canal compared with others in the country. John Rennie undertook a survey in 1824 for a London to Birmingham railway.

There were also ambitious proposals for new canals. In 1827 there was a proposal for a London and Birmingham Junction Canal from the Stratford-upon-Avon Canal to Braunston. In 1832, William Cubitt proposed a Central Union Canal from the Worcester and Birmingham Canal near Worcester Bar via Solihull to the Oxford at Ansty, while in 1833 there were proposals for a London and Birmingham Canal, from Stratford direct to the Regent's Canal, which would bypass the Grand Junction Canal entirely. This, together with the railway threats, spurred the Grand Junction into making improvements.

The London and Birmingham Railway was completed in 1838 and, with the exception of the Oxford Canal, the canals on the route from London to Birmingham co-operated to reduce tolls to compete with the railway. As a result, there was an increase in traffic, but income was significantly reduced.

To cope with the traffic volumes, the locks at Stoke Bruerne were duplicated in 1835, and new larger reservoirs built at Tring to ease a serious water shortage. In 1848 the Grand Junction entered the carrying trade, pitting its boats directly against the railway competition. From 1864, steam narrow boats were acquired, working with a butty, and these penetrated as far as the Erewash Canal. Carrying was given up in 1876 because it did not pay.

By 1871 the tunnels at Braunston and Blisworth were becoming bottlenecks and steam tugs were provided to tow strings of waiting boats through.

Leicestershire and Northamptonshire Union and Grand Union Canals (Transfer) Act 1894
- Act of Parliament
- Parliament of the United Kingdom
- Long title: An Act to authorise the transfer of the Leicestershire and Northamptonshire Union Canal and of the Grand Union Canal to the Company of Proprietors of the Grand Junction Canal and for other purposes.
- Citation: 57 & 58 Vict. c. lxxxv
- Territorial extent: United Kingdom

Dates
- Royal assent: 20 July 1894
- Commencement: 20 July 1894
Other legislation
Amended by	Grand Union Canal Act 1943

Status: Amended

Text of statute as originally enacted

Under the encouragement of major carriers Fellows Morton & Clayton, the Grand Junction bought the (old) Grand Union Canal and the Leicestershire and Northamptonshire Union Canal under the Leicestershire and Northamptonshire Union and Grand Union Canals (Transfer) Act 1894 (57 & 58 Vict. c. lxxxv) and worked with other navigations to encourage more through traffic to London: the Grand Junction was concerned that through traffic was being deterred by the poor condition and high tolls of the railway-owned Cromford Canal and Nottingham Canal.

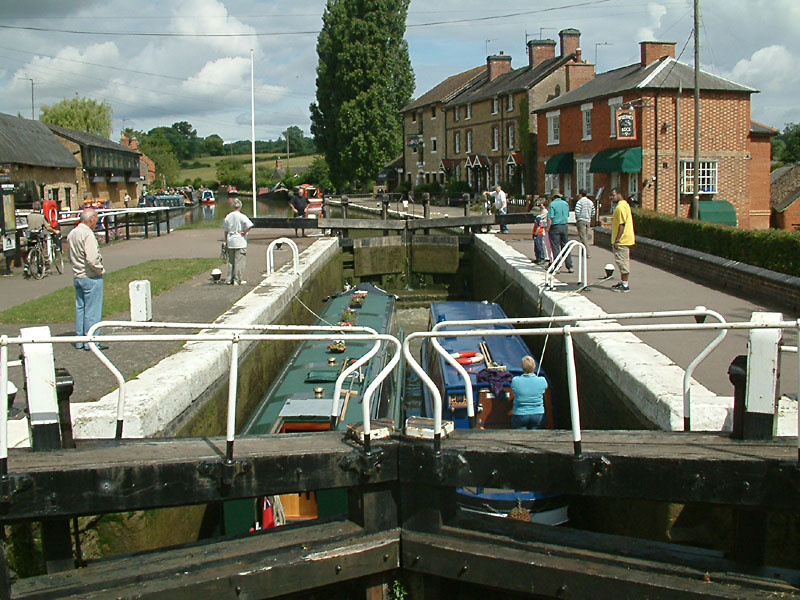
Top lock at Stoke Bruerne

An inclined plane was opened at Foxton Locks in 1900, as part of a plan to enable wide barges to use the Grand Union Canal and thus bring more traffic on to the main line of the Grand Junction from the east Midlands. Widening of the locks at Watford was also planned, but not carried through. Consideration was given to constructing other inclined planes as part of a plan to enlarge the canals to carry 80-ton barges, but no more were built.

With ever more traffic going by rail, the canal's only significant weapon was low tolls. While this slowed the decline in volumes, it did so only by large reductions in income, and consideration was given to amalgamations with other canals.

Concerns began to develop about the state of repair of the canal via Warwick to Birmingham, on which the Grand Junction was reliant for a through route. In 1925, discussions began with the three Warwick canals and the Regent's Canal, and in 1926 a merger was agreed. The Regent's Canal bought the Grand Junction Canal and the three Warwick canals, and from 1 January 1929 they became part of the (new) Grand Union Canal.

== See also ==
- Canals of Great Britain
- History of the British canal system
