= Wendover Arm Canal =

Canal in England

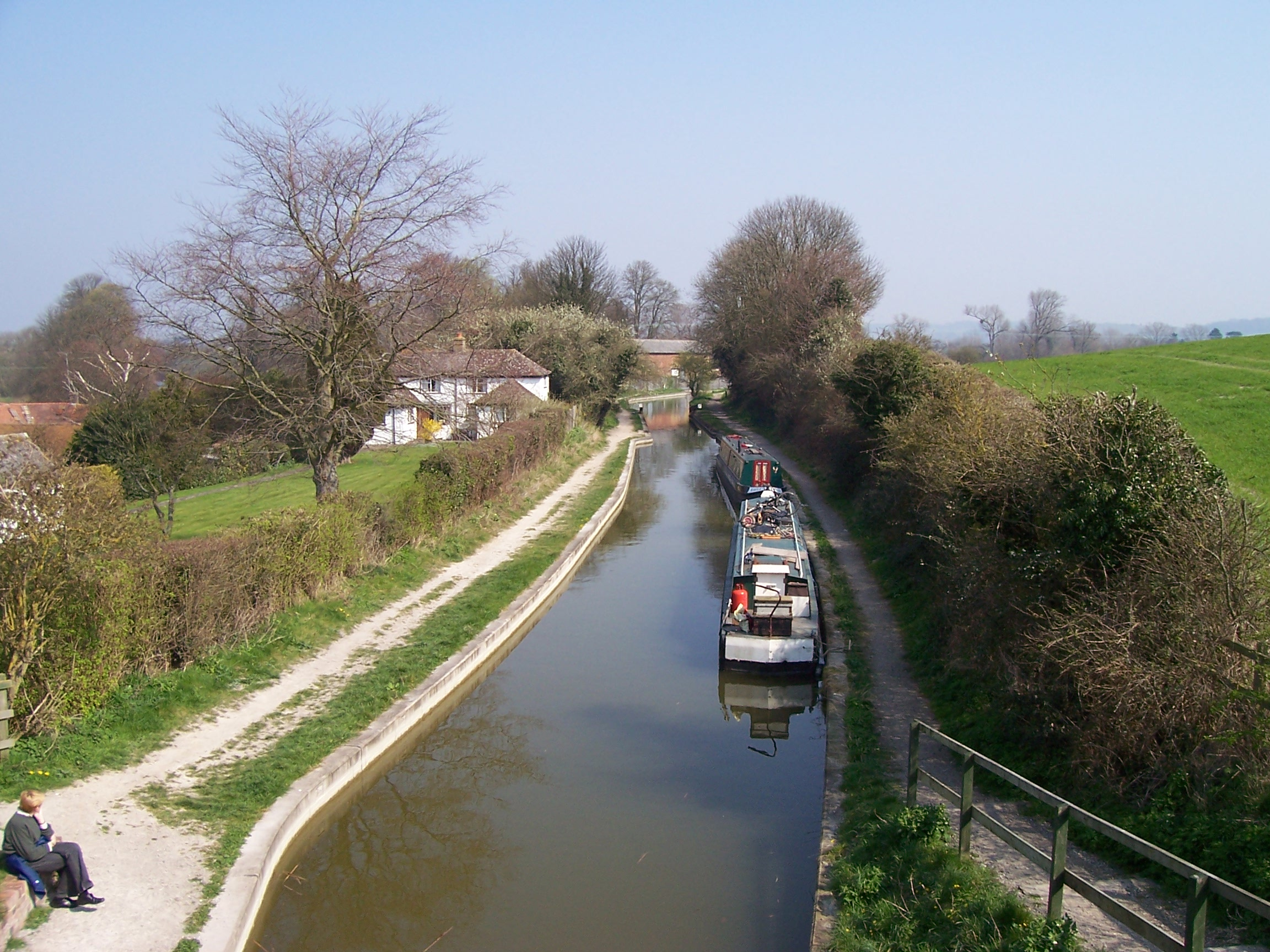
- The Stop Lock to Little Tring Bridge

Specifications
- Status: Part restored

History
- Original owner: Grand Junction Canal Co
- Date of act: 1794
- Date completed: 1799
- Date closed: 1897

Geography
- Start point: Wendover
- End point: Bulbourne
- Branch of: Grand Union Canal

The Wendover Arm Canal is part of the Grand Union Canal in England, and forms part of the British canal system. It is usually known as the Wendover Canal, but historically its builders referred to their branch canals as arms, hence its historical name of Wendover Arm. It was planned as a feeder to carry water from springs near the town of Wendover in Buckinghamshire to the main line of the Grand Junction Canal at Bulbourne near Startops End in Hertfordshire, but when it opened in 1799 it was made navigable, as the extra cost of making it was so small. Water supplies from Wendover were found to be inadequate, and a series of reservoirs were built. A pumping station at Whitehouses was superseded by the Tringford pumping station in 1817; its steam engines were replaced by diesel engines in 1911 and then by electric pumps.

The canal was used for the carriage of coal to three gasworks, and for transport of straw to London and horse manure in the opposite direction. It was also used by the Heygates flour mill, and Bushell's built boats on its banks. Despite several attempts to rectify leakage, including one of the earliest uses of asphalt for this purpose, no satisfactory solution was found, and most of the 6.7-mile (11 km) canal ceased to be used for navigation in 1904. Water levels in the upper section were lowered, and a pipeline was constructed along part of the bed, so that water could still be supplied to Tring summit.

The canal became part of the Grand Union Canal in 1929, and responsibility passed to British Waterways in 1963. Initial attempts to reopen the canal following the formation of the Grand Union Canal Society in 1967 were unsuccessful. But interest revived in 1985, the Wendover Arm Trust was formed in 1989, and in 1990 the Department of Transport agreed to build a navigable culvert where the new Aston Clinton bypass would cross the arm. The Trust split the task of reopening the canal into three phases, and phase 1 of the project, the first 1.3 miles (2 km) from the junction at Bulbourne to a winding hole near Little Tring Farm, was completed and reopened in 2005. Using Bentonite matting, they relined the section which leaked so badly and in 2009 the first 0.25 miles (0.40 km) of phase 2 were filled with water for the first time since 1904. Another section of a similar length was rewatered in 2015, and a bid made for Heritage Lottery Funding to speed the completion of phase 2. This was subsequently withdrawn, when it was found that parts of the canal had been filled with noxious material, rather than domestic rubbish, but grants were received in 2022 to enable all the contaminated material to be removed.

== History ==
When James Barnes was planning the route for the Grand Junction Canal, he was faced with the problem of crossing the Chiltern Hills. Since ancient times, roads had passed through the Tring Gap, a low saddle in the hills near Tring, and Barnes opted for this route. The main line of the canal was authorised by an Act of Parliament obtained in 1793. A second Act was obtained on 28 March 1794, which authorised the construction of branches to Buckingham, Aylesbury, and Wendover. On its journey through the Chilterns, the main line reaches a height of 390 feet (120 m) at Tring summit. From the south, it ascends through a series of locks which follow the valleys of the rivers Gade and Bulbourne to reach Cowroast Lock. After a relatively short 3-mile (4.8 km) summit, the canal starts its descent at Bulbourne, picking up the valley of the River Ouzel.

Each boat crossing the summit level draws off nearly 200,000 imperial gallons (910 m^{3}) of water; Barnes knew that local water supplies would not be sufficient to sustain this. Wendover is located on the north-facing escarpment of the Chiltern Hills, with a chalk aquifer feeding natural springs which could supply water all year round, and so the Wendover branch was conceived as a non-navigable feeder, to carry water from the springs and streams in the area to the Tringford reservoirs which fed the Tring summit. However, the cost of widening it was small, and so it was always a navigable channel from the time of its completion in 1799.

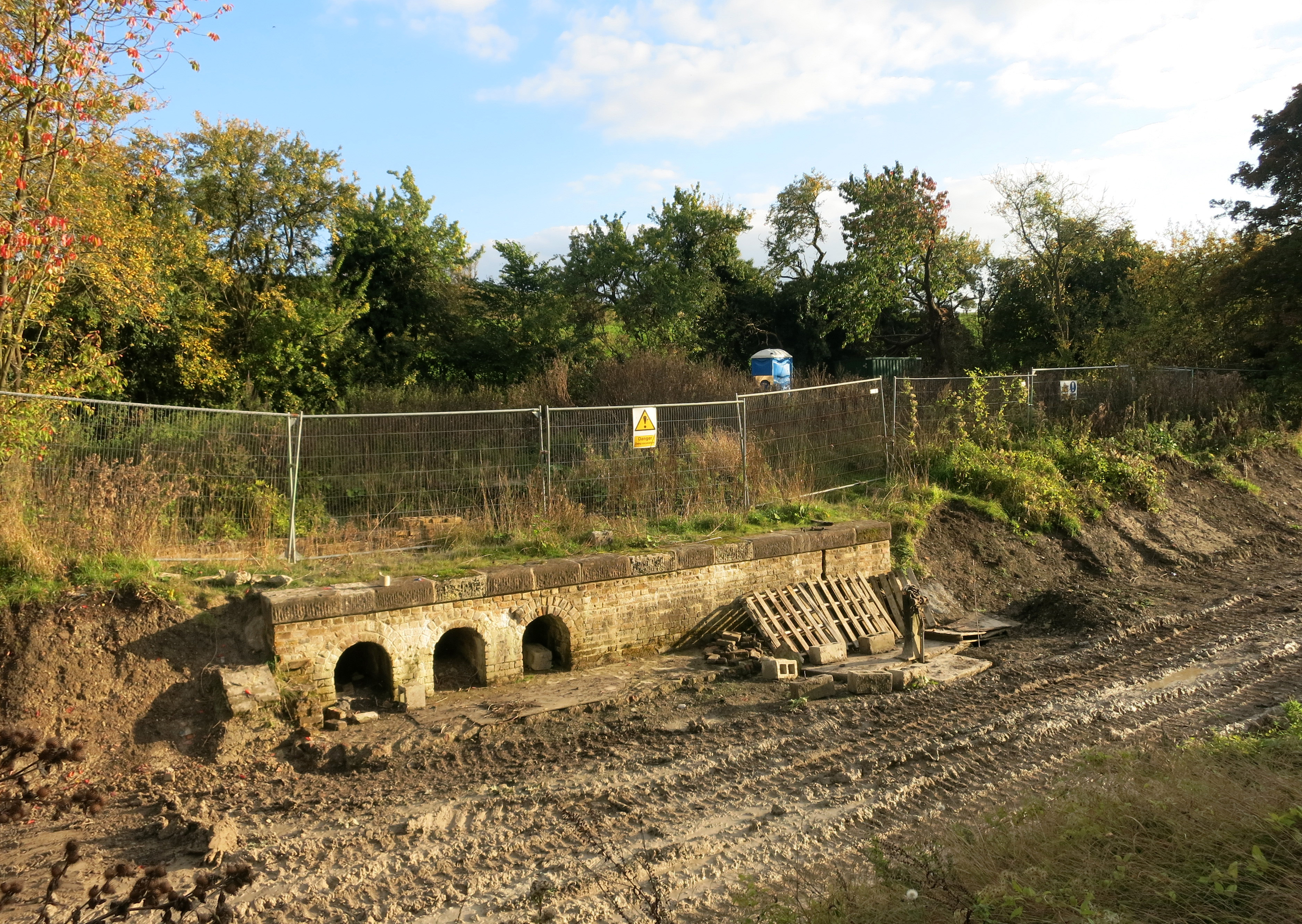
The remains of Whitehouses pumping station following excavation in 2015

The water supply was supplemented by mill streams, which were diverted into the canal after the company bought out mills at Wendover, Halton and Weston Turville. They also built Weston Turville reservoir in 1798, which was used to supply the mills in Aylesbury, whose water supply had been diverted into the canal. The reservoir was also used to replenish the canal and, as milling technology developed, this became its primary purpose. A steam pump was installed in 1814 which fed water to the canal through underground pipes. Although only installed as a temporary solution, it continued to operate until 1839.

It soon became clear that the supply of water from Wendover was insufficient, and in 1802 the first of four reservoirs was constructed. Wilstone reservoir was followed by Marsworth, completed in 1806, Tringford, completed in 1814 and Startops End, completed in 1815. The banks of Wilstone reservoir were raised in 1811 and 1827, and extensions in 1835 and 1839 increased its size four-fold. It now has a capacity of 242 million imperial gallons (1,102 Ml). There was a pumping station at Whitehouses, which pumped water from the reservoir into the canal. It housed a Newcomen engine which operated until around 1835, but the station was demolished when pumping was concentrated at Tringford.

Tringford pumping station was built in 1816 and 1817, and contained a Boulton and Watt beam engine. The cast-iron beam was 24 feet (7.3 m) long, and the single cylinder was 49.5 inches (126 cm) in diameter, with an 8-foot (2.4 m) stroke. A second steam engine was added when the station was extended between 1836 and 1838, after which Whitehouses was demolished. A building to house diesel engines was added in 1911, and the second steam engine was scrapped in 1913. Following removal of the beam engine in 1927, the height of the main engine house was reduced. The diesel engines were later superseded by electric pumps.

=== Operation ===
The canal was used for the carriage of coal, timber, straw and manure. Straw was shipped to London, for use as bedding for horses, and horse manure was transported in the opposite direction, from the bus depots of London, to be used as fertiliser on farms in the locality. Coal was delivered to Aston Clinton House from the canal, and to three gas works, which were located at Wendover, Halton and near Bucklandwharf bridge, which carries the old route of the A41 road over the canal. The coal came from the Midlands, and was used to produce gas for lighting. The Gas Works at Aston Clinton survived until 1964. In 1875, Heygates flour mill was built on the banks of the canal at Gamnel Bridge. It was powered by steam engines, for which the canal supplied the water. Grain was delivered by boat, and the processed flour was transported away by boat. After the end of the Second World War water transport was superseded by trucks, and in 2013 the mill operated a fleet of 16 trucks to deliver flour to markets in the south of England.

Next to the flour mill was a boat yard belonging to Bushell Brothers of Tring. There had been a boat repair business on the site from 1850, and Bushell's was established in 1875. As well as building and maintaining wooden boats for several small and medium-sized carrying companies operating on the canal network, they also trained a number of craftsmen who later held important positions at other boat building yards. The business closed in 1952. Very few original wooden boats survive, and only one built by Bushell's is known to exist. Roger was built in 1936 for Arthur Harvey-Taylor, a coal merchant and carrying company based at Aylesbury, and worked until 1968. After a period in use as a residential boat, and a period of dereliction, restoration was completed in 2000 by the Rickmansworth Waterways Trust, with help from the Heritage Lottery Fund. It is on the National Register of Historic Vessels. Other notable boats built at the yard and launched into the canal included a 72-by-14-foot (21.9 by 4.3 m) tug named Bess, built during the First World War, which was designed to pull ten 100-ton barges, and a 450-horsepower (340 kW) tug named Progress, which was the largest boat built by Bushell's. Tools and other objects used at Bushell Brothers, as well as various old tools that one of the Bushell brothers, who was always interested in rural crafts, collected during his retirement, were donated to the Museum of English Rural Life in 1963.

=== Decline ===
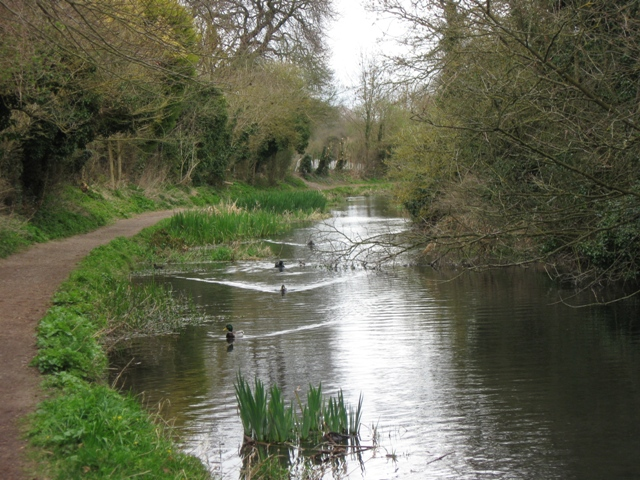
Disused section of the canal near Wendover

The Wendover Arm itself had a working life of 100 years. Part of its downfall was that some sections leaked. Much of it was repuddled within 10 years of its construction, to try to prevent some of the leakage. There is speculation that a section called The Narrows was lined with concrete and faced with bricks to prevent leakage into a large neighbouring property, Aston Clinton House, but this is unconfirmed. The company tried using asphalt to line the canal in 1857, but that failed after 13 years, due in part to inexperience in the use of the material. In 1897, which was drier than usual, the Grand Union company decided that the arm was leaking more water than it was supplying, and stop planks were used to block off the arm at Little Tring. The stop planks were replaced by a stop lock, which was operational by 1901.

By 1904 the canal company had decided to abandon the arm as a navigation. The top 4 miles (6.4 km) were again repuddled, the water level was lowered, and all of the water flowing along it was fed into Wilstone reservoir. This put an extra load on the pumps at Tringford, as the Wilstone reservoir is at a lower level than the Tringford one. A pipeline was therefore laid from a sump at Drayton Beauchamp to the Tring pumping station, along the bed of the disused canal, so that water arrived at the pumps at a higher level. The new system was still not satisfactory, due to the large variations in flow along the feeder, and it was redesigned in 1912. After reconstruction, the water was pumped directly into the main line, with surplus water flowing into Tringford reservoir. The section of canal between Wendover and Drayton Beauchamp remained in water, resembling a chalk stream. In 1917, German prisoners of war built a railway bridge over it near Wendover. The standard gauge railway line was used to remove timber from Wendover Woods, and also supplied Halton Camp, a base for the Royal Flying Corps, which subsequently became RAF Halton. The line was in use until 1963, and the bridge was demolished as a training exercise by sappers in 1965. A footbridge was subsequently erected in the same location.

The Wendover Canal, as part of the Grand Junction Canal, became part of the Grand Union Canal on 1 January 1929, when an agreement between the parent company and the Regents Canal was authorised by Act of Parliament. Following nationalisation in 1948, responsibility for the canal passed to British Waterways in 1963 and then to the Canal & River Trust.

=== Revival ===
Interest in the arm was revived in 1967, when the Inland Waterways Association held a public meeting in Watford to debate the future of the Grand Union Canal. In February 1967 the Grand Union Canal Society was formed, and later began campaigns to reopen both the Slough Arm and the Wendover Arm. The initial plan failed due to a lack of local interest, and because the legal position was not sufficiently strong to mount a successful campaign.

In 1979 the Grand Union Canal Society was worried that nature conservation lobbying might lead to the arm being closed to boats completely, so it organised a campaign cruise to Little Tringford Pumping Station, the head of navigation at the time. By 1985 there was enough interest in reviving the arm that a separate Wendover Arm Group was formed, which included members from the Grand Union Canal Society, the Inland Waterways Association, the Aylesbury Canal Society and representatives from local boat clubs. They planned a two-stage project, involving first the section from Tringford Pumping Station to Aston Clinton, where the A41 road crossed, with a second stage covering the remainder of the route into Wendover. In 1986 the group published a report called Water to Wendover, to highlight its plans.

The Wendover Arm Trust was formed in 1989. In 1990, their position was strengthened when the Department of Transport announced that the Aston Clinton bypass would include diverting the canal so that a navigable culvert could be built where the new road would cross the arm. This led to the identification of the arm by the Inland Waterways Association as one of the ten restoration schemes most likely to benefit from its backing.

== Wendover Canal Trust ==
In February 1989 the Wendover Trust was formed as a charitable trust with the aim of restoring and promoting the canal. The organisation is also registered as a private company limited by guarantee with Companies House. The trust is funded primarily by donations (with some funding from British Waterways and from the Canal & River Trust). The major fund-raising activity was an annual canal festival which began in 1990; it was held at Tring, until 2009, after which the site ceased to be available. The Wendover Trust reached agreement with the Box Moor Trust in 2011 and the festival was relocated to Boxmoor, near Hemel Hempstead railway station, some 10 miles (16 km) south of the Wendover Canal on the Grand Union Canal, but then ceased. In 2021 the Wendover Arm Trust began using the operating name of Wendover Canal Trust, because this is more meaningful to those not familiar with the historic use of the word "Arm".

=== Phase 1 ===
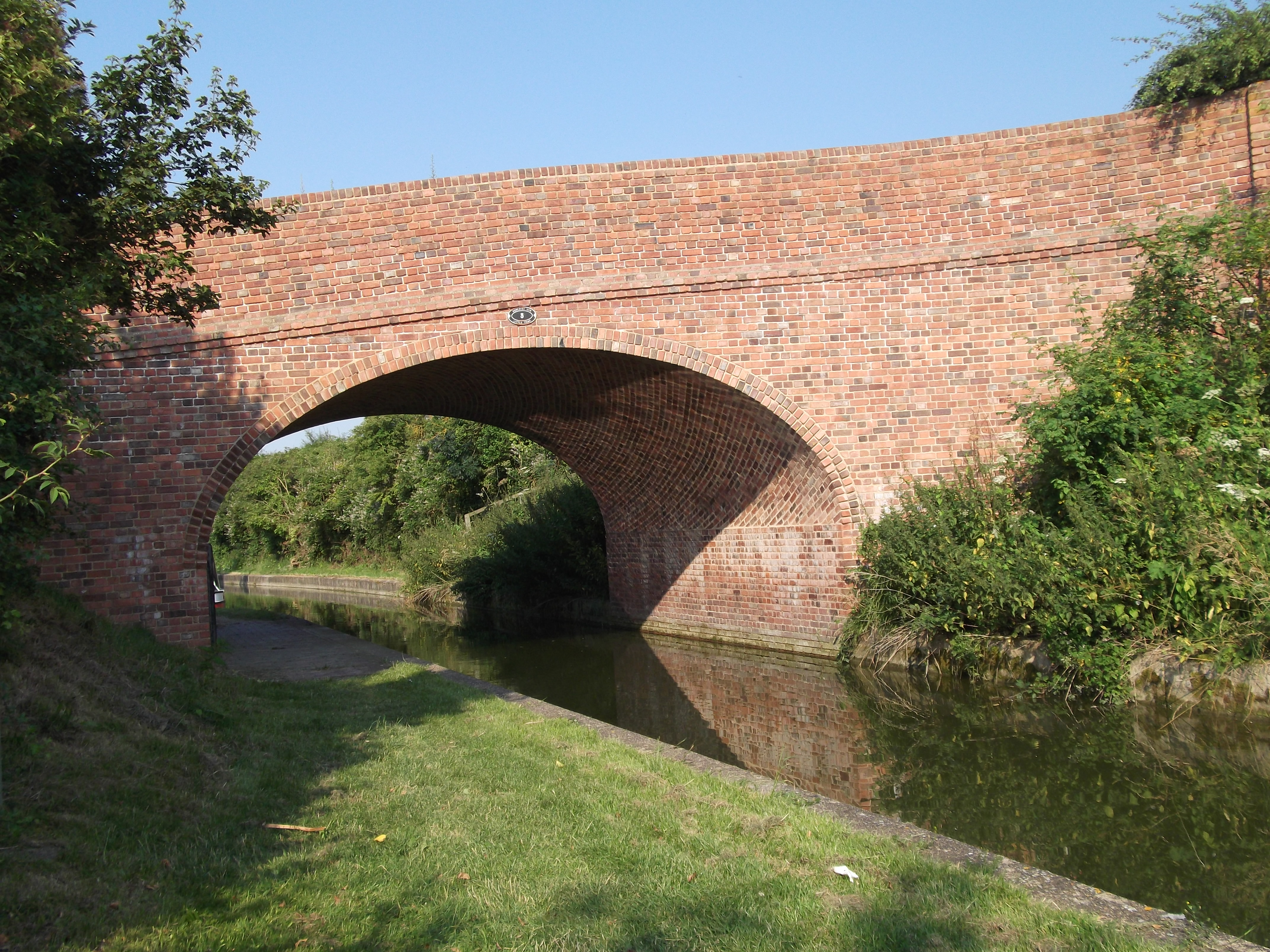
Reinstatement of Little Tring Road bridge was completed in 2001.

Phase 1 of the restoration involved the first 1.3 miles (2.1 km) of the canal from Bulbourne Junction (51.8156°N 0.6538°W) to Little Tring Farm (51.8072°N 0.6741°W). Major engineering work included the refurbishment of the stop lock, and the construction of a winding basin at the terminus, to allow boats to turn round. Between the two, Little Tring Road crossed the course of the canal on an embankment which was constructed in 1973 when the original bridge was demolished. This was replaced by a new reinforced concrete bridge, built to a traditional design, which is faced with bricks to give it an authentic appearance. It was funded by the Wendover Arm Trust (which was the original name for the trust), and the award-winning bridge was completed by British Waterways in 2000–01 at a cost of £223,000.

In 2003 the Association of Independent Navigation Authorities (AINA) published a report called Demonstrating the value of waterways, in which they outlined methods for assessing restoration projects, and their likely social and economic benefits. British Waterways produced a report in the following year, called Waterways 2025 – Our vision for the shape of the Waterways Network, which used many of the methods suggested by the AINA report to identify 18 restoration schemes which they thought might be completed before 2025, and which they would support. The Wendover Canal appeared in the list, but the report was abandoned two years later, after other groups claimed that not being included undermined their ability to raise funds.

The Phase 1 project was completed on 28 March 2005, when the refurbished section between Tringford stop lock and the new winding basin was opened. Construction had been finished in November 2004, and the new section was re-watered during March 2005. The total cost of this phase was £400,340.

=== Phase 2 ===
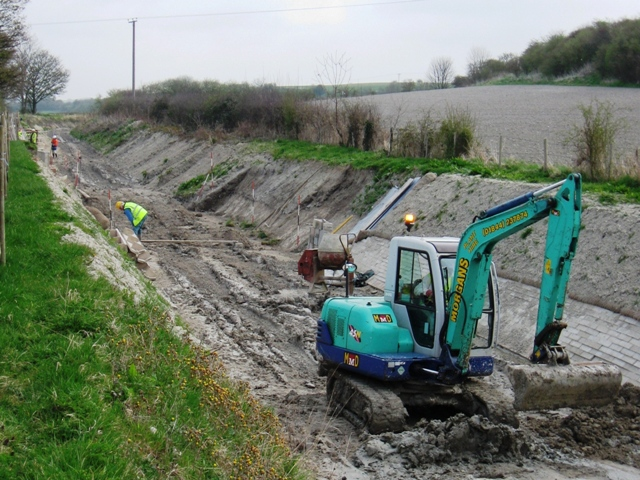
Relining the dry canal bed near Drayton Beauchamp in April 2009

Phase 2 involves a 1.75-mile (2.8 km) dry section from Little Tring to Drayton Beauchamp (51.799°N 0.6915°W), and includes the navigable culvert under the Aston Clinton bypass. Original plans drawn up in the late 1990s for converting the A41 to a dual carriageway and bypassing Aston Clinton included a low level crossing of the canal, which would have prevented restoration. However, negotiations resulted in the Highways Agency funding a diversion of the canal to a point where there was sufficient headroom for navigation. The Trust argued that an 18-inch (460 mm) pipe to carry away rain water from the road would be insufficient in storm conditions, and that excavating 630 yards (580 m) of new canal would be a better solution. The old route of the canal has become a reed bed, acting as a settling pond for water from the road, before it joins the new channel. British Waterways funded restoration of a further 120 yards (110 m) through Drayton Beauchamp bridge, where repairs to the feeder pipeline which runs along the bottom of the canal were needed to prevent flooding in the village. The pipeline will not be needed once the work is completed. However it will remain in place under the canal, and is having to be capped with concrete to prevent the restored canal collapsing into it. As work proceeds, the channel is being re-profiled, and then lined with Bentomat liner, which consists of a layer of Bentonite clay sandwiched between two layers of geotextile. Concrete blocks have been laid over the liner on the side walls of the channel, with turf above water level. As each new section is re-profiled, the spoil removed is used to cover the bed of the canal on the previous section to a depth of 1 foot (300 mm).

While the phase one section is navigable by broad-beamed boats, the phase two section will only accommodate narrow boats. The re-profiled channel has sloping sides, which benefit wildlife but do not allow mooring, and so three 50-yard (46 m) mooring recesses have been built. Around 0.25 miles (0.40 km) of this section were rewatered in 2009, and although water levels were initially kept lower than the design depth, the channel successfully held water for the first time in 120 years. The rewatered section runs eastwards from Drayton Beauchamp, rather than connecting to the section which is already navigable, and a further 440 yards (400 m) was rewatered during 2015. To speed up progress, the Trust considered using contractors for some of the work, and in November 2015 submitted a bid jointly with the Canal and River Trust (CRT) for a grant of £1.9 million to the Heritage Lottery Fund. This successfully passed the first round of discussions but the Trust and CRT pulled out of submitting the second stage documentation after it was discovered that the section near Tring bridge, which had been used for landfill, was filled with noxious waste, rather than domestic rubbish. This meant that specialist handling and disposal of the infill would be required, and they were unable to sensibly cost this within the deadlines for the submission.

Work on the next section continued, and through the period of the Covid-19 pandemic, regular working parties were swelled by local volunteers from the Waterway Recovery Group, whose other activities were curtailed by the lockdown. With technical support provided by the Inland Waterways Association's Restoration Hub, the 475 yards (434 m) between bridge 4a and bridge 4 were completed, with rewatering beginning on 27 November 2021 and expected to take about three weeks. That only left about 0.5 miles (0.8 km) of canal between bridge 4 and the navigable section at Little Tring. This section included the 200 yards (180 m) of noxious infill, which was mainly ash, but contained traces of lead from paint and plumbing products. A trial excavation of a small part of this was funded by the Trust during 2021, leading them to conclude that the cost of removing all of the infill for processing could be met from available funds. Additional funds would then be needed for the materials required to continue the restoration work. However, in mid-2022 Dacorum Borough Council made a grant of £135,000 towards the cost of removal of the infill, to supplement £20,000 from Tring Council given earlier in the year and a legacy from a local resident. This funding paid for contractors to remove 1,400 tons of infill, so that work on the Little Tring section could continue.

=== Phase 3 ===
Phase 3, from Drayton Beauchamp via Buckland Wharf (51.7942°N 0.707°W) and Halton (51.7833°N 0.735°W) to Wendover (51.766°N 0.7411°W), requires major engineering work to three road bridges. This section has never been de-watered but is environmentally sensitive. The channel will require dredging, with work to improve the towpath and probably to raise and strengthen some of the banks. The canal passes the site of Aston Clinton House, owned by Sir Anthony de Rothschild and his descendants from 1853 to 1923, and subsequently used as a school and hotel. The property and its grounds were acquired by Buckinghamshire County Council between 1959 and 1967, and the house was demolished, to be replaced by Green Park Training Centre. This location was suggested as a site for a trailboat festival in 2020. The canal ends at a wider section, which was the location of Wendover Wharf, beyond which is a gauging station on the feeder supplying the canal.

== Route ==
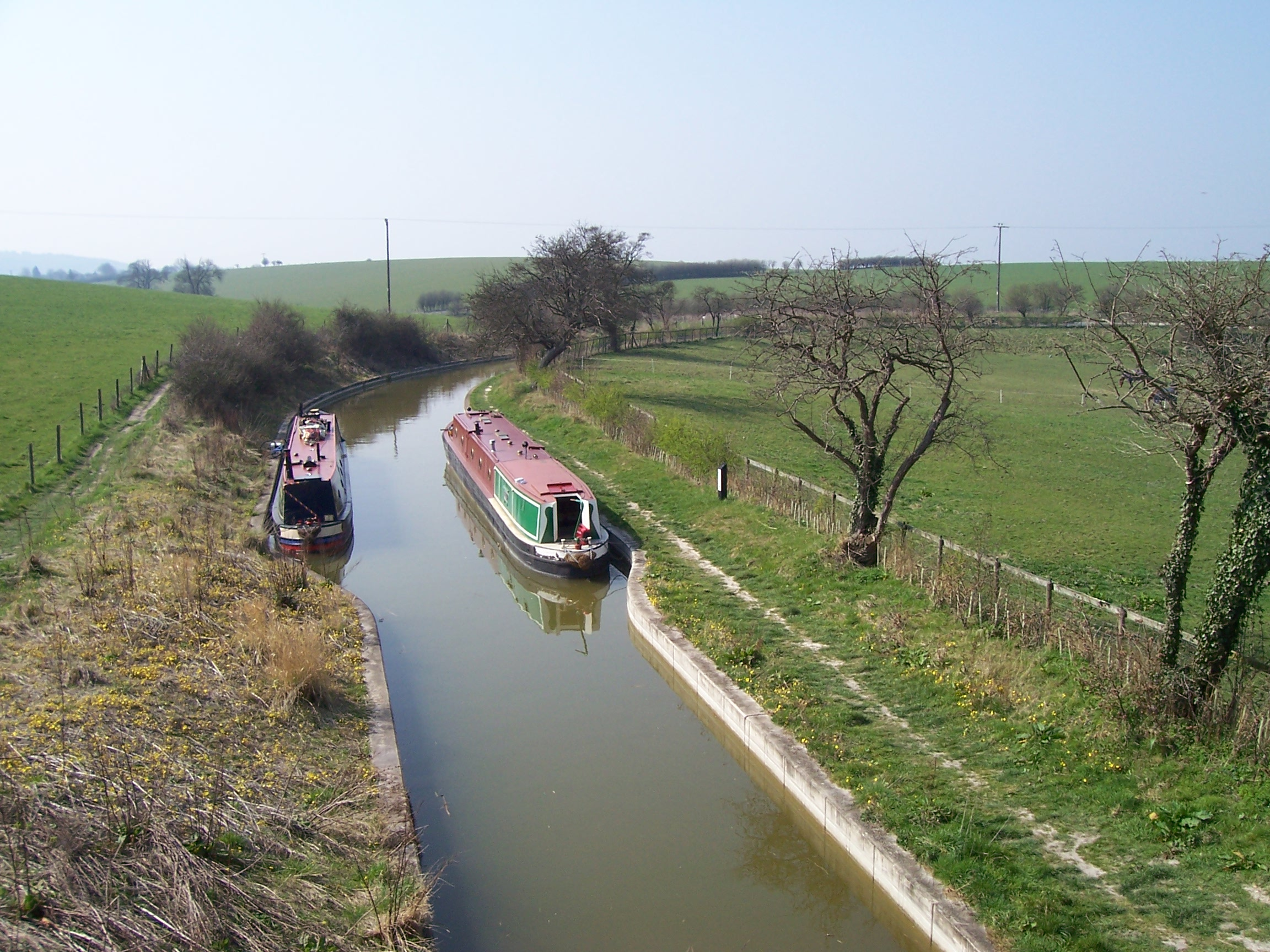
Phase 1 Little Tring Bridge to Winding Basin

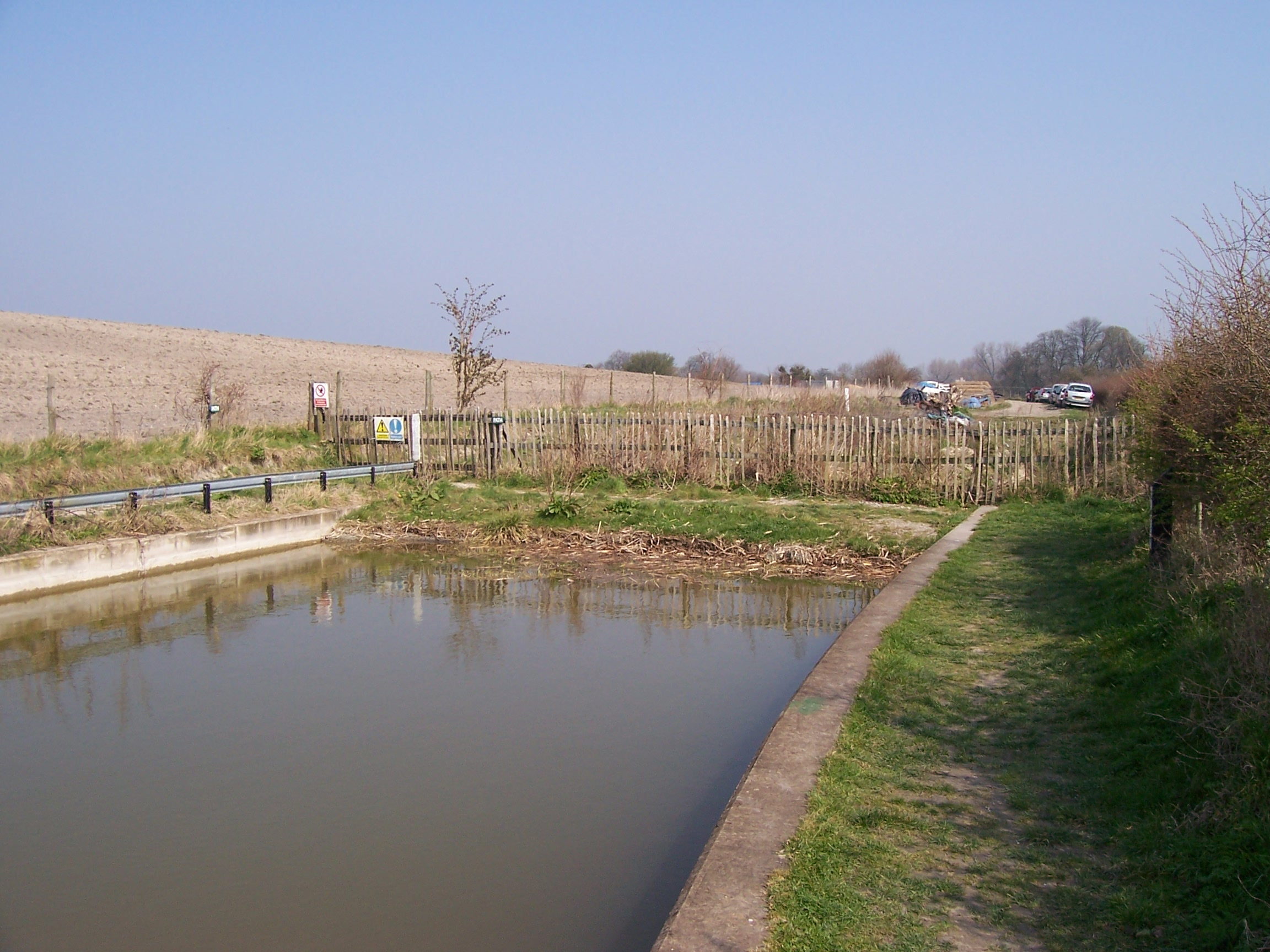
The Phase 1 head of navigation near Little Tring Farm

The water supply for the canal originates to the south of Wendover in surface springs and artesian wells near Wellhead Farm and the grade II* listed church of St Mary, which is constructed of flint rubble and blocks of stone. Much of it dates from the fourteenth century, although it was heavily restored in 1839 and 1869. The water flows northwards through the town, past a former water mill, which was operational until 1923, but was converted into a house between 1929 and 1931. It enters Wendover Basin, the start of the canal, where the flow is monitored by a gauging station. Records of the flows exist for the period between 1841 and 1897, and from 1963 onwards, making it the earliest known set of such records in the United Kingdom. The canal runs in a northerly direction, with a towpath on the western bank, and is crossed by a footbridge at the site of the branch line to Halton Camp. The start of a channel which connects the canal to Weston Turville reservoir is marked by a paddle on the towpath. The reservoir, which is a designated nature reserve, covers 70 acres (28 ha), and is used for fishing and by Aylesbury Boat Club for sailing.

The canal loops around the east and north of the village of Halton, passing under Perch bridge and Halton bridge, after which it runs in a generally north-easterly direction. There is a footpath on both sides of the canal at this point. As it reaches the edge of RAF Halton, there is a grade II listed bridge made of ornamental ironwork, with piers of ashlar stone and brick. Halton House is a large country house, built between 1881 and 1883 for Alfred de Rothschild, which has been used as an officers mess since 1919. At Harelane bridge, the footpath on the left bank stops, and the towpath continues on the right bank. On the opposite side to the towpath is Green Park, once the grounds of Aston Clinton house, where there is a wharf, and a swing bridge once gave access from the grounds to the towpath. The next crossing is Bucklandwharf Bridge, which carries the former A41 road, and the towpath crosses back to the left hand bank at this location. Just beyond it is an accommodation bridge, which allows residents to reach a row of cottages. As the canal approaches the A41 bypass, the old bed has been turned into a reedbed, to filter the runoff from the road before it enters the canal. A paddle controls the flow into the canal, which has been diverted to the south, to pass under the road where it is at a higher level. Beyond the crossing, the channel rejoins its original course, and continues to Drayton Beauchamp bridge.

The section beyond the bridge contained the culvert to maintain the flow to Tringford pumping station, some of which has now been rewatered, and is the location for the current restoration work by the Wendover Arm Trust. The canal crosses the border between Buckinghamshire and Hertfordshire, and then there are two wooden footbridges, erected in 2007 to provide easier access to the canal bed while it was being restored. The second one is on the site of a swing bridge which carried a road from Tring to Wilstone reservoir. Between them, the remains of Whitehouses wharf and pumping station have been excavated. Part of the canal was filled with rubbish in the early twentieth century by the local authority, and was excavated by bottle collectors before restoration began. There is no towpath on a short section to Little Tring bridge, but walkers can follow a minor road to rejoin the canal, which is navigable at this point.

A public footpath follows the right bank for most of the way to Gamnel Bridge, but leaves the canal to join the B488 road at Tring. A permissive path runs along the left bank, passing the grade II listed Tring pumping station, Heygates flour mill, and the site of Bushell's Boat Yard. This is the only part of the canal which was built on an embankment, rather than following the contours of the land. Gamnel Bridge, which dates from 1797, is a narrow hump-backed bridge, constructed of brown bricks with a red brick arch and blue brick decoration and copings. To the left of the final section is Tring Sewage Treatment Works, built in the late nineteenth century by the Urban District Council, assisted by funding from Nathan and Emma Rothschild. Its outflow normally supplements the water in the canal. However, between July 2012 and April 2013, the inlet screens failed to operate correctly on several occasions, and the canal became polluted with sewage sludge and debris. The Environment Agency prosecuted the operators, Thames Water, who were fined £1 million, the largest fine ever imposed for such a prosecution. Thames Water subsequently replaced the inlet screens at a cost of £30,000. The Arm joins the main line of the Grand Union canal at a footbridge which carries the towpath, next to which is a toll house. To the north, the main line starts its descent through the Marsworth locks, while to the south it continues on the level to Bulbourne and beyond.

== Bibliography ==
- Anglesey, Melanie (19 May 2011). "Boxmoor gives canal festival a new home". Watford Observer. Archived from the original on 20 June 2021.
- Cumberlidge, Jane (2009). Inland Waterways of Great Britain (8th Ed.). Imray Laurie Norie and Wilson. ISBN 978-1-84623-010-3.
- Denny, Andrew (January 2016). "Wending its way to restoration". Waterways World. ISSN 0309-1422.
- Hadfield, Charles (1970). The Canals of the East Midlands. Newton Abbott: David & Charles. ISBN 978-0-7153-4871-0.
- Gulland, Diana (2003). "Aston Clinton House, Buckinghamshire" (PDF). Rothschild Archive. Archived (PDF) from the original on 8 February 2016.
- Jackson, Mike; et al. (2013). "Water in Reserve" (PDF). Royal Geographical Society. Archived (PDF) from the original on 16 February 2016.
- Ludgate, Martin (8 June 2021). "Restoring & reopening the Wendover Arm of Grand Union Canal". Canal Boat. Archived from the original on 3 December 2021.
- Nicholson (2006). Nicholson Guides Vol 1: Grand Union, Oxford and the South East. Harper Collins. ISBN 978-0-00-721109-8.
- Potter, Hugh (August 2009). "Canal to the Chilterns". Waterways World. ISSN 0309-1422.
- Priestley, Joseph (1831). Historical Account of the Navigable Rivers, Canals and Railways of Great Britain. London: Longmans, Green & Co. Archived from the original on 13 March 2016.
- Sargeant, Chris (Winter 2017). "Chairman's column" (PDF). Wendover Arm News. Archived (PDF) from the original on 14 December 2020.
- Savage, Shelley (2013). Water from Wendover. Tring & District Local History and Museum Society. ISBN 978-0-9549860-1-8.
- Squires, Roger (2008). Britain's restored canals. Ashbourne, Derbyshire: Landmark Publishing. ISBN 978-1-84306-331-5.
- Ware, Michael E. (1989). Britain's Lost Waterways (2nd ed.). Buxton: Moorland Publishing Company. ISBN 0-86190-327-7.
