= Leicestershire and Northamptonshire Union Canal =

Canal in England

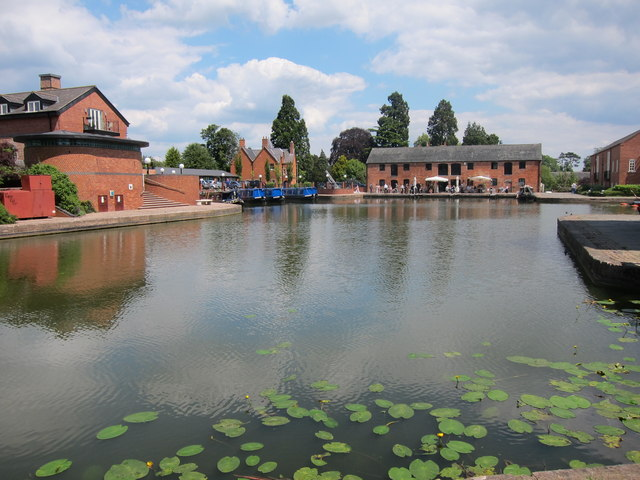
- The Leicestershire and Northamptonshire Union Canal terminus at Union Wharf, Market Harborough

Specifications
- Length: 22.6 miles (36.4 km)
- Locks: 23

History
- Modern name: Grand Union Canal (Leicester Branch)
- Date of act: 30 April 1793
- Date completed: 21 October 1809

Geography
- Start point: Leicester
- End point: Market Harborough

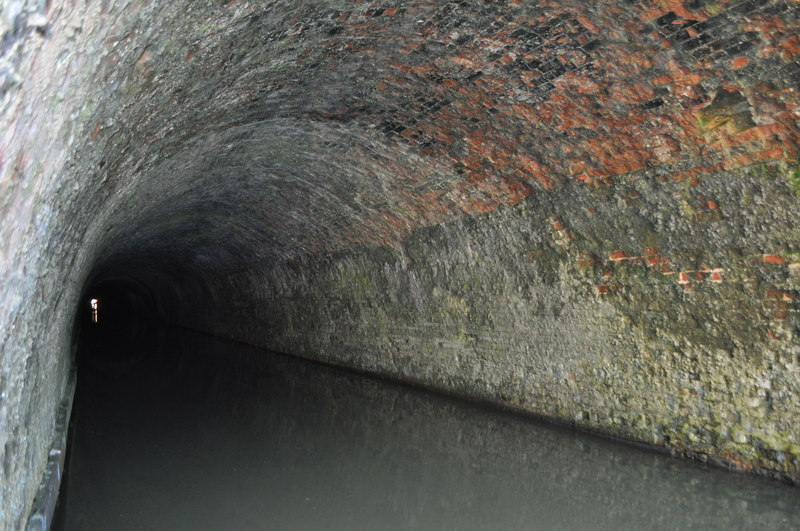
Saddington Tunnel.

The Leicestershire and Northamptonshire Union Canal is a canal in England that is now part of the Grand Union Canal.

== History ==
Leicestershire and Northamptonshire Union Canal Act 1793 (Note: Section 1(2) of the Grand Union Canal Act 1943 (6 & 7 Geo. 6. c. v).)
- Act of Parliament
- Parliament of Great Britain
- Long title: An Act for making and maintaining a Navigation from the Town of Leicester to communicate with the River Nen, in or near the Town of Northampton; and also a certain Collateral Cut from the said Navigation.
- Citation: 33 Geo. 3. c. 98
- Territorial extent: Great Britain

Dates
- Royal assent: 30 April 1793
- Commencement: 13 December 1792 (Note: Start of session.)

Status: Current legislation

Text of statute as originally enacted

An act of Parliament, the Leicestershire and Northamptonshire Union Canal Act 1793 (33 Geo. 3. c. 98) was passed for the Leicestershire and Northamptonshire Union Canal: this was intended to link the Soar Navigation near Leicester to the River Nene near Northampton, and thus to the Grand Junction Canal via the latter's Northampton Arm. The Leicestershire and Northampton union reached the village of Debdale by 1797. The one major tunnel between Leicester and Market Harborough at Saddington was completed by 1797 but in doing so had used up all of its money. James Barnes, an engineer working on the Grand Junction Canal, was asked in 1799 to find a route for the canal to reach the Grand Junction at Braunston. In 1802, he produced a revised proposal, to route the rest of the canal to Norton on the Grand Junction, with a branch to Market Harborough. Thomas Telford was then asked for his opinion, and he also proposed a change of destination to Norton, but via the town of Market Harborough. This was agreed upon, but by 1809, the canal had reached only Market Harborough, where construction came to an end again. It opened on Friday 13 October 1809. The opening was reported in the Northampton Mercury of 21 October 1809.

Yesterday sennight was the day appointed for opening the Union Canal to Market-Harborough: at eleven o’clock the committee and subscribers began to assemble at Gallow-Hill Wharf, where a barge and two boats, provided with seats and awnings, and adorned with laurel flags, and streamers, were waiting to receive them. At half-past twelve o’clock they embarked, accompanied by a band of music, and a number of ladies and people from Harborough, and the neighbourhood. The day was remarkably fine; the shore on each side of the canal was lined with spectators; the whole presented a scene, grand, pleasing, and highly interesting. At Great-Bowden Wharf, the procession was joined by eight barges, deeply laden with coals, cokes, slates and merchandise, and the whole proceeded forward upon that part of the canal which has been recently finished, and in little more than an hour entered the bason at Harborough, amid the shouts of spectators. - The Committee and subscribers, preceded by engineers, navigators, and bargemen, carrying instruments, tools, and implements descriptive of their respective occupations, two barge horses, streamers flags, and a band of music, walked in procession to the Angel Inn. Between three and four o’clock, they sat down to a very elegant and sumptuous dinner; the table was plentifully supplied with fish and venison by the munificence and public spirit of J. Cradock Esq. of Gumley, whose liberality in this respect, the Union Canal Company at their general assemblies have beforetime frequently experienced. Many loyal and constitutional toasts were drank, and the evening concluded with hilarity and friendly conviviality. Foot races and ass races for the amusement of the populace, took place at intervals during the afternoon, and notwithstanding the multitudes of people assembled, happily no accident of any serious consequence happened, and to the credit of the navigators and workmen on the works and buildings, (though they were plentifully regaled with ale), no disturbance or quarrel, inconsistent with decorum and the peace of the town took place.

Thus have the Union Canal Company, after a period of 15 years from its commencement, finished a vast work, of great public utility. Very few canals in the same distance, have had to encounter such difficulties in the course of the undertaking – nearly 200 feet of lockage; a tunnel more than half a mile in length, two considerable aqueducts, other large embankments, a large reservoir, and several hundred yards of very deep cutting, have been completed. Their country is unquestionably much indebted to them for their successful exertions, and every friend to its improvement and manufactures, will rejoice if the trade upon the canal is such as to afford them a reasonable remuneration for the immense capital they have embarked in the concern.

— Northampton Mercury

On 1 October 1813 the connection was completed by the original Grand Union Canal Company which had been formed to make a connection between the canal at Foxton and the Grand Junction canal at Norton Junction.

On 23 August 1865 as a result of a torrential downpour, the canal was breached at Smeeton where the feeder from Saddington Reservoir joins the canal. Several hundred yards of embankment was washed away and ten miles of canal was drained.

The company was eventually bought by the Grand Junction Canal company in 1894.

It is 48 miles (77 km) long with 22 locks, one aqueduct and a 1/2-mile-long (800 m) tunnel, the Saddington.

== See also ==
- Grand Union Canal (old)
- Canals of Great Britain
- History of the British canal system
- Waterscape
