= Grand Union Canal (old) =

Canal in England

Old Grand Union
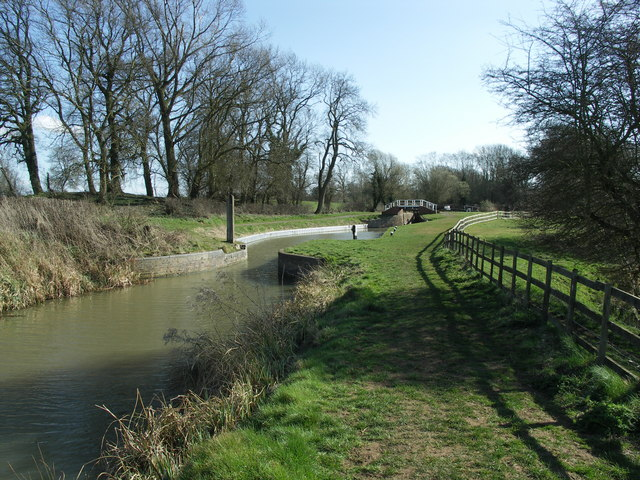
- The narrows below Welford Lock was once the site of a swing bridge
- Interactive map of Old Grand Union

Specifications
- Locks: 18
- Status: Navigable
- Navigation authority: Canal & River Trust

History
- Date of act: 1810; 216 years ago

Geography
- Start point: Foxton
- End point: Norton Junction, near Long Buckby

The Grand Union Canal was a canal in England from Foxton, Leicestershire on the Leicestershire and Northamptonshire Union Canal to Norton Junction, close to Long Buckby Wharf on the Grand Junction Canal. It now forms the first 23 miles (37 km) of the Leicester line of the Grand Union Canal.

== Name ==
The original name "Grand Union" derived from the fact that it was in effect an extension of the older Leicestershire and Northamptonshire Union Canal (LNU) – or rather a substitute for the southern half of the LNU's originally proposed route. The "Grand Union" name survived until the canal was bought by the Grand Junction in 1894 and became known as the Leicester Line of the Grand Junction. The larger Grand Junction Canal was subsequently bought by the Regent's Canal and from 1 January 1929 the whole network was known as the Grand Union Canal. Where clarity between the two Grand Unions is needed, the original Grand Union Canal is generally referred to as the Old Grand Union.

== History ==
An act of Parliament, the Leicestershire and Northamptonshire Union Canal Act 1793 (33 Geo. 3. c. 98), was passed for the Leicestershire and Northamptonshire Union Canal: this was intended to link the Soar Navigation near Leicester to the River Nene near Northampton, and thus to the Grand Junction Canal via the latter's Northampton Arm. The Leicestershire and Northampton union reached the village of Debdale by 1797, but in doing so had used up all of its money. James Barnes, an engineer working on the Grand Junction Canal, was asked in 1799 to find a route for the canal to reach the Grand Junction at Braunston. In 1802, he produced a revised proposal, to route the rest of the canal to Norton on the Grand Junction, with a branch to Market Harborough. Thomas Telford was then asked for his opinion, and he also proposed a change of destination to Norton, but via the town of Market Harborough. This was agreed upon, but by 1809, the canal had reached only Market Harborough, where construction came to an end again.

The Grand Junction Canal Company were concerned about these delays to the opening of the important route to the east Midlands, which would bring traffic onto their canal from the River Trent and the Nottinghamshire and Derbyshire coalfields. They requested James Barnes and Thomas Telford to revisit the question of route once again, and they developed a plan for a canal to link the part of the Leicestershire and Northamptonshire Union Canal which had been built with the Grand Junction Canal, which had been fully open since 1805.

Experience on the Grand Junction showed that broad boats caused delays as they could not pass in the tunnels, and so the Grand Junction was happy for the new canal to be built with only narrow locks, but with broad tunnels and bridges to allow passing of boats.

Grand Union Canal (Old) Act 1810
- Act of Parliament
- Parliament of the United Kingdom
- Long title: An Act for making and maintaining a navigable Canal from the Union Canal, in the parish of Gumley, in the county of Leicester, to join the Grand Junction Canal near Buckby, in the county of Northampton; and for making a collateral Cut from the said intended Canal.
- Citation: 50 Geo. 3. c. cxxii

Dates
- Royal assent: 24 May 1810

Text of statute as originally enacted

With the Leicestershire and Northamptonshire route unfinished, a bill was put to Parliament to authorise a new canal, known as the Grand Union Canal, from the Leicestershire and Northamptonshire Union Canal at Foxton, to Norton on the Grand Junction Canal. The Grand Union Canal (Old) Act 1810 (50 Geo. 3. c. cxxii) received royal assent on 24 May 1810, entitled "An Act for making and maintaining a navigable Canal from the Union Canal, in the parish of Gumley, in the county of Leicester, to join the Grand Junction Canal near Buckby, in the county of Northampton; and for making a collateral Cut from the said intended Canal". The company had an authorised capital of £245,000, and powers to raise a further £50,000 if this proved necessary. Benjamin Bevan was employed as the engineer and construction began at Foxton.

The terrain to be crossed was problematic for the canal engineers, as demonstrated by the several proposals made for routes. The core of the problem was the lack of river valleys or other obvious routes to take. The undulating countryside meant that the chosen route needed many twists and turns to maintain a level. However, the route does not keep as strictly to contours as the early canals of James Brindley did; the worst potential diversions were avoided by cuttings, embankments, and two significant tunnels, one of 1,528 yards (1,397 m) at Crick and another of 1,166 yards (1,066 m) at Husbands Bosworth, both of which were wide enough for narrowboats to pass.

From the junction with the Leicestershire and Northamptonshire Union Canal, at Foxton, the new canal immediately climbed through the ten Foxton Locks, to its 20.5-mile (33.0 km) summit level. By late 1812, the Foxton flight was completed, and the canal to the eastern portal of Husbands Bosworth Tunnel was opened. The tunnel was completed by May of the following year, opening up 10 miles (16 km) of the main line. In addition, around 1 mile (1.6 km) of the branch to Welford was opened at this time. Further west, problems were encountered at Crick, where the rocks were unsuitable for tunnelling, and quicksands were found. A new route to the east of the village was authorised, and cost an extra £7,000. At Watford, the canal descended through the seven Watford Locks to the same height as the summit of the Grand Junction Canal, allowing a level junction with it at Long Buckby (Norton Junction). To avoid a deep cutting and a short tunnel at Watford, the company eventually agreed to buy the land they needed from a Mrs Bennett, despite the cost of £2,000 plus £125 per acre (£310/ha). She drove a hard bargain, insisting that she be allowed to keep a pleasure boat on the summit level, and that she should appoint the Watford lock keeper, to ensure that he would always be civil to her and her tenants, and would protect her property from damage by boatmen. The company agreed, providing that the lock keeper was suitably qualified.

The main line of the canal was completed in 1814, and opened on 9 August. The 1.6-mile (2.6 km) Welford Arm, which was essentially a navigable feeder, since it connected to the reservoirs which provided the water supply, was not completed until November. The total cost of the project was around £292,000, which rose by another £13,500 the following year. The main line was 23.2 miles (37.3 km) long, with a level pound of 20.5 miles (33.0 km) between the locks at Foxton and those at Watford. The opening of the Grand Union Canal provided an additional source of water for the northern summit level of the Grand Junction Canal.

== Development ==
The new canal was not a commercial success, mainly because there was little local traffic, and it relied on traffic passing through from other canals. The company correspondence shows large amounts of effort devoted to negotiations on rates, but it was not in a strong position, and coal was carried at around one third of the rate authorised by the enabling act of Parliament. Pig iron and other heavy castings only raised 1 1/2d (0.6p) per ton per mile, whereas on the Monmouthshire Canal at the time, such cargoes were charged at 5d (2p) per ton per mile. Despite this, they had managed to repay most of their debts by 1826, and paid the first dividend to shareholders of one per cent. All loans had been repaid by 1836, and the dividend rose to 1.25 per cent in 1840.

With the opening of the London and Birmingham Railway in 1838, and the prospect of lower tolls, men who were committee members of the Grand Junction Canal began buying shares in order to obtain financial control of the Grand Union. A close working relationship developed with the Leicestershire and Northamptonshire Union to help stave off competition from the railways, but toll receipts spiralled downwards, from £7,551 in 1848 to £3,108 in 1858, £1,024 in 1875 and just £742 in 1885. Dividends followed this trend, reaching 0.05 per cent in 1885. Costly repairs were carried out on both of the tunnels, which interrupted traffic while the work was done, and the company managed to build an ice-boat and a dredger, but by 1884, they were almost penniless.

== Takeover ==
In late 1886 or early 1887, the Grand Junction company inspected the Grand Union Canal and the Leicestershire and Northamptonshire Union Canal, and then wrote to both, about the possibility of measures to improve and increase traffic. Both indicated they were prepared to sell out to the Grand Junction, who then offered £5,000 for the two. The canals replied with a counter offer of £25,000, since they had a large asset in their water supplies, but no agreement was made. In 1893, the company met with Mr Fellows, of the carrying company Fellows Morton & Clayton, who suggested that if the locks at Foxton and Watford were made wider, and the canal was dredged, conditions would be much better, and they would be able to run large steam boats, which would allow them to compete with the railways. After making enquiries, Fellows was offered both of the canals for £20,000, and after further discussion with the Grand Junction company, they asked him to act as their agent and buy both. He negotiated a price of £10,500 for the Grand Union, and £6,500 for the Leicestershire and Northamptonshire Union, with £250 to be paid to the clerk who acted for both companies. An act of Parliament to authorise the takeover, the Leicestershire and Northamptonshire Union and Grand Union Canals (Transfer) Act 1894 (57 & 58 Vict. c. lxxxv), was passed and the transfer of ownership took place on 29 September. After takeover, the canal became known as the Leicester Line of the Grand Junction Canal.

The Grand Junction dredged the canals they had bought, and negotiated with the Leicester, the Loughborough, and the Erewash Canal, to fix tolls for through traffic. They then talked to Fellows Morton & Clayton again, and revived the plans to allow them to work wide-beam barges over the Grand Union route. Plans for an inclined plane at Foxton Locks were approved in July 1897, tenders were received in November, and the contract was given to J & H Gwynne & Co, based in Hammersmith. The design was by G. C. Thomas, the Grand Junction Canal's engineer, who had been assisted by his brother, and Gwynne's price was £14,130. Two counterbalanced caissons could each hold two narrow boats or one wide-beam barge, and could raise or lower them the 75 feet (23 m) between the top and bottom of the lock flight in twelve minutes, compared to the seventy that using the locks took. Including land purchase, the total cost was £39,224, which also included the provision of an engine house and steam engine to power the plane. The plane was completed and began operating on 10 July 1900.

Thomas did not favour a second inclined plane, and so widening of the locks at Watford was authorised in early 1900, at a cost of £17,000, but was deferred in March, until the work at Foxton was completed and the inclined plane was operational. In August they complained to Fellows Morton & Clayton that through traffic of coal had continued to decline, and they rebuilt the locks at Watford between November 1901 and February 1902. The work cost £5,545, as they were not widened, and wide-beam craft were never able to use the canal. Despite the failure of the scheme, the company recommended to the royal commission held in 1906 that a number of other canals should be upgraded to take 80-ton barges, and suggested that several other inclined planes should be built. In November 1908, the locks at Foxton were re-opened for night-time working, and the inclined plane officially stopped working in November 1910, although it is known to have worked intermittently until at least 1912. It was dismantled in 1926 and sold for scrap in 1928.

In an attempt to become more competitive, the Grand Junction company talked to the Regent's Canal company, and the idea of a much larger concern began to develop. The Regent's Canal and Dock Company (Grand Junction Canal Purchase) Act 1928 (18 & 19 Geo. 5. c. xcviii) was obtained in August 1928, which allowed the amalgamation of the Regent's Canal, the Grand Junction, the Warwick and Birmingham, the Birmingham and Warwick Junction and the Warwick and Napton canals. As from 1 January 1929, the new company began operating, and the old Grand Union Canal became part of the (new) Grand Union Canal. Having raised £881,000 to enable the route from Birmingham to London to be widened to take boats with a 12.5-foot (3.8 m) beam, and received Government grants to cover interest payments on loans of £500,000, the work began in 1931. The company then decided they could get grants for widening the Foxton and Watford locks, and under the Grand Union Canal (Leicester Canals Purchase, &c.) Act 1931 (21 & 22 Geo. 5. c. cvii) bought the Leicester, the Loughborough and the Erewash canals. The estimated cost of widening the two flights was £144,000, but the government refused to make a grant later that year, and the work was never carried out.

== Points of interest ==
Point	Coordinates (Links to map resources)	OS Grid Ref	Notes
Jn with Market harborough Branch	52.5016°N 0.9826°W	SP691897	bottom of Foxton Locks
Husbands Bosworth Tunnel	52.4579°N 1.0570°W	SP641848	Eastern portal
Welford Junction	52.4375°N 1.0784°W	SP627825	
Welford Basin	52.4230°N 1.0550°W	SP643809	End of Welford Arm
A14 road bridge	52.3922°N 1.0922°W	SP618775	
Crick Tunnel	52.3438°N 1.1287°W	SP594721	Northern portal
Top of Watford Locks	52.3150°N 1.1312°W	SP593688	
Norton Junction	52.2860°N 1.1178°W	SP602656	(New) Grand Union main line

== See also ==
- Canals of the United Kingdom
- History of the British canal system

== Bibliography ==
- Hadfield, Charles (1970). The Canals of the East Midlands. David and Charles. ISBN 978-0-7153-4871-0.
- Nicholson (2003). Nicholson Guides Vol 3: Birmingham and the heart of England. Harper Collins. ISBN 978-0-00-713666-7.
- Priestley, Joseph (1831). "Historical Account of the Navigable Rivers, Canals, and Railways of Great Britain". Archived from the original on 7 March 2016.
