= Passenham =

Village in Northamptonshire, England

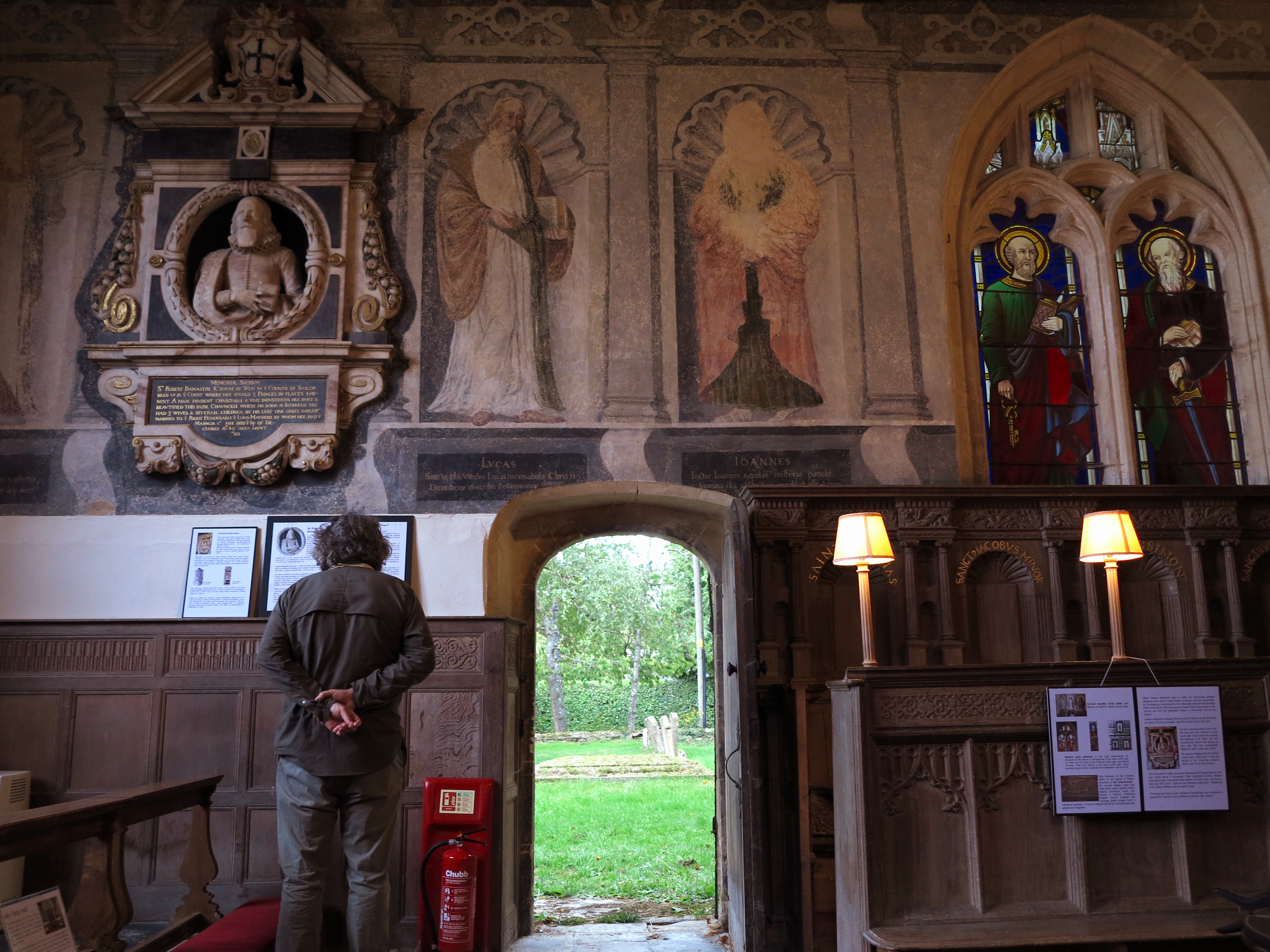
- Interior view of the chancel in St Guthlac's church, with the memorial to Sir Robert Banastre and part of the chancel's 16th century painted wall decorations

- Location within Northamptonshire
- Interactive map of Passenham
- OS grid reference: SP780395
- Civil parish: Old Stratford
- Unitary authority: West Northamptonshire
- Ceremonial county: Northamptonshire
- Region: East Midlands
- Country: England
- Sovereign state: United Kingdom
- Post town: Milton Keynes
- Postcode district: MK19
- Dialling code: 01908
- Police: Northamptonshire
- Fire: Northamptonshire
- Ambulance: East Midlands
- UK Parliament: South Northamptonshire

Passenham is a small village in West Northamptonshire, England. It is just north of the River Great Ouse, which forms the boundary with Buckinghamshire, and close to (but separated by the river from) Stony Stratford in Milton Keynes.

The village's name means 'Passa's hemmed-in land'.

== Governance ==
The village parish council is joined with the village of Old Stratford which also administers the village and both are part of West Northamptonshire. It was governed by South Northamptonshire District Council and Northamptonshire County Council until local government changes in 2021.

On 11 November 1948 the civil parish of "Passenham" was renamed "Deanshanger".

== Landmarks ==
The church of St Guthlac has a late 13th-century tower, the upper part rebuilt 1626. The chancel was built in 1626 by Sir Robert Banastre (who died in 1649). Some remarkable furnishings, stalls and misericords date from 1626. There are also original wall paintings which were restored in the 1960s. Also notable are box pews, stained glass and a monument to Banastre.

== The Stony Stratford hoard ==
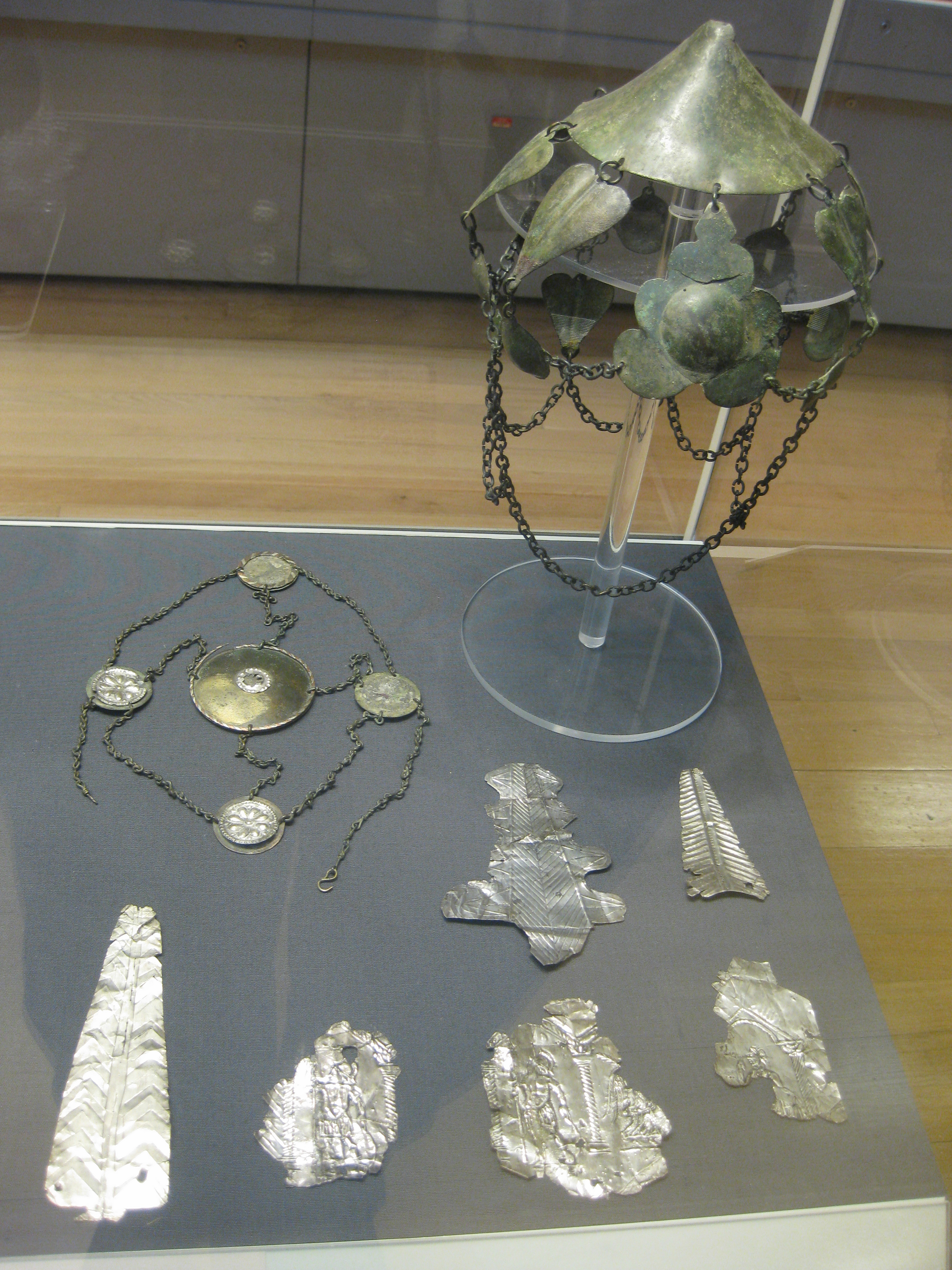
The Stony Stratford Hoard, on display at the British Museum

The Stony Stratford Hoard was found in 1789, possibly near Passenham. It is not known where it originally came from or how it got there. Even the location of the find-spot is somewhat speculative, since the only recorded information is in a Minute of a June 1813 meeting of the Society of Antiquaries of London, which identifies the find spot as "Windmill Field, near Stony Stratford". Historians Brown and Roberts conjectured that the field concerned is the one in nearby Passenham; other Northamptonshire sources concur. (Note: though not the British Museum.) (A 1608 map of the Whittlewood Forest area, shows a windmill on the east side of the road leading south into Passenham, a little to the north of Manor Farm. (Note: The relevant part of the map is reproduced at "Old Stratford". Milton Keynes Heritage Association. and can be matched to the six-inch Ordnance Survey mapping for the same area.)) Brown and Roberts also identified crop markings at the east end of that field, leading them to conjecture that to be the most likely location. (Note: SP7808840059 (52.0534°N 0.8626°W)) An urn was uncovered that contained between 50 and 60 fragments of silver and gilt bronze plaques. "In addition there are two objects sometimes described as ensigns or head-dresses". The fragments include images of the Roman deities Mars, Apollo, and Victoria and inscriptions ascribed to Jupiter and Vulcan, leading to theories that this was a votive hoard at a Roman temple. The hoard is now kept at the British Museum.
