= Old Stratford =

Village in Northamptonshire, England

Coordinates: 52.063°N 0.865°W

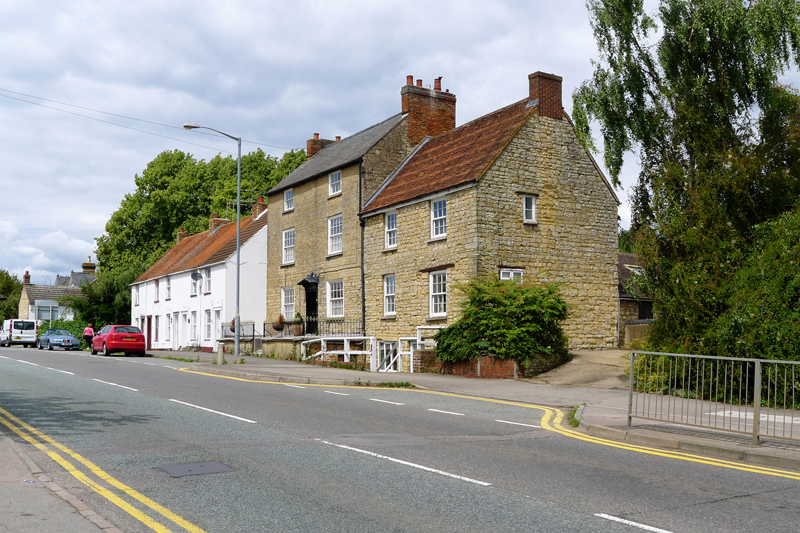
- Towcester Road

- Location within Northamptonshire
- Interactive map of Old Stratford
- Population: 2,077; 1,996 (2011)
- OS grid reference: SP779411
- Civil parish: Old Stratford
- Unitary authority: West Northamptonshire
- Ceremonial county: Northamptonshire
- Region: East Midlands
- Country: England
- Sovereign state: United Kingdom
- Post town: MILTON KEYNES
- Postcode district: MK19
- Dialling code: 01908
- Police: Northamptonshire
- Fire: Northamptonshire
- Ambulance: East Midlands
- UK Parliament: Daventry

Old Stratford is a village and civil parish in West Northamptonshire, England. The population of the civil parish (including Passenham) at the 2011 Census was 1,935. The 'Stratford' part of the village name is Anglo-Saxon in origin and means 'ford on a Roman road'. The Roman road in this sense is the Watling Street that runs through the middle of the village.

== Location ==
The village lies immediately north of where the Watling Street crossed the River Great Ouse; just south of this crossing point is the town of Stony Stratford in Milton Keynes. (The ford was replaced by a causeway and stone bridge many years ago). The Ouse forms the boundary of the civil parish with that of Stony Stratford and also that between Northamptonshire and Buckinghamshire. The village is located adjacent to the junction of the A5 (northwards towards Towcester and southwards towards Milton Keynes), the A422 (westwards towards Buckingham) and the A508 (northwards towards Northampton).

== History ==
Old Stratford historically straddled the three parishes of Passenham (renamed Deanshanger in 1948), Furtho and Cosgrove. A new civil parish of Old Stratford was formed on 1 April 1951 from parts of each of those three parishes. The small village of Passenham, which lies a short distance upriver from Old Stratford, formed part of the new parish.

The Stony Stratford Hoard may have been found in Passenham.

The Buckingham Arm of the Grand Union Canal passed through the village but has been disused since 1964. There remains a "Wharf Lane" and signs of the path of the old canal through the village towards Buckingham.

== Facilities ==
The village has a few local facilities (two motor dealers, a Chinese takeaway, a fried chicken takeway and a corner shop), and relies on Stony Stratford and Milton Keynes for a broader range of shops as well as for its medical, financial and other professional needs.

There is a primary school part of West Northamptonshire Council local education authority. The nearest secondary school is in Deanshanger.

== Administration ==
The village has a parish council.

The parish is governed in turn by West Northamptonshire Council.
