= Foxton Inclined Plane Trust =

Waterway society in England

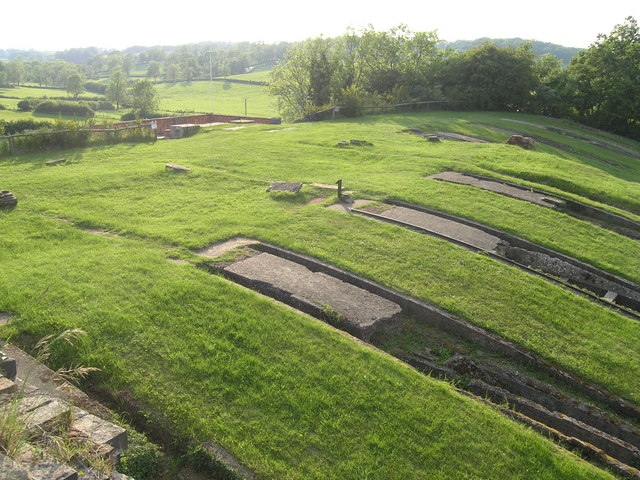

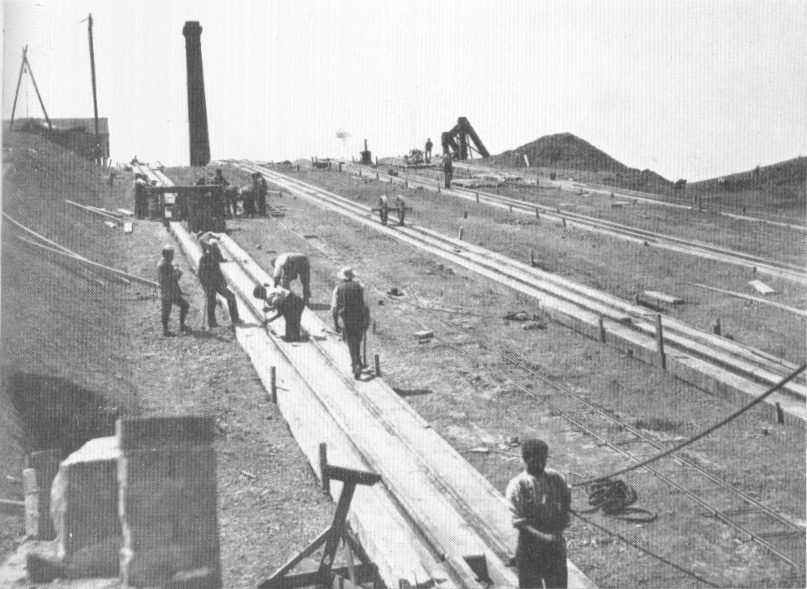

The Foxton Inclined Plane Trust is a waterway society and a registered charity on the Grand Union Canal in Foxton, Leicestershire, England, UK. It was founded in 1980 to promote the restoration of the Victorian boat lift or inclined plane, a unique and famous piece of canal history.

The Trust runs the Foxton Canal Museum which was opened in 1989 and is also the Trust headquarters, in the former boiler house.

It is campaigning for the full restoration of the boat lift, and it is a partner in the Foxton Locks Partnership, composed of British Waterways, the Inland Waterways Association, the Old Union Canals Society and local authorities.

The Foxton Locks Partnership has already obtained £1.78 million from the Heritage Lottery Fund for preliminary restoration works on the site, including:

- re-watering an arm of the canal
- dredging and repairing the bottom basin
- replacing a missing bridge over the Harborough Arm
- improving footpaths for better access to the 8 hectares (20 acres) site

The Foxton Inclined Plane was opened in 1900, refurbished between 1909 and 1910, and closed in 1911. It was demolished in 1928.

The Inclined plane is part of a site which includes a scheduled monument and a Grade II* listed staircase of locks.

== See also ==
- Foxton Locks with information about Lock staircases, and a section on the Foxton Inclined Plane
- List of waterway societies in the United Kingdom
