= Tardebigge Engine House =

Engine house in Worcestershire, England

Coordinates: 52.3186°N 2.0185°W

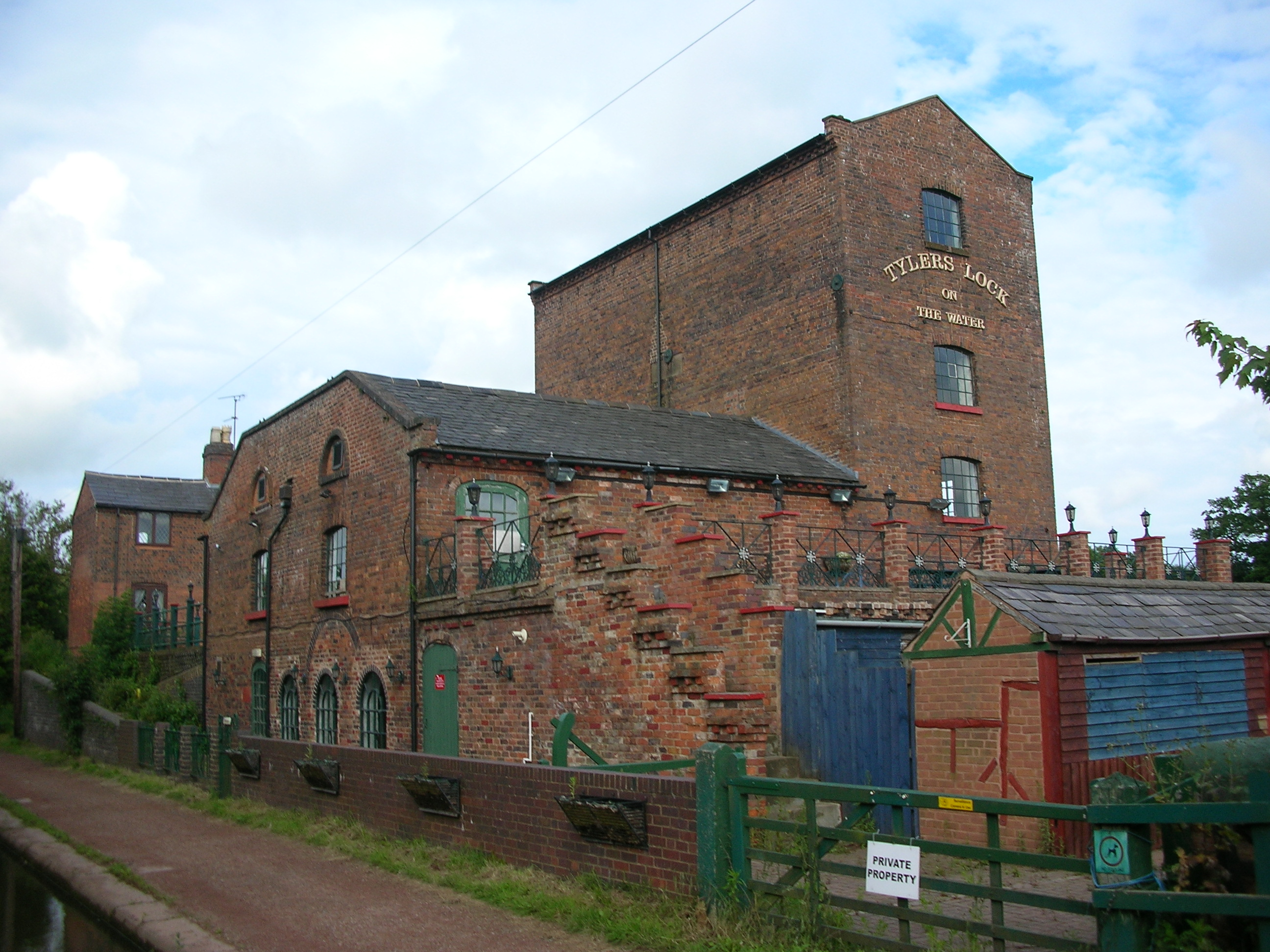
Tardebigge Engine House

Tardebigge Engine House (grid reference SO988689) is a former canal-pumping engine house at Tardebigge, Worcestershire, England. It is grade II listed.

It stands near lock 57 (one lock below the top lock, 58) of the Tardebigge Locks on the Worcester and Birmingham Canal and contained a steam-powered Newcomen-Watt beam engine, which was removed in 1915. It was used to pump water from the adjacent Tardebigge feeder reservoir, which is about 50 ft (15.2 m) below the level of the top pound of the canal.

At one time, a pub, The Tylers Lock, it was advertised for sale in April 2007, with planning permission to convert it into a residence.

Tylers Lock is now owned by Vigo Software Ltd, and had planned to convert the building into offices; however planning permission was rejected in 2008.

The building is now 4 apartments

== See also ==
- Canals of the United Kingdom
- History of the British canal system
