= Tardebigge Lake =

Lake in Worcestershire, England

Tardebigge Reservoir
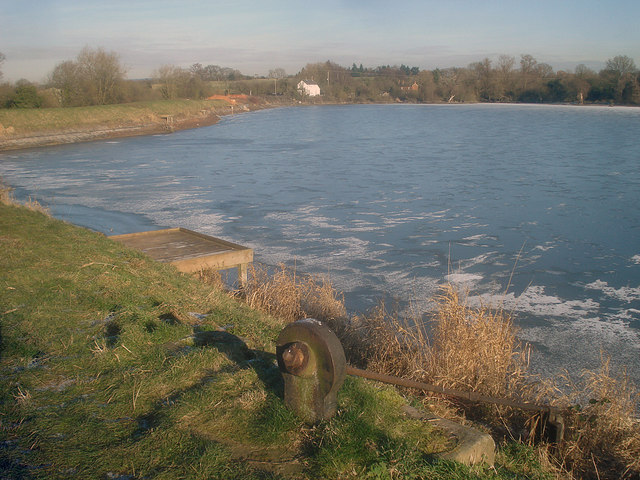

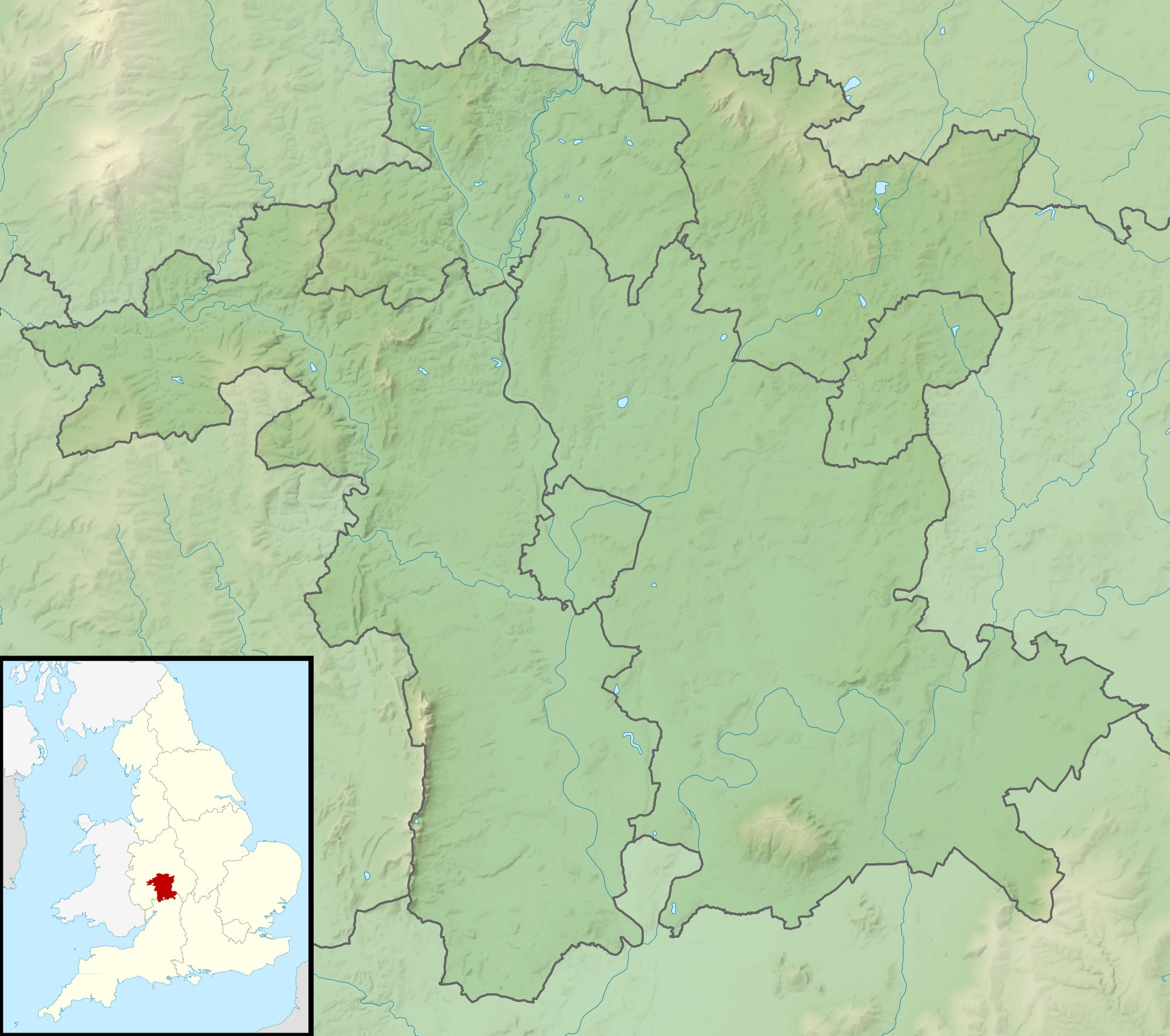
- Location within Worcestershire
- Location: Worcestershire
- Coordinates: 52°18′50″N 2°1′25″W
- Type: reservoir
- Basin countries: United Kingdom
- Surface area: 25 acres (10 ha)

Tardebigge Lake is a large feeder reservoir, about 25 acres (100,000 m^{2}) in size, built to supply water for the famous flight of locks running from Tardebigge towards Worcester, on the Worcester and Birmingham Canal. It is maintained by the Canal and River Trust and still supplies water to the canal system. The lake is up to 40-foot (12 m) deep at the dam end, shelving off to around 15 feet (4.6 m) at the inlet end.

Access to walkers is allowed to the dam end and the side of the lake alongside the canal path.

== Fishing ==
The lake was used for many years as a general fishery run by Cadbury's of Bournville, then licensed by British Waterways. It is now run as a closed syndicate and, as it increases in popularity, spaces for the syndicate are limited.
