= Foxton Locks =

Foxton Locks and Inclined Plane
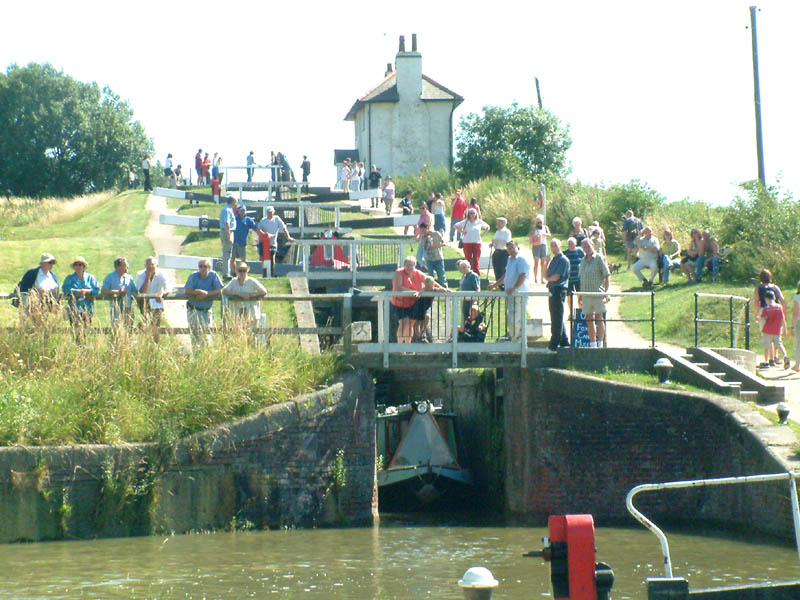
- Upper staircase of Foxton Locks

- Location within Leicestershire
- 52.4998°N 0.9830°W
- Location: Leicestershire, UK

History
- Built: 1813 and 1900

Site notes
- Architect(s): Benjamin Bevan (Canal & Locks), Gordon Cale Thomas (Inclined Plane)
- Governing body: Canal & River Trust

Listed Building – Grade II*
- Official name: Foxton Locks, Grand Union Canal Leicester line
- Designated: 7 December 1966
- Reference no.: 1360753

Listed Building – Grade II
- Official name: Lock-Keeper's Cottage adjacent to Foxton Top Lock
- Designated: 9 March 1989
- Reference no.: 1360774

Listed Building – Grade II
- Official name: Lock-Keeper's Cottage with adjoining stable block and Foxton Canal Craft Shop, adjacent to Foxton Bottom Lock, Grand Union Canal
- Designated: 9 March 1989
- Reference no.: 1061459

Scheduled monument
- Official name: Inclined Plane immediately east of Foxton Locks
- Designated: 24 January 1973
- Reference no.: 1018832

Foxton Locks (grid reference SP691895) are ten canal locks consisting of two "staircases" each of five locks, located on the Leicester line of the Grand Union Canal about 3 miles (5 km) west of the Leicestershire town of Market Harborough. They are named after the nearby village of Foxton.

They form the northern terminus of a 20-mile (32 km) summit level that passes Husbands Bosworth, Crick and ends with the Watford flight

Alongside the locks is the site of the Foxton Inclined Plane, built in 1900 to resolve the operational restrictions imposed by the lock flight. It was not a commercial success and only remained in full-time operation for ten years. It was dismantled in 1926, but a project to re-create it commenced in the 2000s, since the locks remain a bottleneck for boat traffic.

== Description ==
Staircase locks are used where a canal needs to climb a steep hill, and consist of a group of locks where each lock opens directly into the next, that is, where the bottom gates of one lock form the top gates of the next. Foxton Locks are the largest flight of such staircase locks on the English canal system. Foxton has two sets of five staircase locks but the sets are separated by a short stretch of water known as a ‘pound’. Caen Hill has 29 locks and Tardebigge has 30, but, crucially, these are separated by pounds and so are not staircase locks. The locks are equipped with side pounds, with white paddles emptying a lock into a side pound, and red paddles filling the next lock downstream from the pound. This saves water compared to the more common riser staircases, since changing the direction of traffic does not require emptying/filling almost all the locks.

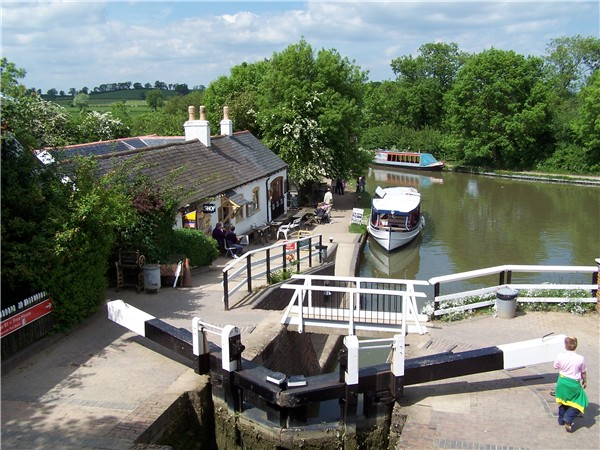
Bottom of Foxton Locks

Building work on the locks started in 1810 and took four years. The locks were opened on 1 October 1813.

Little changed until the building of the inclined plane resulted in the reduction in size of some of the side pounds. While the inclined plane was in operation the locks were allowed to fall into decline to an extent and in 1908 the committee released £1,000 to bring the locks back into full (nightly) operation.

In 2008, the locks became part of the European Route of Industrial Heritage, a network which seeks to recognize the most important industrial heritage sites in Europe.

The locks are usually staffed during the cruising season from Easter to October and padlocked outside operating hours. This is done to prevent water shortages due to misuse and to ensure a balance between those wishing to ascend and descend. There can be lengthy delays at busy times but the actual transit should take approximately 45 minutes to one hour to complete; it is made quicker by the fact that the locks are narrow beam and the gates are light.

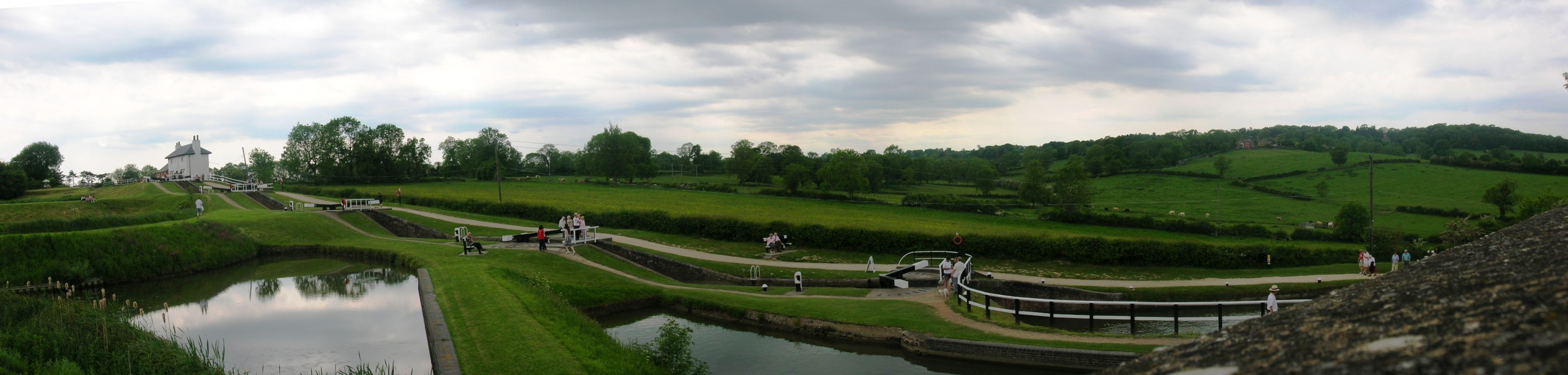
Panorama of the upper staircase

== Tourism ==
The Grade II* listed locks are a popular tourist attraction and the county council has created a country park at the top. At the bottom, where the junction with the arm to Market Harborough is located, there are two public houses, a shop, trip boat and other facilities. The area is popular with ramblers, interested enthusiasts and similar.

The Foxton Canal Museum is located in the former boiler house for the plane's steam engine. The museum covers the history of the locks and the plane, the lives of the canal workers, and other aspects of the local canal. There is also a collection of Measham pottery. The museum opened in 1989 and is accredited by the Museums, Libraries and Archives Council.

== See also ==
- Bingley Five Rise Locks in West Yorkshire
- Bingley Three Rise Locks in West Yorkshire
- Foxton Inclined Plane Trust
- Watford Locks in Northamptonshire
- Caen Hill Locks near Devizes, Wiltshire
- Fourteen Locks near Newport, South Wales
- Tardebigge Locks near Bromsgrove, Worcestershire
