= Tutnall and Cobley =

Civil parish in Worcestershire, England

Coordinates: 52.330199°N 2.01067°W

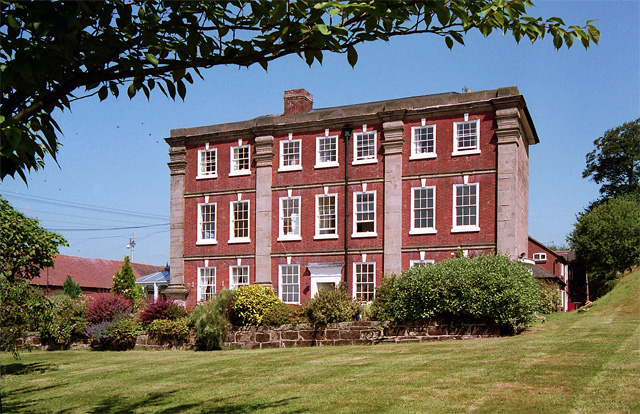
- Tutnall Hall

- Location within Worcestershire
- Population: 1,543 (2001 census)
- OS grid reference: SO988702
  - London: 100 miles (160 km)
- Civil parish: Tutnall and Cobley
- District: Bromsgrove
- Shire county: Worcestershire
- Region: West Midlands
- Country: England
- Sovereign state: United Kingdom
- Post town: Bromsgrove
- Postcode district: B60
- Dialling code: 01527
- Police: West Mercia
- Fire: Hereford and Worcester
- Ambulance: West Midlands
- UK Parliament: Bromsgrove

Tutnall and Cobley is a civil parish in the Bromsgrove district of Worcestershire, England. In 2001 the parish had a population of 1,543. The villages of Tutnall and Tardebigge are within the parish; the Cobley part of the parish name may refer to Cobley Hill.
