= Foxton, Leicestershire =

Village in Leicestershire, England

Coordinates: 52.5038°N 0.9684°W

Foxton
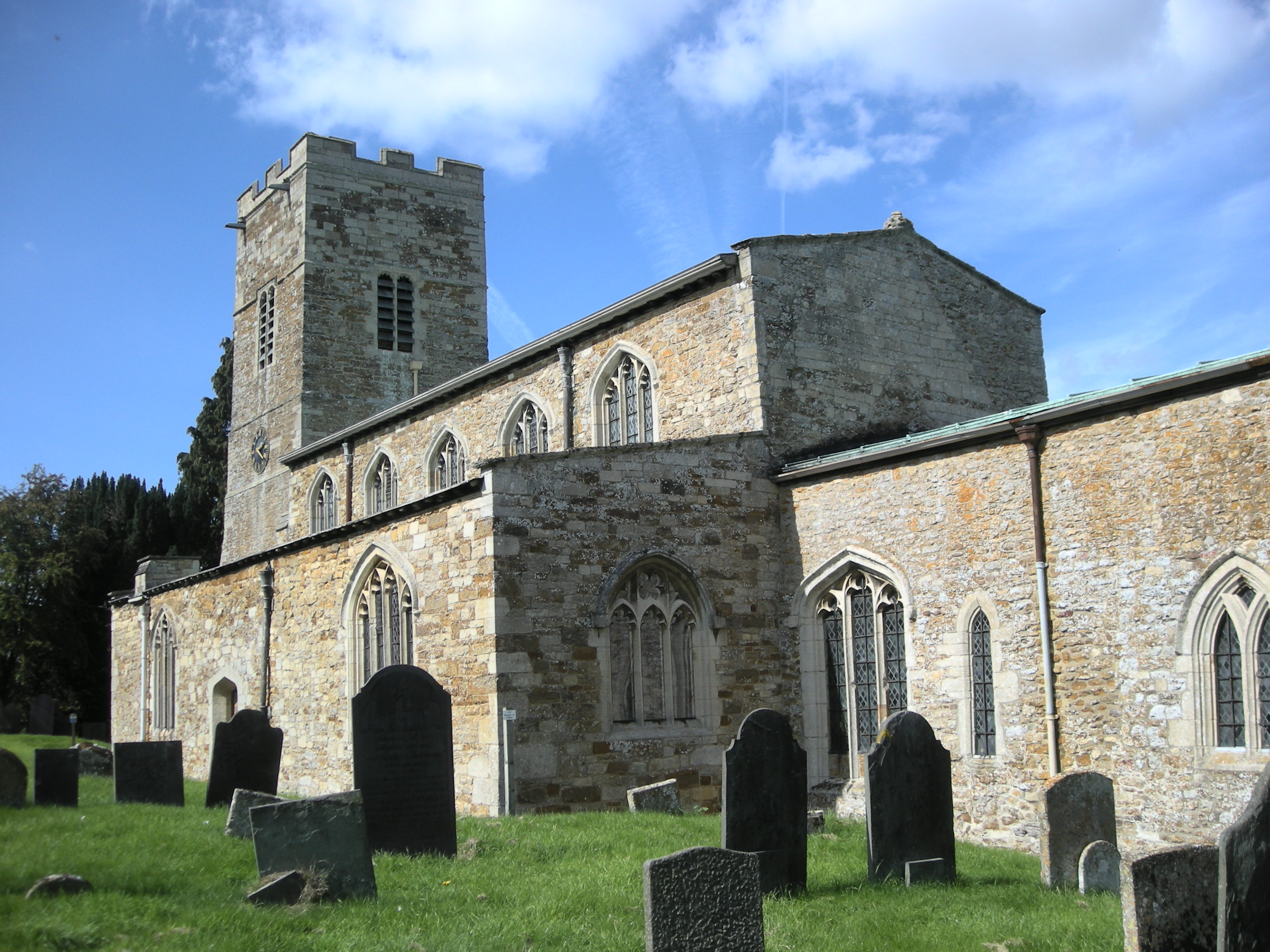
- Parish Church of St Andrew

- Location within Leicestershire
- Population: 478 (2011)
- OS grid reference: SP 701 900
- Civil parish: Foxton
- District: Harborough
- Shire county: Leicestershire
- Region: East Midlands
- Country: England
- Sovereign state: United Kingdom
- Post town: Market Harborough
- Postcode district: LE16
- Dialling code: 01858
- Police: Leicestershire
- Fire: Leicestershire
- Ambulance: East Midlands

Foxton is a village and civil parish in the Harborough district, in the county of Leicestershire, England, to the north-west of Market Harborough. The village is on the Grand Union Canal and is a short walk to the site of the Foxton Locks and Foxton Inclined Plane. Swingbridge Street still has a working swing bridge that allows people and vehicles to pass over the canal, which can be opened to allow canal boats to pass. There are two public houses in the village, a village hall, and a primary school. Foxton is serviced by Market Harborough train station which is approximately 3 miles away. London and Birmingham can each be reached by train in approximately 50 minutes.

== History ==
The village has previously been known as Foxestone and Foxtone. It is believed to have developed these names from the large number of foxes which inhabited the area. Foxton was originally a hill-top settlement, thought to have been founded in Saxon times with a landscape fashioned in the ice-age. The village gradually moved down the valley side as a farming community, working on the open three field system until it was enclosed in 1770. Foxton remained virtually unchanged between Norman times until the end of the 18th century when the canal arrived from Leicester, cutting through the village. Agriculture began to diminish as improved communication and alternative job opportunities meant that people left their village to work and in the bringing of trade and industry via the canal. In 1935 a small area in the south-east of Foxton was transferred to Harborough, and a small part of Harborough was transferred to Foxton.

== Geography ==
The parish's approximately square ground area of 1,902 acres is hilly and well wooded. The soil is of a "rich loam; subsoil, clay". The Welland Valley was formed on the southern side of the village from a brook that cuts through Foxton from west to east; its highest point, just south of Foxton village, being 438 ft. above sea level. Features of the local countryside include spinneys and coverts which provide habitat for a large variety of wildlife.

Foxton is a nucleated village, it mainly consists of three parallel streets: Main Street, Middle Street and Swingbridge Street, which run down the hill in a north-easterly direction. The highest part of the village is home to the church and the manor house, which are cornered off from the rest of the village by the Grand Union Canal.

== Buildings ==
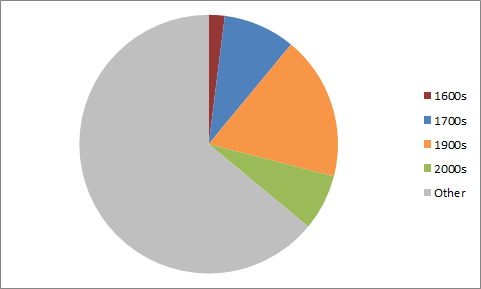
The Century of Origination of Dwellings in Foxton, as reported by Chambers O.B.E, David in 'A Foxton Heritage Project'

The village buildings are almost entirely built of red brick. The composition of the current dwellings of Foxton is illustrated in the pie chart to the right. It shows that 2% of the houses originate from the 1600s, "9% from the 1700s, 18% from the 1900s, and 7% from the present century". The oldest building in Foxton is St Andrew's church, which was originally built around 1200. In the 11th century the "earliest part of the Manor house was built" as the settlement developed. This was followed in the 13th century by the "building of a second manor house, whose foundations are Orchard House".

== Occupation ==
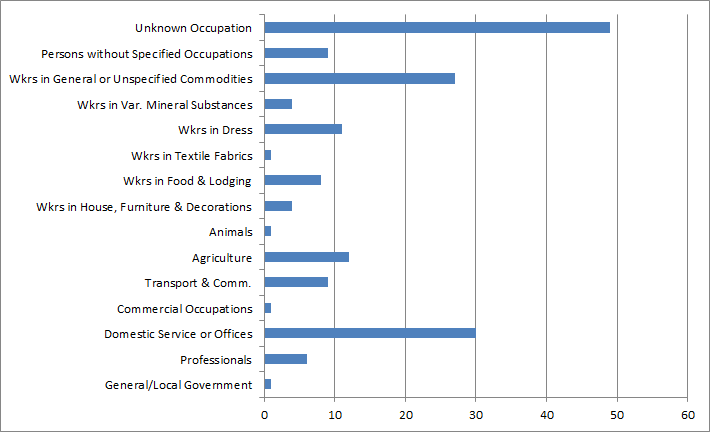
Occupation order graph of the citizens of Foxton in 1881

The occupational consistency of Foxton in the year 1881 was primarily of unknown occupation, as shown in the occupation chart to the left, this was because this sector was made up of women, who at that time the majority of which were unemployed. The highest specified occupation was Domestic Service or Offices, in which 28 females and 2 males worked. The highest specified occupation of men was agriculture, which has been a changing industry in Foxton.

Agricultural Change

Towards the end of the 18th century Foxton started to change from being a "truly agricultural village"; many dwellings housed "Stocking Frames where whole families, parents and children, toiled to produce worsted stockings". In 1801 "30 people were listed as agricultural workers" and "49 were recorded as being in "trade or manufacture". There was "development of the Foxton orchards",. There was also a "mushroom ketchup factory". It was because of these industries that "apple growing and mushroom collection still required agricultural workers", although the work would have been seasonal and possibly part-time occupations". Between 1750 and 1850, less traditional agricultural workers were needed and the 'primitive hovels' that they lived in were replaced with "more substantial brick cottages".

== Population ==
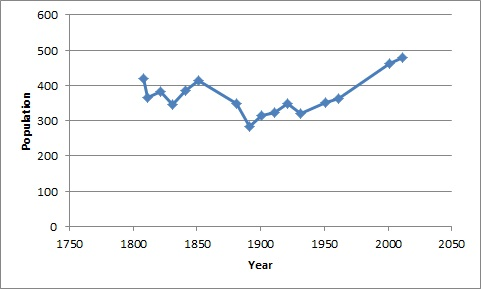
Total Population of Foxton Civil Parish, Leicestershire, as reported by the Census of Population from 1801 to 2011

Ratio of People per Dwelling 1880 - 2012, as reported by Chambers O.B.E, David in 'A Foxton Heritage Project'

Foxton's population has been increasing continuously since around 1930. This is illustrated in the line graph to the left, showing the changing population in Foxton, from 1800 until 2011; when the population reached a high of 478.

Population declined at the end of the 19th century; this is thought to be because people migrated away from "village and agricultural life as new employment opportunities stemming from the industrial revolution lured people away from rural life".

There were 90 dwellings in Foxton in 1890, although only 67 were occupied, as shown in the ‘Ratio of People per Dwelling 1880 – 2012’ table. "During the first two decades of the 20th century, the statistics suggest that despite an increasing population the house numbers continued to fall", as the number of dwellings, from 1890 to 1920, declined by 15 even though the population rose by 64. Some reasons for this contradiction are that "families were larger as infant mortality began to reduce". Also, small traditional and "insubstantial agricultural workers dwellings were replaced with larger cottages". Another reason is that "financial insecurity caused by World War I caused overcrowding in some existing dwellings".

== Places of interest ==
St Andrew's Church sits at the highest and southernmost point of the parish. It was a "centre for the religious life of a Saxon community", the oldest parts of which dating to about 1200AD. From 1891 to 1893 a restoration took place at the cost of £2,750, there is a commemorative plaque to signify this event

Robert Monk Hall was opened in 1931 by Robert Monk, its upkeep is supplied by a trust fund, and helps to assist the people of Foxton.

Foxton Locks is a site of touristic interest situated on the Grand Union Canal, it attracts many visitors to the area.

Manor House is situated south of the Grand Union Canal and north of Swingbridge Street. It is an 18th-century farmhouse on the site of an old Norman Manor which was held by Judith, niece of William the Conqueror, after the Norman Conquest.

== See also ==
- Foxton Inclined Plane Trust
