= Holliday Street Aqueduct =

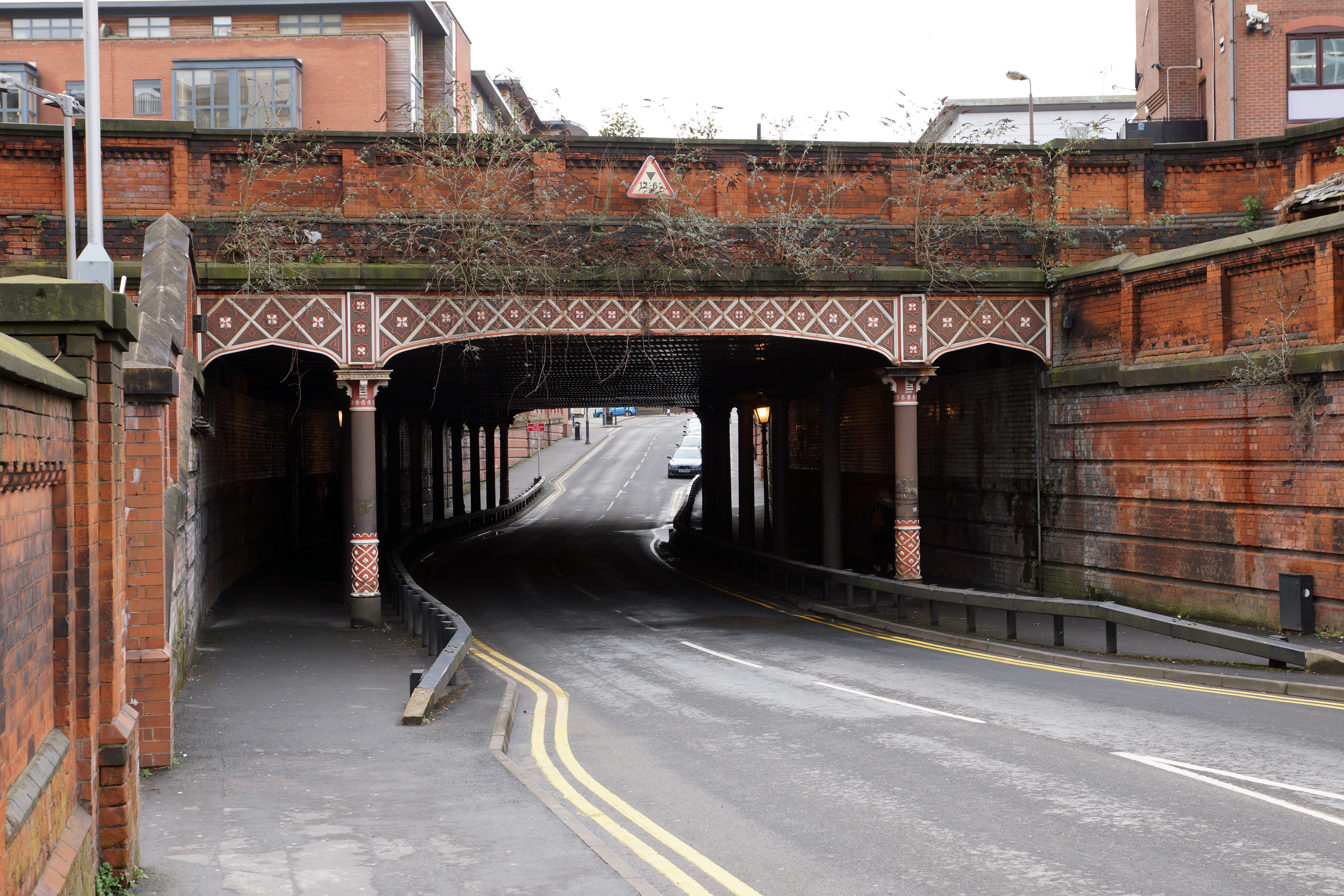
- Holliday Street Aqueduct in 2015
- Coordinates: 52.4762°N 1.9079°W
- Carries: Worcester and Birmingham Canal
- Crosses: Holliday Street
- Locale: Birmingham
- Maintained by: Canal & River Trust
- Heritage status: Grade II listed building

Characteristics
- Trough construction: Cast Iron
- Pier construction: Cast Iron
- Traversable?: Yes
- Towpaths: West side
- No. of spans: Three

The Holliday Street aqueduct is a canal aqueduct at the start of the Worcester and Birmingham Canal in Birmingham City Centre in central England. It is immediately south-west of Gas Street Basin.

== History and description ==
The aqueduct opened in 1881. It was built for the Birmingham West Suburban Railway to span an area formerly occupied by a canal wharf. The railway company was extending its line into New Street station just to the east. Its line, now part of the Cross-City Line, runs in a tunnel beneath Holliday Street. The iron used on the aqueduct was from the foundry of Andrew Handyside and Company in Derby.

The aqueduct is built in a combination of brick and cast and wrought iron. It has a span of 42 feet (13 metres) but a width of 156 feet (48 metres). The canal and towpath only occupy around 50 feet (15 metres) of the width on the western side. The rest is taken up by a road and buildings that were formerly part of a wharf. The aqueduct consists of transverse I-beam plate girders in wrought iron and riveted together, supported on 24 cast-iron columns which divide it into three spans. Brick jack arches fill the gaps between the girders and support the canal bed, which is in cast iron. At the east end, the aqueduct is on a slight curve, which required a complex arrangement of further transverse beams. On the outside faces is a decorative fascia which has a lozenge-shaped pattern similar to the decoration on the columns. Above that is a brick parapet.

In February 2015, a section of canal including the aqueduct was closed for several weeks while a leak was fixed. Water was found to be leaking into a disused railway tunnel and the canal was drained between two temporary dams. The leak was traced to a hole in the canal bed.

The aqueduct is a Grade II listed building, a status which affords it legal protection, first designated in July 1982.
