= Foxton Inclined Plane =

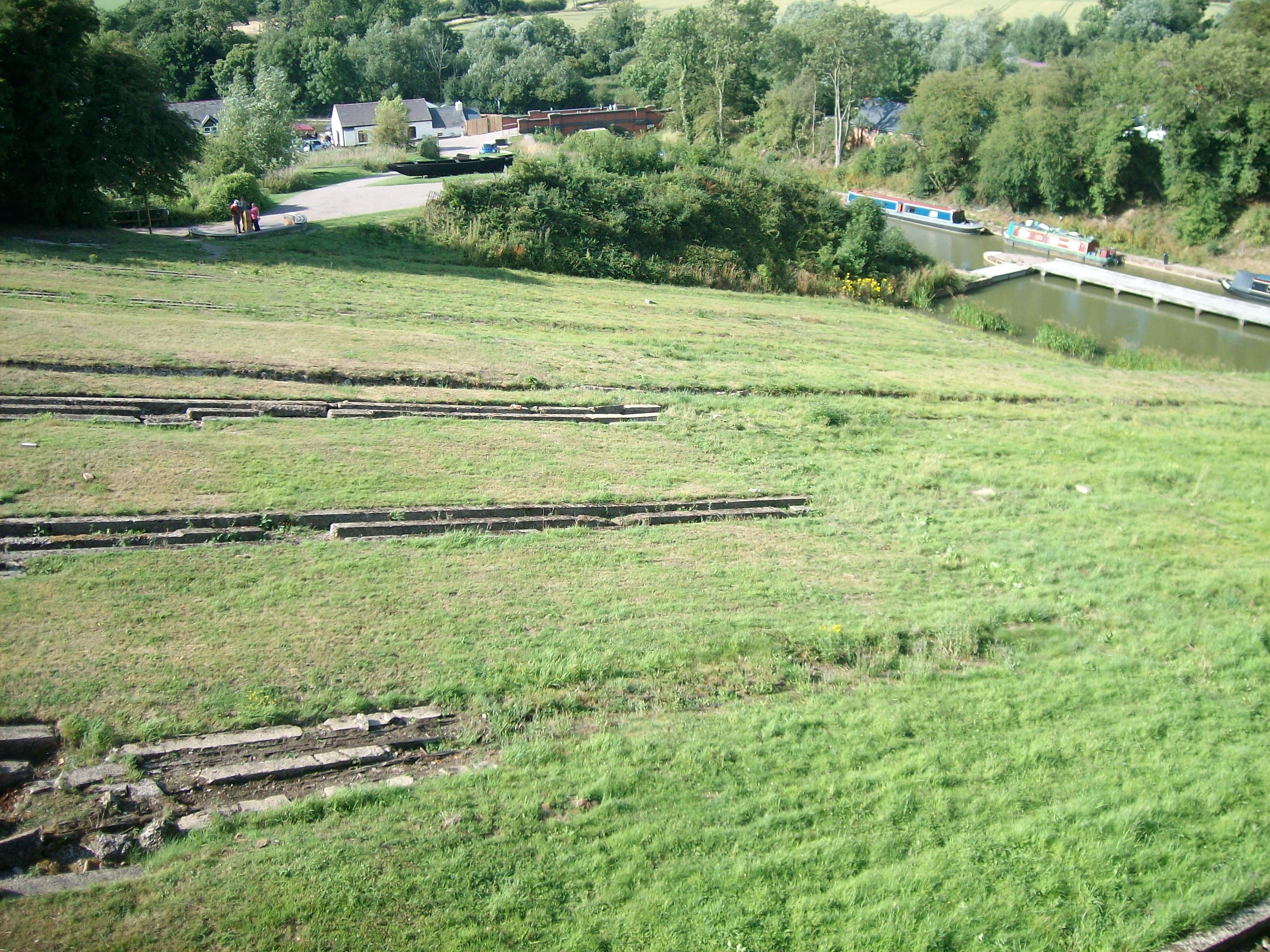
- Inclined Plane from the top

- Location within Leicestershire
- 52.5001°N 0.9817°W
- Type: canal inclined plane
- Location: Leicestershire, England

History
- Construction: 1898-1900
- Built for: Grand Union Canal
- Demolished: 1926

Site notes
- Elevation: 75 ft (23 m)
- Architect: Gordon Cale Thomas
- Restored: 2008
- Owner: Canal & River Trust

Scheduled monument
- Official name: Inclined Plane immediately east of Foxton Locks
- Designated: 24 January 1973
- Reference no.: 1018832

The Foxton Inclined Plane is a canal inclined plane on the Leicester line of the Grand Union Canal about 5 km (3.1 mi) west of the Leicestershire town of Market Harborough, named after the nearby village of Foxton.

The plane was built in 1900 as a solution to various operational restrictions imposed by the Foxton Lock flight. However, it was not a commercial success and only remained in full-time operation for ten years. The plane was dismantled in 1926. A project to re-create the plane commenced in the 2000s because the narrowbeam locks remain a bottleneck for leisure boat traffic.

== History ==
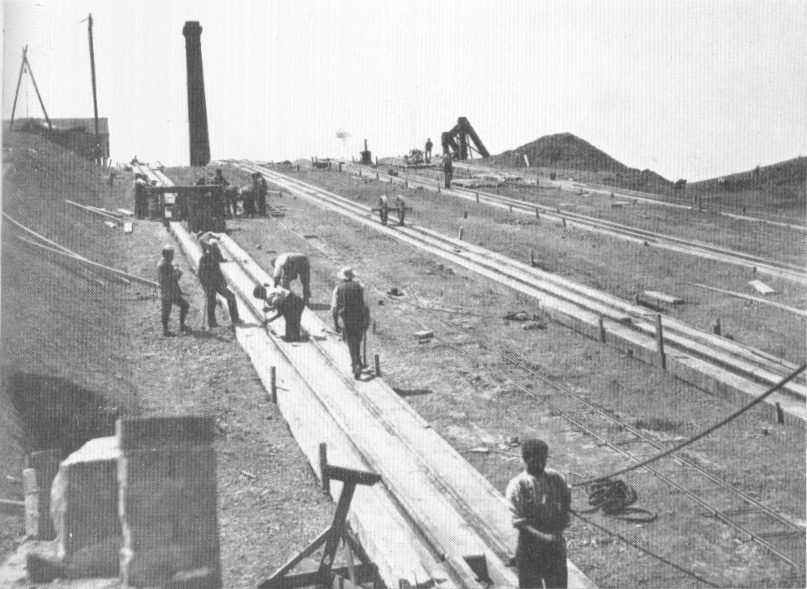
The inclined plane under construction in 1900.

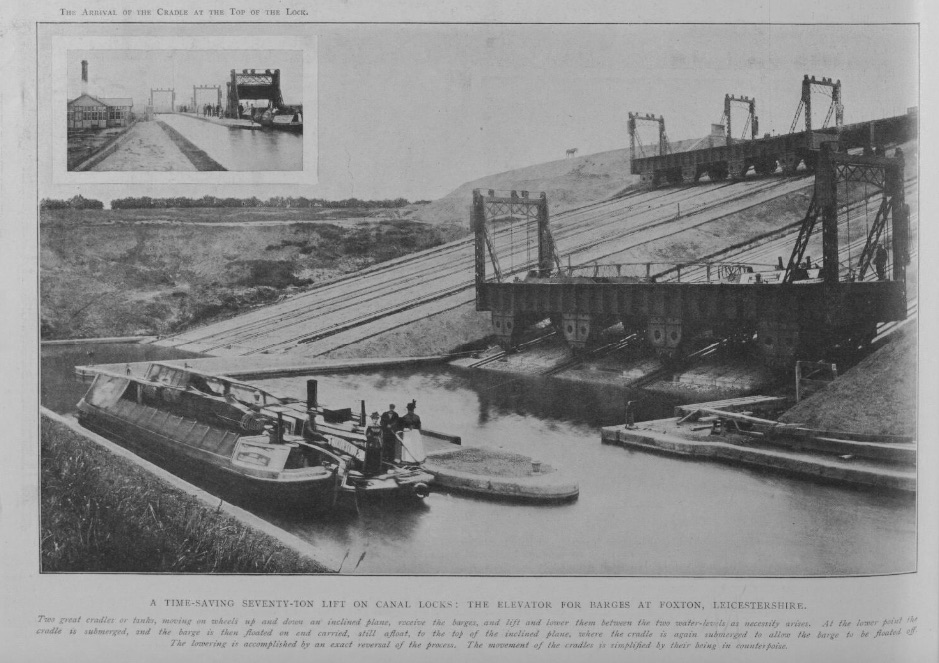
The inclined plane from the Illustrated London News of 19 December 1903

By 1897, the Grand Junction Canal Company had acquired several of the canals comprising the Leicester line, and was keen to meet demand from carriers seeking to use wider beam (14 ft) craft, rather than the traditional narrow beam boats, which were the only type the locks could accommodate.

Their solution was to build an inclined plane to the side of the locks. Initially, the company had planned for the plane to replace the locks, rather than having it act as a second, faster option. Construction began in 1898 and was finished by 10 July 1900.

The plane was designed by Gordon Cale Thomas, after a large-scale prototype was built at the company's Bulbourne yard and he had assessed the 75 ft (23 m) climb. It had two tanks, or caissons, each capable of holding two narrowboats or a barge. The water-holding caissons balanced each other. The caissons' vertical guillotine gates created a watertight seal. The lift was powered by a 25-horsepower (19 kW) stationary steam engine. The land for the plane was purchased for £1,595 and total expenses for the project came to £39,244 by 24 June 1900.

The inclined plane had a journey time of 12 minutes for two boats up and two down, compared with 1¼ hours through the lock system, thereby improving the speed of passage up the hill tremendously. During a 12-hour day, 6,000 tons (6,100 tonnes) of cargo could pass between the upper and lower level. Unlike the locks, where water flowed downhill every time a boat passed through, on the inclined plane almost the same amount of water goes up and down the hill. Only the displaced water is moved, thus saving a great deal of water and giving better control of this vital resource.

An initial problem with the plane was the stress placed on the tracks by the caissons. There was a plan to build a similar inclined plane at the Watford Locks at the southern end of the canal's summit level. However, this was never carried through (perhaps due to the low levels of traffic in the plane's first two years), and as the Watford Locks were never widened, the economic benefits of the plane could not be fully realised. The need to continually maintain a supply of steam for the plane's engine – in expectation of traffic – also proved to be a drain on finances. Thus, despite its obvious effectiveness, the Foxton Inclined Plane was mothballed in 1911 to save money. After that date it saw occasional use when the locks were undergoing maintenance.

In 1926, dismantling of the incline's machinery began, and it was sold for scrap in 1928 for a mere £250. That year the chimney on the engine house was demolished and its bricks used for various canal repairs. The mooring bollards from the incline can be found alongside the locks.

== Preservation ==
The Foxton Canal Museum is located in the former boiler house for the plane's steam engine. The museum covers the history of the locks and the plane, the lives of the canal workers, and other aspects of the local canal. There is also a collection of Measham pottery. The museum opened in 1989 and is accredited by the Museums, Libraries and Archives Council.

=== Restoration ===
The site of the Foxton Inclined Plane Boat Lift has been recognised as a scheduled monument and was on the Monuments at Risk Register. This recognition, together with the steady increase in leisure boating on British canals, means its restoration is now considered a key project in the development of the national waterway network. The cost of full restoration has been estimated at £9 million (in 2006).

Stage 1 of the project – the clearing of the site and restoration of the canal arms above and below the plane – was completed in 2008. A grant for £1.7 million was received from the Heritage Lottery Fund towards the £2.8 million cost of this first stage, and its successful completion resulted in the site being removed from the Monuments at Risk register.
