= Tardebigge Locks =

Canal locks in Worcestershire, England

Coordinates: 52.3214°N 2.0107°W

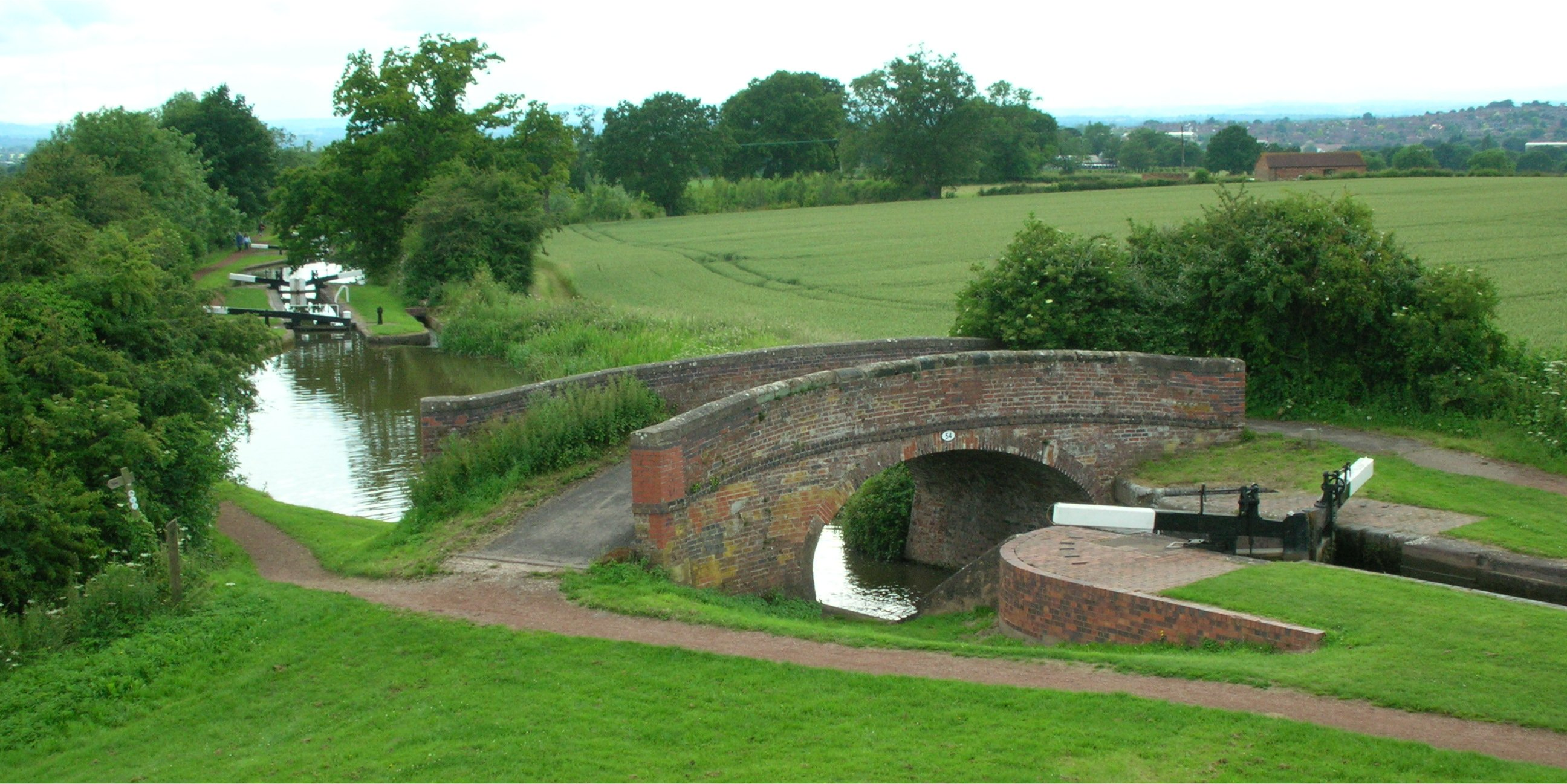
Some of the Tardebigge locks from the embankment of Tardebigge Reservoir

Tardebigge Locks or the Tardebigge Flight is the longest flight of locks in the UK, comprising 30 narrow locks on a two-and-a-quarter-mile (3.6 km) stretch of the Worcester and Birmingham Canal at Tardebigge, Worcestershire. It raises the waterway 220 feet (67 m), and lies between the Tardebigge tunnel (580 yards or 530 metres long) to the North and the Stoke Prior flight of six narrow locks to the South. The Tardebigge Engine House is also on this stretch.

== History ==
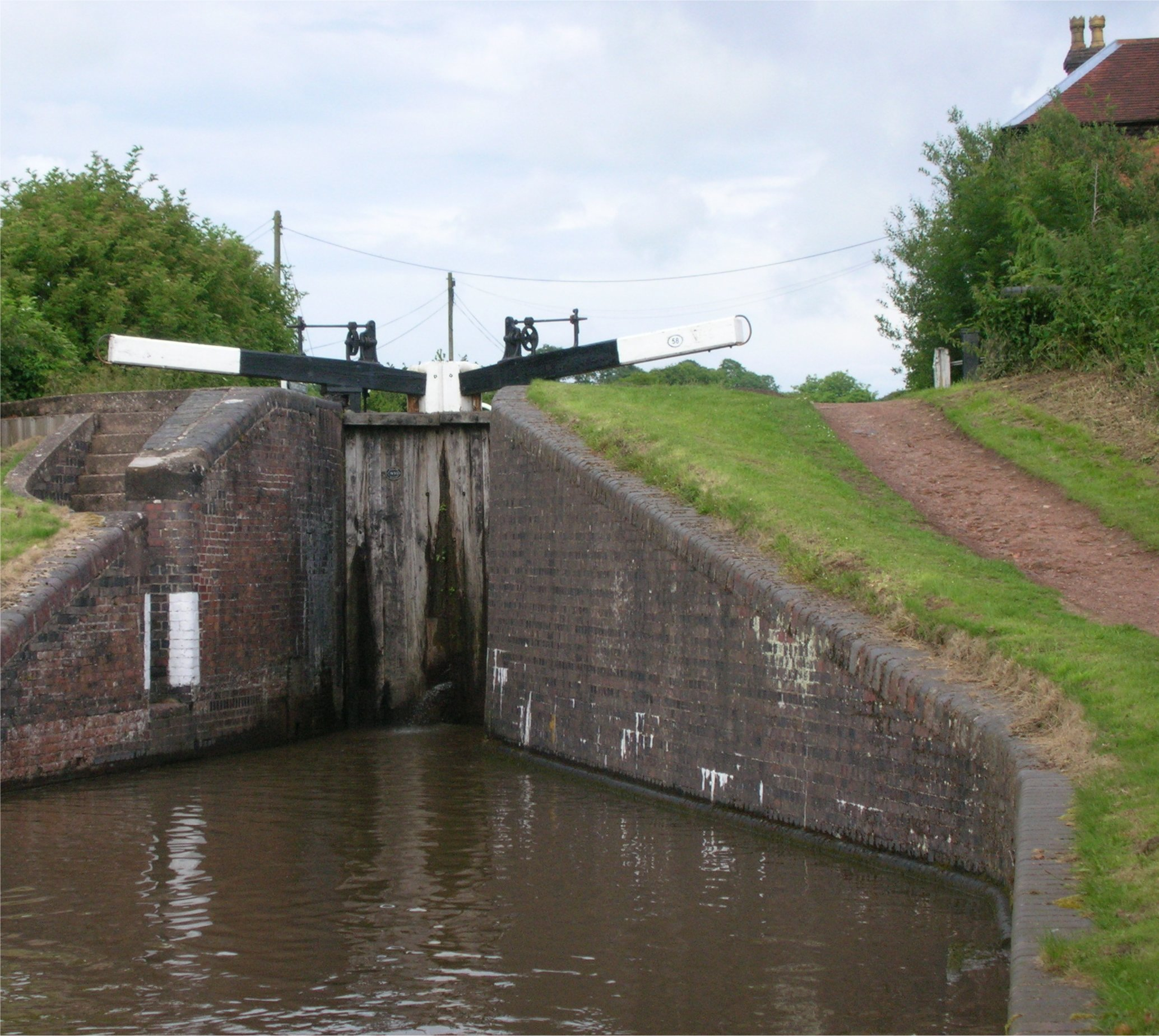
Tardebigge Top Lock, with a rise of 11 ft, and keeper's cottage

The top lock has a rise of eleven feet, unusually high for a single lock. This lock was built to replace an experimental vertical boat lift. The canal had been constructed and open from Birmingham to the wharf (now known as the Old Wharf) north of Brockhill Lane bridge by 30 March 1807 without the need for locks.

After the Old Wharf, the Tardebigge tunnel runs through the solid rock to the New Wharf, just above Lock 58, the topmost lock in the flight. The canal company was concerned with the expense of the 58 locks needed to take the canal down to the River Severn at Worcester.

The Tardebigge vertical lift was invented by John Woodhouse and installed at his own expense, with excavation and masonry provided by the company. Finished on 24 June 1808, it was housed in a covered shed and used a fixed counterweight of bricks, connected by a set of eight parallel chains and pulleys. Lifting was performed by two men using a windlass. The 64-ton wooden caisson (lifting chamber) was sealed at each end by guillotine gates, as was the lock chamber. It succeeded in lifting 110 boats in 12 hours but was considered too fragile for permanent use. The remainder of the canal was built with locks, and the lift was replaced by one in 1815. The lift mechanism has gone but the outline of its balancing pit may be seen near the lock keeper's cottage.

Close to lock number 57, the second from the top, is the Tardebigge Engine House, built to pump water up from Tardebigge Reservoir, which is about 50 feet (15 m) below the level of the top pound. The original steam engine has been removed, and the building has since been reused as a restaurant and night club at various times. It was converted into four residential apartments in 2012. The reservoir was one of a number of water supplies for the canal.

There is a detailed history by Revd Alan White in his book The Worcester and Birmingham Canal.

In 1992 lock 58 and several of the surrounding structures including the side pond and sluice, lock cottage and bridge were designated as listed buildings.

== Inland Waterways Association ==
At the top lock are plaques commemorating the 1945 founding of the Inland Waterways Association.

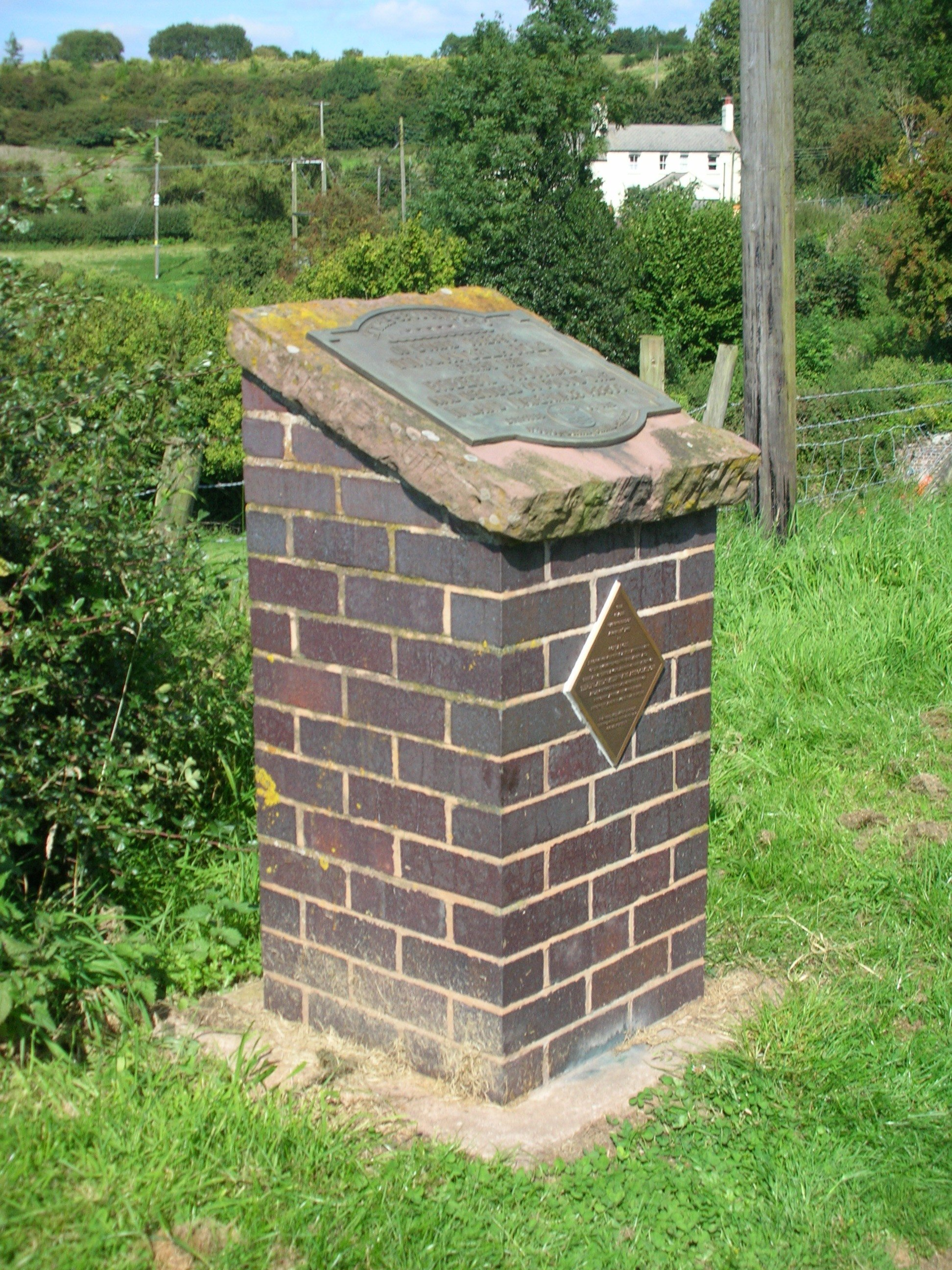
Inland Waterways Association plaques at Tardebigge top lock

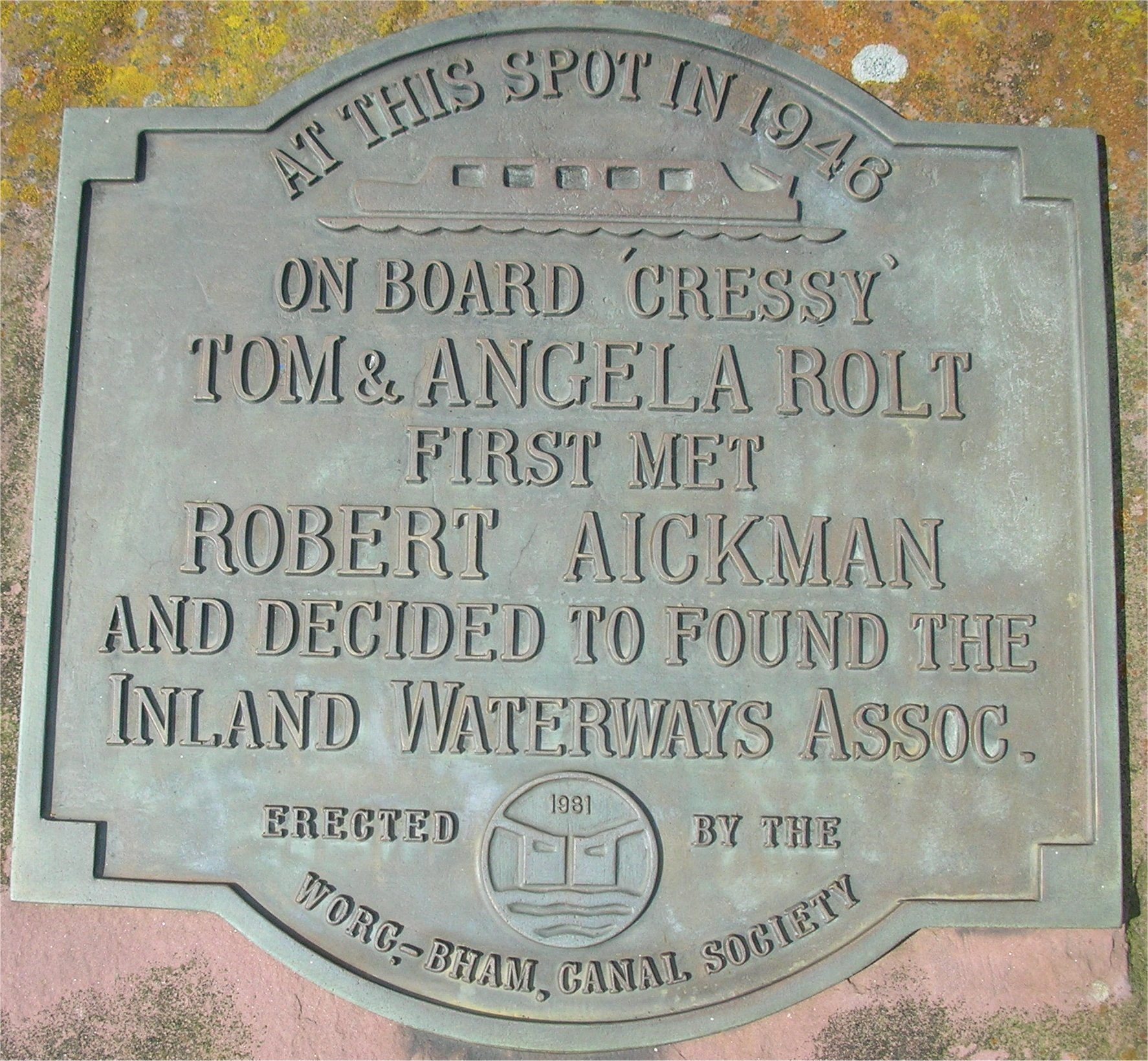
Inland Waterways Association plaque 1981 with incorrect date of founding

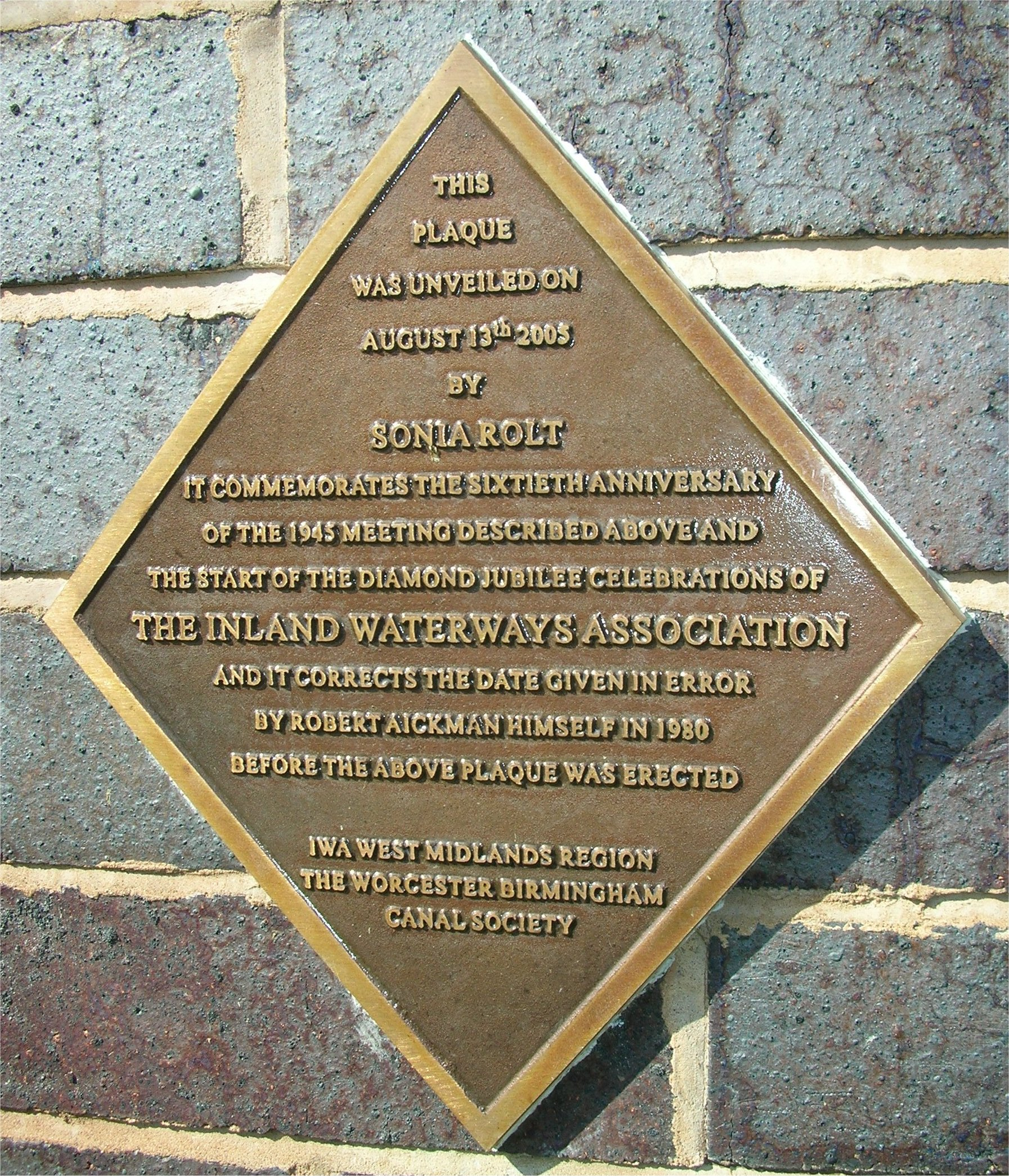
Inland Waterways Association plaque 2005 with correct date

== See also ==
- Bingley Five Rise Locks – in West Yorkshire
- Bingley Three Rise Locks – in West Yorkshire
- Caen Hill Locks – near Devizes, Wiltshire
- Foxton Locks – near Market Harborough, Leicestershire
- Fourteen Locks – near Newport, South Wales
- Hatton Locks – Warwickshire
- Watford Locks – Northamptonshire
