= Tutnall =

Village in Worcestershire, England

Coordinates: 52.33045°N 2.01843°W

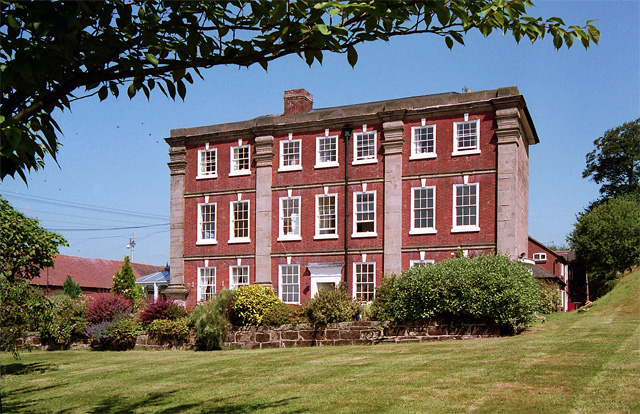
- Tutnall Hall

- Location within Worcestershire
- OS grid reference: SO988702
  - London: 117 miles (188 km)
- Civil parish: Tutnall and Cobley
- District: Bromsgrove
- Shire county: Worcestershire
- Region: West Midlands
- Country: England
- Sovereign state: United Kingdom
- Post town: BROMSGROVE
- Postcode district: B60
- Dialling code: 01527
- Police: West Mercia
- Fire: Hereford and Worcester
- Ambulance: West Midlands
- UK Parliament: Bromsgrove

Tutnall is a village in the Bromsgrove district of Worcestershire. It is in the civil parish of Tutnall and Cobley which has a population of 1,543. The A448 used to run through the centre of the village, though this is now bypassed by a modern dual carriageway. The name Tutnall derives from the Old English Tottahyll meaning 'Totta's hill'.
