= Watford Locks =

Canal inclined plane in Northamptonshire, England

Coordinates: 52.3140°N 1.1318°W

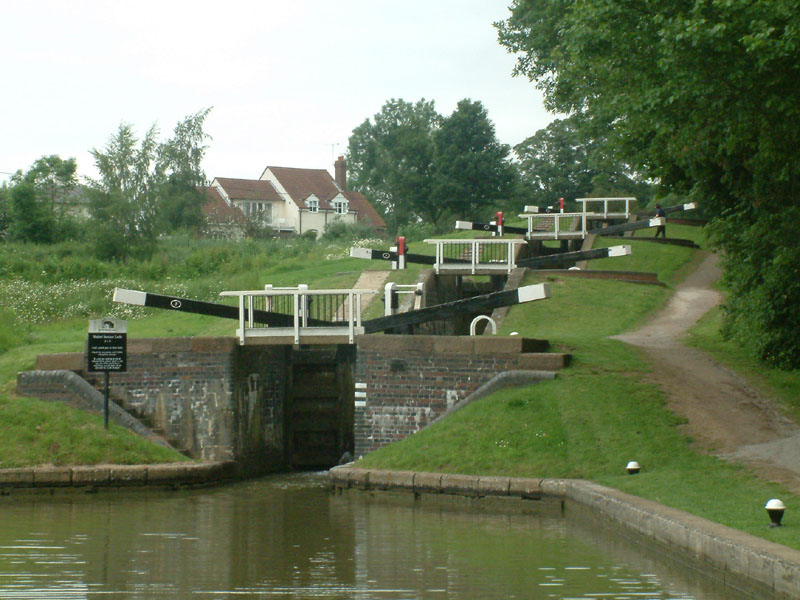
The 4-lock staircase, part of Watford Locks on the Grand Union Canal

Watford Locks (grid reference SP592688) is a group of seven locks on the Leicester Line of the Grand Union Canal, in Northamptonshire, England.

The locks are formed (looking from the south), of two single locks, a staircase of four, and a final single lock. Together they lift the canal 54 feet 1 inch (16.48 m) to the "Leicester Summit", which it maintains all the way to Foxton Locks. The four staircase locks are equipped with working side ponds which are used to save water.

The locks were built to carry narrowboats, and the system was opened in 1814. In the early 20th century there were plans to build an inclined plane similar to that at Foxton as part of a scheme to allow the passage of barges, but the plan was abandoned when the inclined plane at Foxton proved uneconomic.

When the Grand Union Canal was formed in 1929, there were further proposals to widen the flight as part of the modernisation going on elsewhere on the Grand Union's network, but these plans did not develop further.

The locks are hemmed in by the Roman Watling Street (now the A5 road), the M1 motorway, and the West Coast Main Line railway, which all fit through the narrow Watford Gap, between two hill systems.

The locks are supervised by volunteer lock keepers all year round, with the locks padlocked outside permitted hours. This is done to prevent problems arising from misuse and to ensure that queues are kept to the minimum. Boaters operate the locks themselves under the lock keeper's supervision. On arrival at the top or bottom boaters should report to the lock keeper to register their arrival before attempting to operate the flight. At busy times there can often be a delay of two hours or more but transit of the flight takes approximately 45 minutes; it is made quicker by the fact that the locks are narrow beam and the gates are light.

== See also ==
- Bingley Five Rise Locks in West Yorkshire
- Bingley Three Rise Locks in West Yorkshire
- Foxton Locks near Market Harborough, Leicestershire
- Caen Hill Locks near Devizes, Wiltshire
- Fourteen Locks near Newport, South Wales
- Tardebigge Locks near Bromsgrove, Worcestershire
