= Tardebigge =

Village in Worcestershire, England

Coordinates: 52.322°N 2.007°W

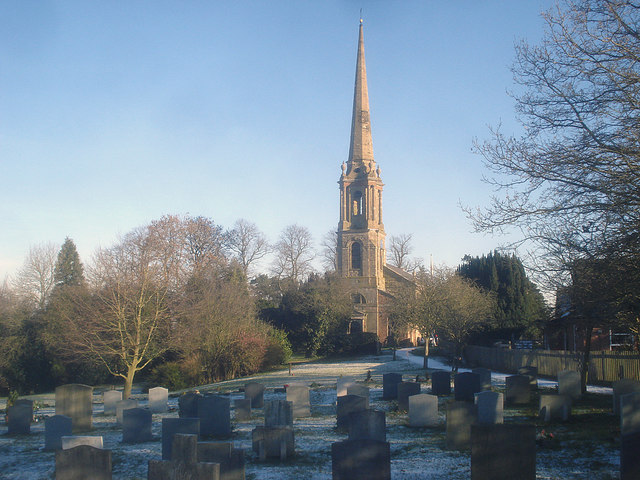
- St Bartholomew's church

- Location within Worcestershire
- Population: 3,549
- OS grid reference: SP000690
- Civil parish: Tutnall and Cobley
- District: Bromsgrove
- Shire county: Worcestershire
- Region: West Midlands
- Country: England
- Sovereign state: United Kingdom
- Post town: BROMSGROVE
- Postcode district: B60
- Dialling code: 01527
- Police: West Mercia
- Fire: Hereford and Worcester
- Ambulance: West Midlands
- UK Parliament: Bromsgrove

Tardebigge (/ˈtɑːrdibɪɡ/) is a village in Worcestershire, England. Its ward population was 3,549 in 2021.

The village is most famous for the Tardebigge Locks, a flight of 30 canal locks that raise the Worcester and Birmingham Canal over 220 feet (67 metres) over the Lickey Ridge. It lies in the county of Worcestershire, although it was also historically an exclave of Staffordshire or Warwickshire at different times in its history.

== Toponymy ==
Tyrde Bicgan is Old English for "big tower" or "tower on a hill," reflecting the position of the church. It was called Terdeberie in the Domesday Book and subsequently spelt Tardebigg, Tardebig, and Tarbick.

Eilert Ekwall, however, writes that the name Tærdebicga has no likely meaning in Old English or Celtic and calls it "unexplained".

== History ==
Tardebigge was once a much greater township, which included much of Redditch, including the modern day town-centre. Its name was recorded twice in a will as Anglo-Saxon æt Tærdebicgan.

Records of the parish begin in the late 10th century. Tardebigge was bought by the Dean of Worcester for his Church from King Ethelred the Unready. In the later Early Middle Ages there were battles fought between Ethelred's son Edmund Ironside and Cnut the Dane.

In the 12th century, the parish was granted to Bordesley Abbey. For three hundred years the area remained in the Church's possession. In 1538 the Roman Catholic Church was disestablished by King Henry VIII, and the area became the possession of The Crown, until under an arrangement with Henry, the possessions of Bordesley Abbey passed to Andrew Lord Windsor, and therefore to the stewardship of the Earl of Plymouth at adjacent Hewell Grange. The land was gradually managed and sold off by the Earl; it was not until the mid 19th century that the parish of Tardebigge began to dissolve and the modern boundaries began to appear.

== St Bartholomew's Church ==
The local parish church of St Bartholomew by Francis Hiorne of 1777 contains an impressive monument to Sir Thomas Cookes, 2nd Baronet, the benefactor of Worcester College, Oxford, as well as several monuments to the Earls of Plymouth who lived at adjacent Hewell Grange. Several members of the earls' families are buried in the cemetery of St Bartholomew's, including Robert Windsor-Clive, 1st Earl of Plymouth, GBE, CB, PC (1857–1923), and his parents-in-law, Sir Augustus Berkeley Paget, GCB (1823–1896), and Walburga, Lady Paget (1839–1929), the diarist, writer and friend of Queen Victoria.

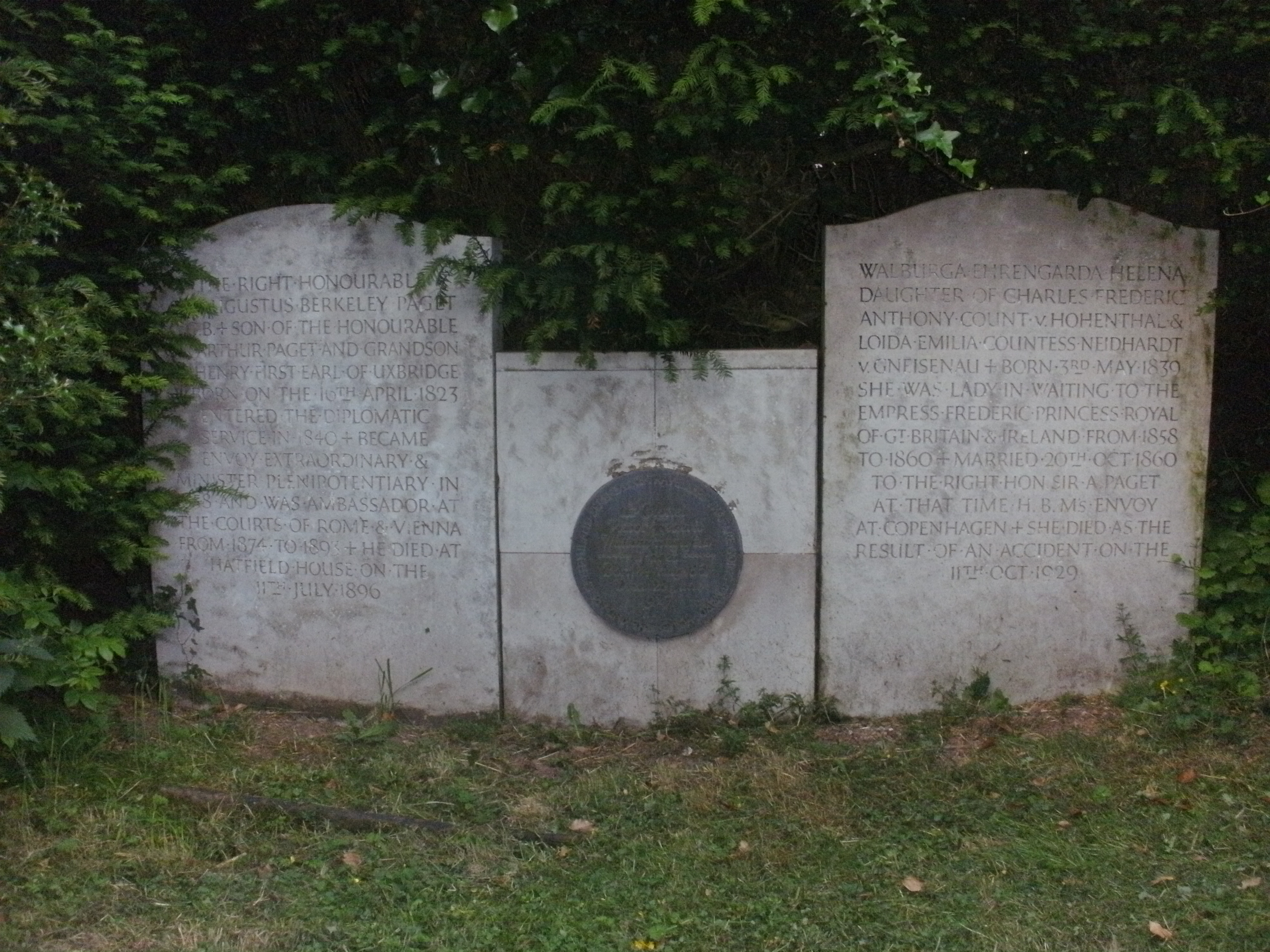
Tardebigge cemetery, Paget family plot

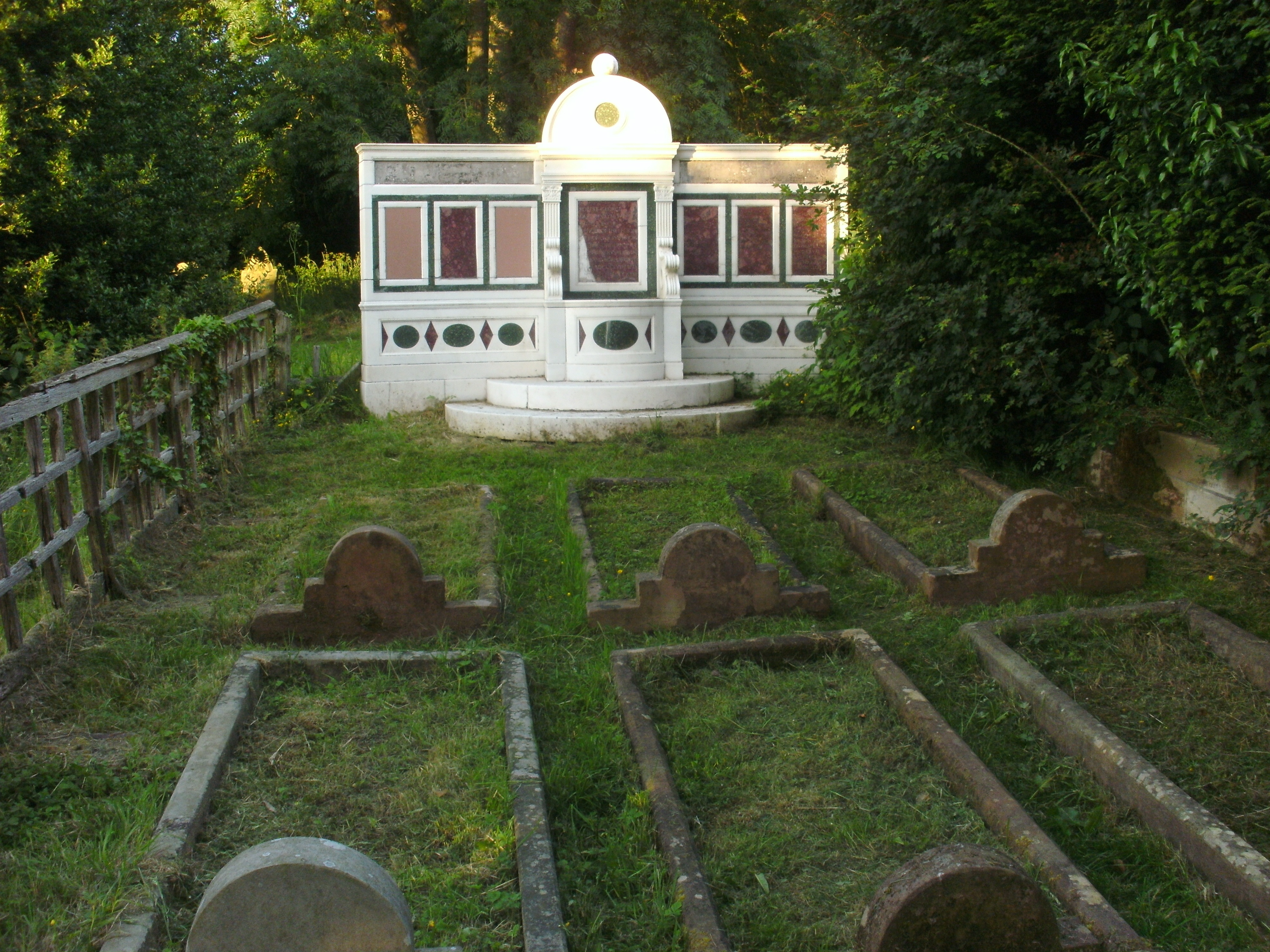
Tardebigge cemetery, Earl of Plymouth family plot

== Economy ==
=== Worcester and Birmingham Canal ===
The village contains the Tardebigge Locks, a flight of 36 canal locks that raise the Worcester and Birmingham Canal over 220 feet (67 metres) over the Lickey Ridge.

=== Building material ===
The area was well known for the manufacture of bricks during the 18th and 19th century. There is little industry in the village remaining, apart from minor canal narrow boat repairing works.

=== Fruit and cider ===
The area become predominantly a fruit growing area until the end of the 20th century with the famous Tardebigge orchards supplying produce to the Birmingham conurbation. Most of these orchards were grubbed up in the 1970s and 1980s with the last orchard being removed in 2000, when cheaper imported fruit replaced the home grown produce. The only orchard planted recently is the small orchard of Tardebigge Cider.

Tardebigge Cider is a craft cider maker based in Tutnall, about one mile (1.5 kilometres) from the church. The cidermaker Steve Cooper planted a mixed orchard of traditional apple varieties of about 100 trees in 1995. The varieties are primarily Dabinett, Michelin, and Harry Masters Jersey with a few culinary varieties included along with some pears, Moorcroft and Worcester Black. The fruit from these trees and other Worcestershire fruit go to make about 1,000–1,500 imperial gallons (4,500–6,800 litres) of high quality cider which is only sold locally.

=== Local Enterprise ===
For many years, Tardebigge has been home to The Barns Rural Business Park, which is a collection of many local SME businesses. There are a variety of businesses, including industrial and manufacturing, artists, beauty and holistic, as well as an on-site tea room.

== Notable people ==
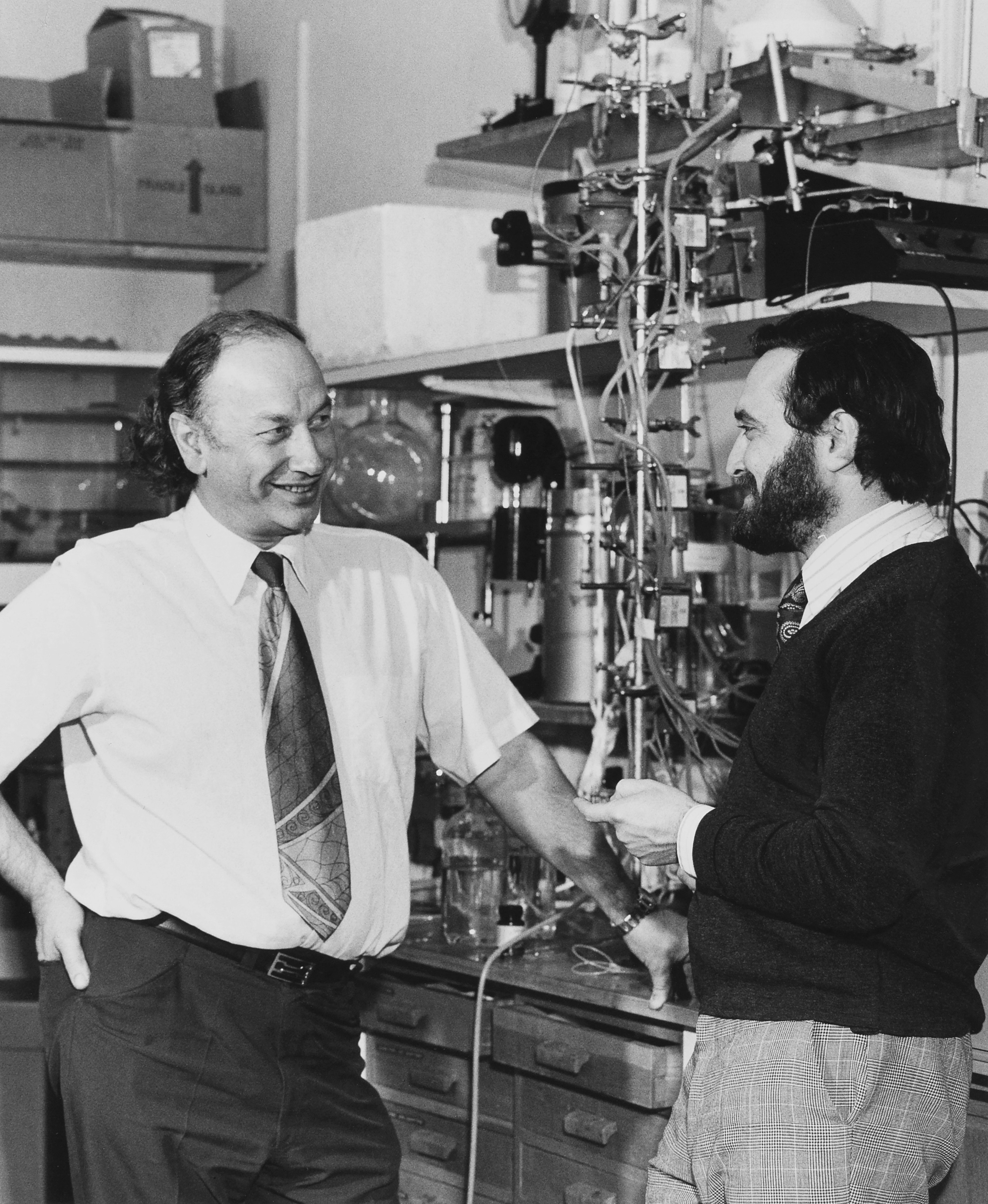
John Vane (left) and Salvador Moncada in the 1960s

- Sir Thomas Cookes (1648–1701), benefactor of Worcester College, Oxford; buried at Tardebigge
- Sir Humphrey Mackworth (1657–1727), industrialist; landowner in Tardebigge
- Other Lewis Windsor, 4th Earl of Plymouth (1731–1771), nobleman and landowner; buried at Tardebigge
- Other Archer Windsor, 6th Earl of Plymouth (1789–1833), nobleman, landowner in Tardebigge
- Robert Windsor-Clive, 1st Earl of Plymouth (1857–1923), buried at Tardebigge
- Sir Augustus Paget (1823–1896), diplomat; buried at Tardebigge
- Walburga, Lady Paget (1839–1929), diarist and friend of Queen Victoria; buried at Tardebigge
- Sir John Vane (1927–2004), pharmacologist and Nobel Laureate in Medicine (1982); born in Tardebigge

== See also ==
- Tardebigge Engine House
- Hewell (HM Prison)
