= Worcester and Birmingham Canal =

Canal in the United Kingdom

Coordinates: 52.4769°N 1.9090°W

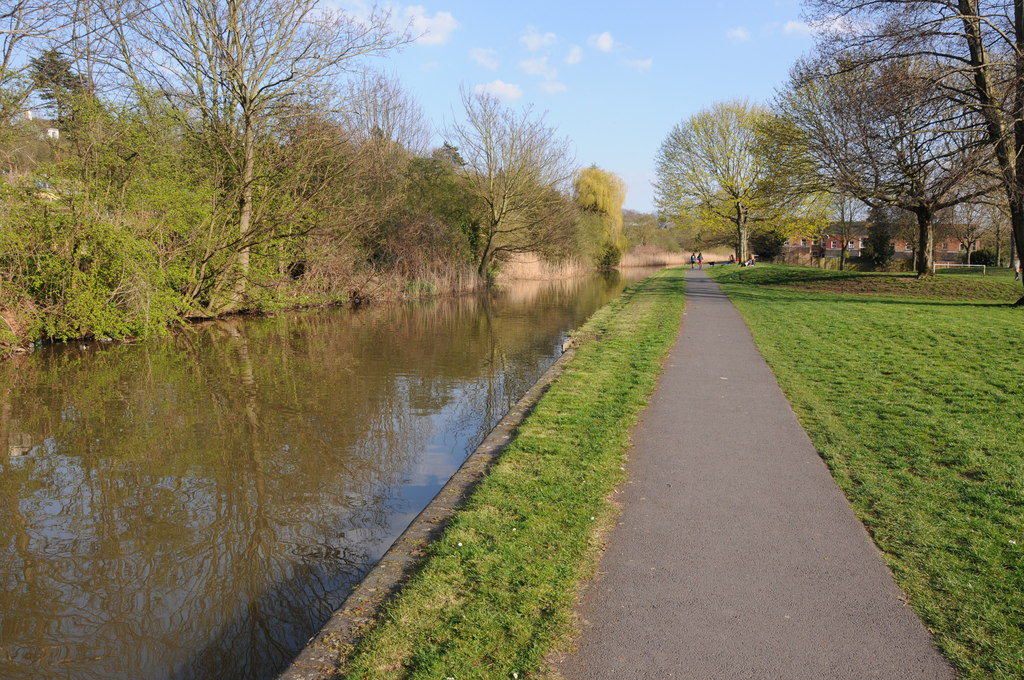
- View of the canal in Worcester
- Interactive map of Worcester and Birmingham Canal

Specifications
- Locks: 58
- Status: Navigable

History
- Date of act: 1791

Geography
- Connects to: BCN Main Line; River Severn

The Worcester and Birmingham Canal is a canal linking Birmingham and Worcester in England. It starts in Worcester, as an 'offshoot' of the River Severn (just after the river lock) and ends in Gas Street Basin in Birmingham. It is 29 miles (47 km) long. There are 58 locks in total on the canal, including the 30 Tardebigge Locks, one of the longest lock flights in Europe. The canal climbs 428 feet (130 m) from Worcester to Birmingham.

The canal also has connections with the Stratford-upon-Avon Canal, and the restored Droitwich Canal, it historically linked to the Dudley Canal Line No 2, until the route through the Lapal Tunnel was abandoned in 1917.

== History ==
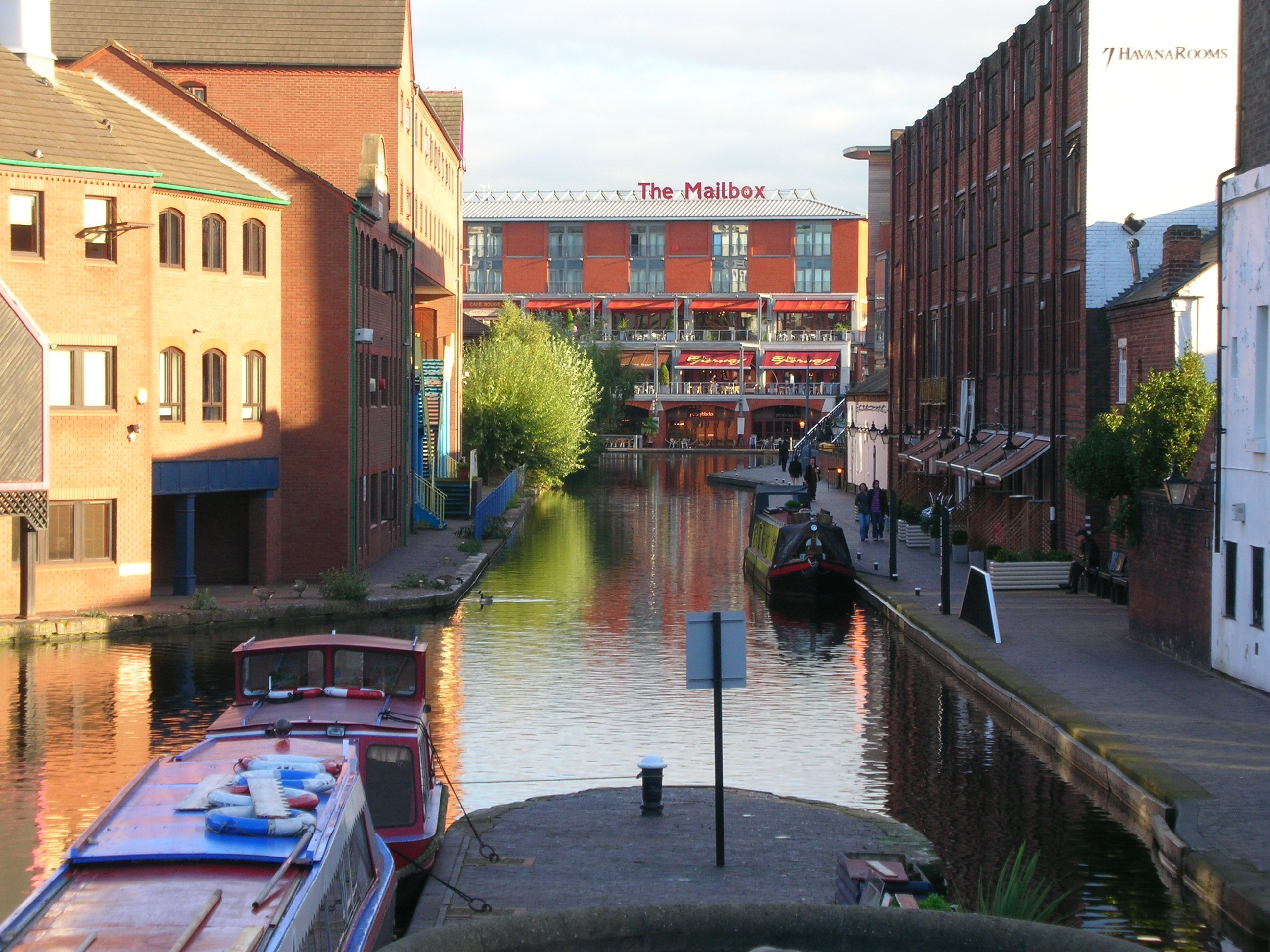
The start of the Worcester and Birmingham Canal at Gas Street Basin, looking south-east, towards The Mailbox

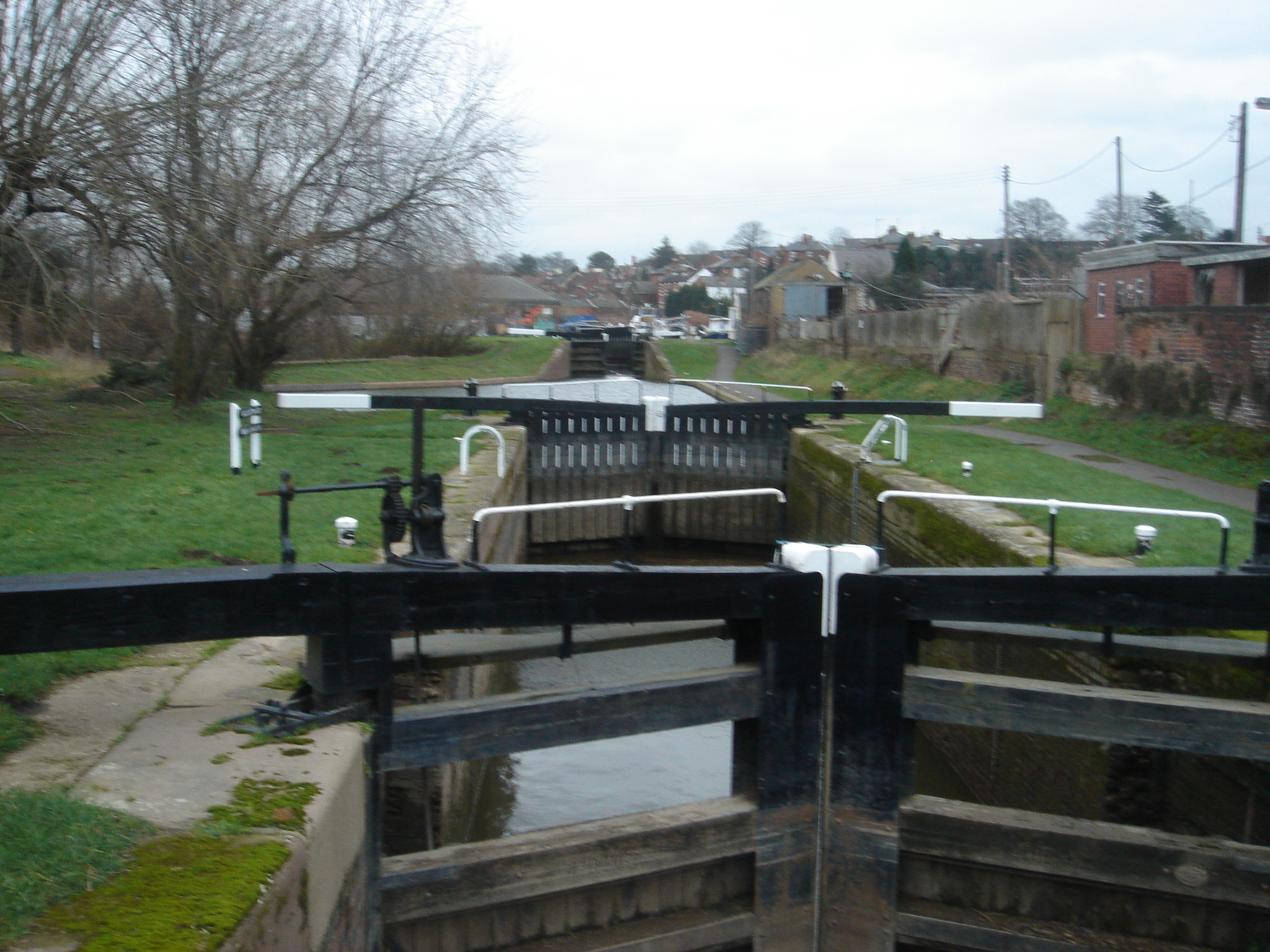
Worcester and Birmingham Canal locks. Feb. 2007

Worcester and Birmingham Canal Act 1791
- Act of Parliament
- Parliament of Great Britain
- Long title: An Act for making and maintaining a Navigable Canal from or from near to the Town of Birmingham, in the County of Warwick, to communicate with the River Severn, near to the City of Worcester.
- Citation: 31 Geo. 3. c. 59
- Territorial extent: Great Britain

Dates
- Royal assent: 10 June 1791
- Commencement: 10 August 1790 (Note: Start of session.)
Other legislation
Amended by	Worcester and Birmingham Canal Act 1798; Worcester and Birmingham Canal Act 1804; Worcester and Birmingham Canal Act 1808

Status: Amended

Text of statute as originally enacted

Worcester and Birmingham Canal Act 1798
- Act of Parliament
- Parliament of Great Britain
- Long title: An act for amending and enlarging the powers of an act, passed in the thirty-first year of the reign of his present Majesty, intituled, "An act for making and maintaining a navigable canal from, or from near to, the town of Birmingham in the county of Warwick, to communicate with the river Severn, near to the city of Worcester."
- Citation: 38 Geo. 3. c. xxxi
- Territorial extent: Great Britain

Dates
- Royal assent: 26 May 1798
- Commencement: 26 May 1798 (Note: The Acts of Parliament (Commencement) Act 1793.)
Other legislation
Amends	Worcester and Birmingham Canal Act 1791
Amended by	Worcester and Birmingham Canal Act 1804; Worcester and Birmingham Canal Act 1808; Worcester and Birmingham Canal Navigation Act 1815; Gloucester and Berkeley Canal Act 1874; Sharpness Docks and Gloucester and Birmingham Navigation Act 1935

Status: Amended

Text of statute as originally enacted

Worcester and Birmingham Canal Act 1804
- Act of Parliament
- Parliament of the United Kingdom
- Long title: An Act for enabling the company of proprietors of the Worcester and Birmingham canal navigation to raise money to discharge their debts, and to complete the said canal navigation, and for amending the several acts passed for making the said canal navigation.
- Citation: 44 Geo. 3. c. xxxv
- Territorial extent: United Kingdom

Dates
- Royal assent: 16 May 1804
- Commencement: 16 May 1804
Other legislation
Amends	Worcester and Birmingham Canal Act 1791; Worcester and Birmingham Canal Act 1798; Grand Junction Canal Act 1798
Amended by	Worcester and Birmingham Canal Act 1808; Sharpness Docks and Gloucester and Birmingham Navigation Act 1935

Text of statute as originally enacted

Worcester and Birmingham Canal Act 1808
- Act of Parliament
- Parliament of the United Kingdom
- Long title: An Act to amend and enlarge the Powers of the several Acts relating to the Worcester and Birmingham Canal Navigation.
- Citation: 48 Geo. 3. c. xlix
- Territorial extent: United Kingdom

Dates
- Royal assent: 27 May 1808
- Commencement: 27 May 1808
Other legislation
Amends	Worcester and Birmingham Canal Act 1791; Worcester and Birmingham Canal Act 1798; Worcester and Birmingham Canal Act 1804

Status: Current legislation

Text of statute as originally enacted

Worcester and Birmingham Canal Navigation Act 1815
- Act of Parliament
- Parliament of the United Kingdom
- Long title: An Act for enabling the Company of Proprietors of the Worcester and Birmingham Canal Navigation to complete and extend their Works, and for better supplying the said Canal with Water; and also for vesting in Trustees for the said Company of Proprietors, His Majesty's Right and Interest in certain Lands and Hereditaments in the Parishes of King's Norton and Northfield, in the County of Worcester, forfeited to The Crown.
- Citation: 55 Geo. 3. c. lxvi
- Territorial extent: United Kingdom

Dates
- Royal assent: 7 June 1815
- Commencement: 7 June 1815
Other legislation
Amends	Worcester and Birmingham Canal Act 1798
Amended by	Gloucester and Berkeley Canal Act 1874

Status: Amended

Text of statute as originally enacted

The parliamentary bill permitting its construction was passed in 1791 as the Worcester and Birmingham Canal Act 1791 (31 Geo. 3. c. 59) empowering the company to raise £180,000 (equivalent to £23.5 million in 2025), through 1,800 shares at a cost of £100 each. It also allowed them to raise a further £70,000, if needed, amongst themselves or by the mortgage of tolls and rates. The act also permitted the company to allow landowners on the line to build wharfs and wharfhouse, and if they refuse to, the company are allowed to if needed. A further act of Parliament, the Worcester and Birmingham Canal Act 1798 (38 Geo. 3. c. xxxi), authorised the raising of £149,929 amongst themselves or through the creation of new shares. However, the company were unable to raise the full amount of money authorised by the second act, and so another, the Worcester and Birmingham Canal Act 1804 (44 Geo. 3. c. xxxv), was passed allowing them to raise £49,680. Another act, the Worcester and Birmingham Canal Act 1808 (48 Geo. 3. c. xlix) was passed to obtain more money. This act empowered the company to raise £168,000 through the creation of 4,200 shares at £40 each. A final act, the Worcester and Birmingham Canal Navigation Act 1815 (55 Geo. 3. c. lxvi), was passed after the company had purchased land for reservoirs, which was not permitted in the previous acts. The act permitted the company to sell the land and to pay a debt of £29,096 (equivalent to £2.24 million in 2025), to the treasurers by 29 September 1815 as well, otherwise it would be taken out of the proceeds raised from selling the land.

The canal was surveyed by Josiah Clowes and John Snape. Its engineers changed often, and included Thomas Cartwright, John Woodhouse and William Crosley.

Construction of a double barge-width (14 ft) canal began in 1792 from the Birmingham end, but progressed slowly. Selly Oak was reached in October 1795 and Kings Norton Junction by May 1796, meeting the new Stratford-upon-Avon Canal which had by then reached Hockley Heath. By March 1797 the 2,726-yard (2,493 m) Wast Hills Tunnel was open and the canal was trading to Hopwood. In 1807 the canal reached Tardebigge without the use of locks. From Worcester Bar to Tardebigge top lock, the canal is at the 453 ft Birmingham Level. The cost of building 14-foot (4.3 m) locks was too great so the 56 locks down to Worcester were built to the narrow 7-foot (2.1 m) specification, with the final two locks connecting to the Severn in Worcester being 14-foot (4.3 m) to allow river craft access to Diglis Basin.

The final 16 miles (26 km) was opened in December 1815. Plans to construct basins at Lowesmoor and Diglis were carried out eventually.

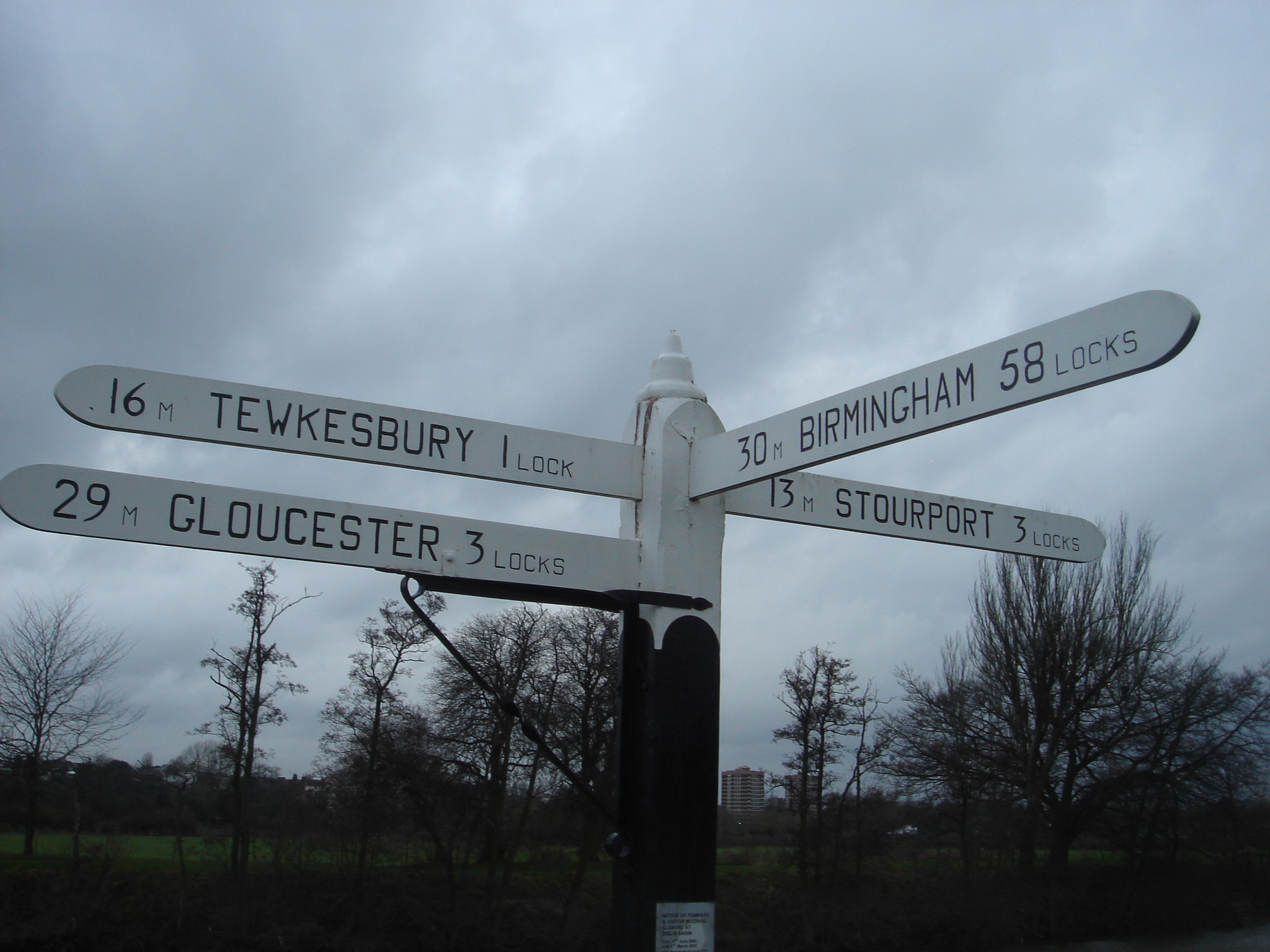
Worcester and Birmingham Canal signpost.

The Dudley Canal Line No 2 was built through the Lapal Tunnel to meet the canal at Selly Oak in 1798. After repeated collapses, the tunnel was finally abandoned in 1917 leaving a short stretch navigable between Selly Oak and a brick works at California until 1953, after which it was drained and filled in. A campaign group, the Lapal Canal Trust, is working to restore it, with a diversion around the tunnel.

A major user of the canal was the Cadbury chocolate factories at Bournville and Blackpole, Worcester.

== Birmingham terminus ==
For twenty years direct connection to the Birmingham Canal Navigations (BCN) was prevented by the Worcester Bar, a physical barrier at Gas Street Basin, Birmingham designed so that the BCN would not lose water to the Worcester and Birmingham. Cargoes had to be laboriously manhandled between boats on either side. The Birmingham Canal Navigations and Worcester and Birmingham Canal Navigable Communication Act 1815 (55 Geo. 3. c. xl) allowed the creation of a stop lock and the bar was breached. The Worcester and Birmingham raised their water level by six inches to minimise water loss and today the two pairs of lock gates have been removed. There were separate toll offices either side of the bar for the two canal companies. The bar still exists, with boats moored to both sides of it.

The commercial terminus in Birmingham was Worcester Wharf, a large complex extending from the bar along Bridge Street, Gas Street and Granville Street. Part of it now forms a water front to The Mailbox shopping and residential complex.

== Birmingham West Suburban Railway ==
After the development of the new Birmingham New Street, a group of local business men noticed the resultant need for additional railway capacity south, through what were the under developed suburbs of south Birmingham and villages of northern Worcestershire. They therefore proposed development of a new branch railway, following the route of the Worcester and Birmingham Canal south to the Birmingham and Gloucester Railway to allow access to their new station at Kings Norton.

Needing finance for construction of the BWSR, the newly formed Midland Railway became involved in the deal. An eventual agreement was reached with the then loss making canal company, who would be paid a rent for the land, which later became a guarantee of a 1% share dividend. The payments to the canal company and development began in 1873, and the line was running by 1875. Originally the railway terminated at Granville Street station and later the Central Goods station and goods yard through a tunnel under the canal, both stations now demolished and built upon.

Today it forms a large part of the southern section of the Cross-City Line which runs in another tunnel under the canal adjacent to the Holliday Street Aqueduct.

== Today ==
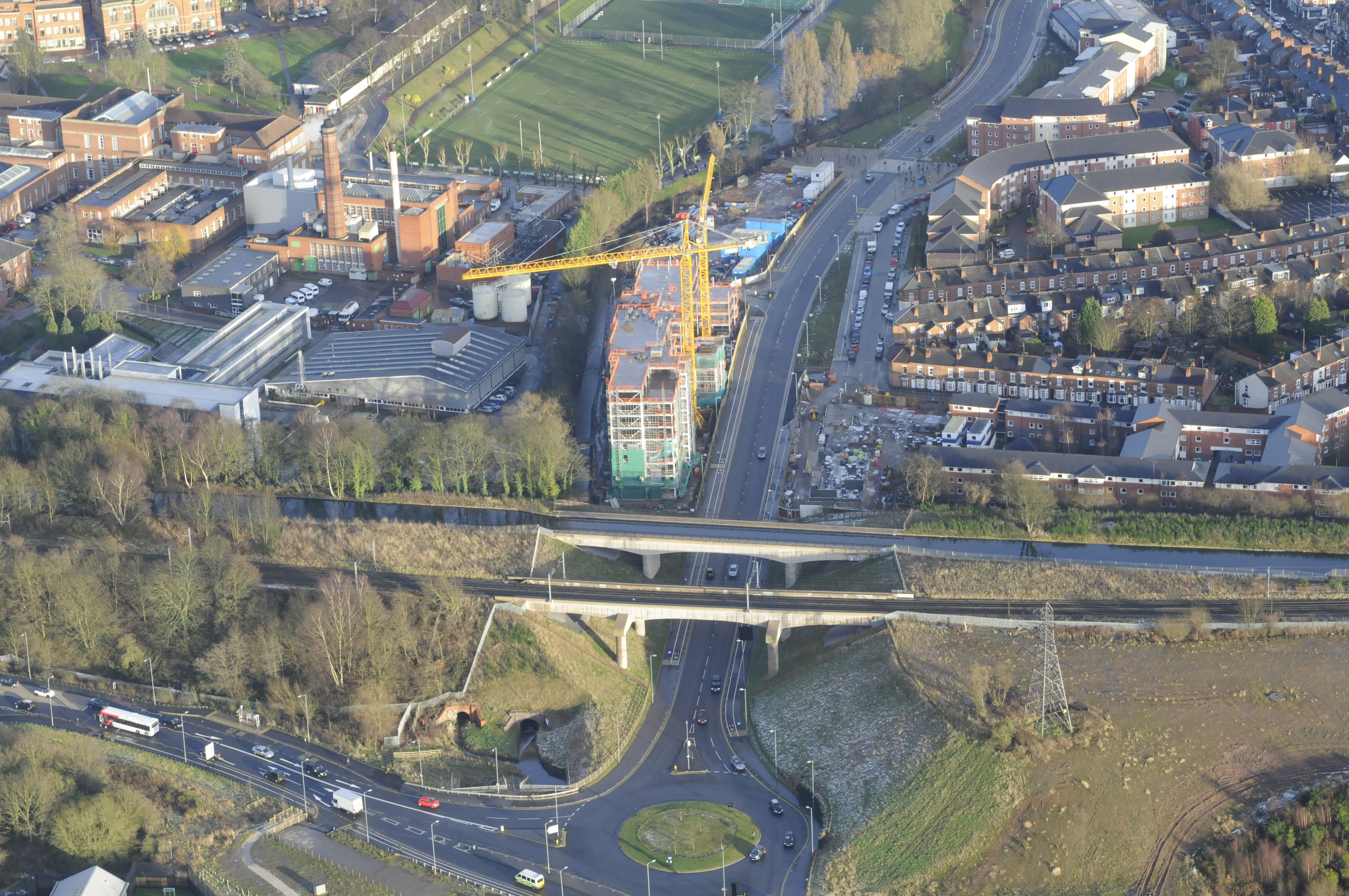
Aerial view of the new railway bridge (nearest to camera) and Ariel Aqueduct, over the diverted A38, taken in January 2013

At Selly Oak, a new aqueduct, the Ariel Aqueduct (named after the former Ariel Motorcycles factory nearby), was constructed in 2011 to carry the canal over a new section of the A38.

The canal is popular for leisure and has narrowboat hire centres at Alvechurch, Worcester, Tardebigge, Dunhampstead and Stoke Prior.

The canal forms part of the Stourport Ring, a popular cruising circuit for holiday boating. The ring takes in parts of four waterways, is 74 miles (119 km) long, and includes 105 locks. Another ring which includes the Worcester and Birmingham Canal is the Avon Ring, which is 109 miles (175 km) long with 129 locks, and also includes parts of four waterways.

== Detailed map ==
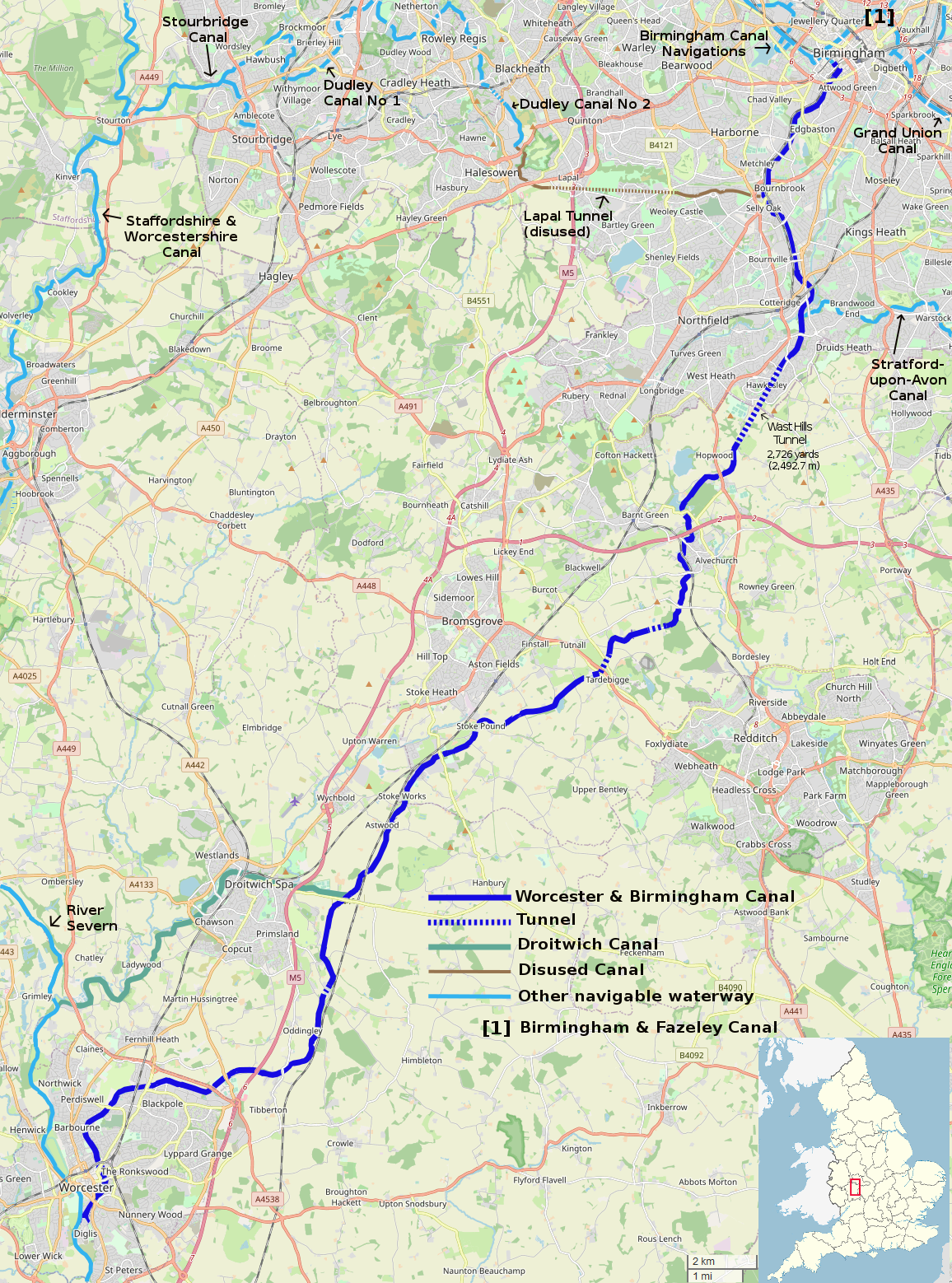
Detailed map of canal and connections

== See also ==
- Canals of Great Britain
- History of the British canal system
- Bittell Reservoirs
- Tardebigge Engine House
- Wychall Reservoir
