= Narrowboat =

Type of British canal boat

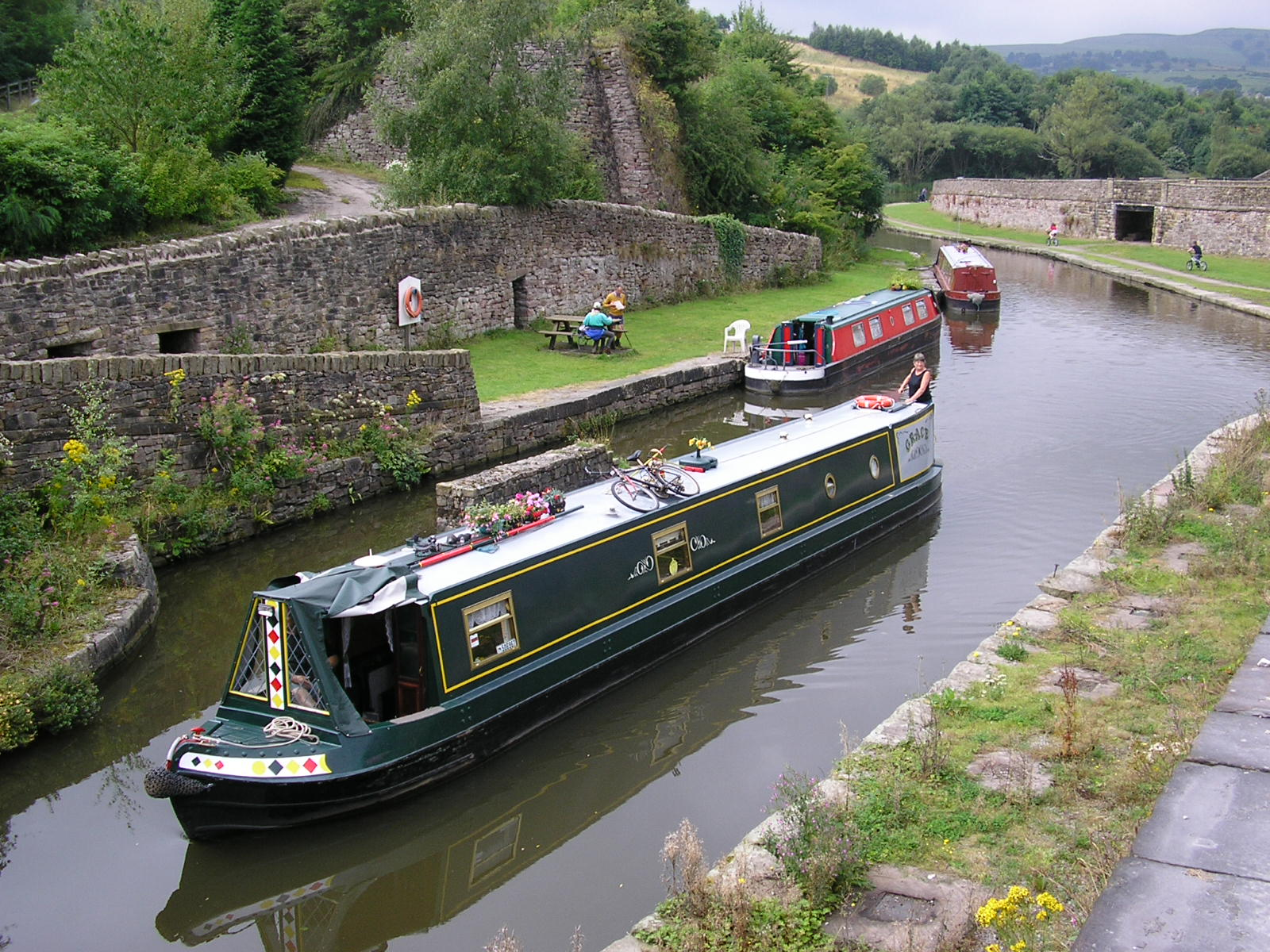
Modern narrowboats for leisure cruising, Bugsworth Basin, Buxworth, Derbyshire, England

A narrowboat is a particular type of barge, built to fit the narrow locks of the United Kingdom. The UK's canal system provided a nationwide transport network during the Industrial Revolution, but with the advent of the railways, commercial canal traffic gradually diminished and the last regular long-distance transportation of goods by canal had virtually disappeared by 1970. However, some commercial traffic continued. From the 1970s onward narrowboats were gradually being converted into permanent residences or as holiday lettings. Currently, about 8,580 narrowboats are registered as 'permanent homes' on Britain's waterway system and represent a growing alternative community living on semi-permanent moorings or continuously cruising.

For any boat to enter a narrow lock, it must be under 7 feet (2.13 m) wide, so most narrowboats are nominally 6 feet 10 inches (2.08 m) wide. A narrowboat's maximum length is generally 72 feet (21.95 m), as anything longer will be unable to navigate much of the British canal network, because the nominal maximum length of locks is 75 feet (22.86 m). Some locks are shorter than 72 feet (21.95 m), so to access the entire canal network the maximum length is 57 feet (17.37 m). Exterior height is usually 6 foot 10 inch (2.08 m). Narrowboats often have a draught of roughly 2 feet to 2 feet 10 inches (0.6m-0.8m) below the waterline, leaving roughly 4 feet to 4 feet 10 inches (1.21m-1.47m) above the water line.

The first narrow boats played a key role in the economic changes of the British Industrial Revolution. They were wooden boats drawn by a horse walking on the canal towpath led by a crew member. Horses were gradually replaced by steam and then diesel engines. By the end of the 19th century, it was common practice to paint roses and castles on narrowboats and their fixtures and fittings. This tradition has continued into the 21st century, but not all narrowboats have such decorations.

Modern narrowboats are commonly used for holidays, weekend breaks, touring, or as permanent or part-time residences. They commonly have steel hulls and a steel superstructure. The hull's flat base is usually 10mm thick, the hull sides 6-8mm, the cabin sides 6mm, and the roof 4-6mm. The numbers of boats have been rising, with the number of licensed boats (not all of them narrowboats) on canals and rivers managed by the Canal & River Trust (CRT) estimated at 27,000 in 2006; by 2019, this had risen to 34,367. Although a small number of steel narrowboats are steered using a wheel in a central cockpit, most narrowboats' steering is by a tiller on the stern. There are three major configurations for the stern: traditional stern, cruiser stern and semi-traditional stern.

== Terminology ==
The narrowboat (one word) definition in the Oxford English Dictionary is:

A British canal boat of traditional long, narrow design, steered with a tiller; spec. one not exceeding 7 feet (approx. 2.1 metres) in width or 72 feet (approx. 21.9 metres) in length

Earlier quotations listed use the term narrow boat, with the most recent, a quotation from an advertisement in Canal Boat & Inland Waterways in 1998, using narrowboat.

The single word narrowboat has been adopted by authorities such as the Canal and River Trust, Scottish Canals and the authoritative magazine Waterways World to refer to all boats built in the style and tradition of commercial boats that were able to fit in the narrow canal locks.

Although some narrowboats are built to a design based on river barges and many conform to the strict definition of the term, conventional usage does not refer to a narrowboat as a widebeam or as a barge, both of which are definable by their greater width. In the context of British inland waterways, a barge is usually a much wider, cargo-carrying boat or a modern boat modelled on one, certainly more than 7 feet (2.13 m) wide.

Another historic term for a narrow boat is long boat, which has been noted in the Midlands and especially on the River Severn and connecting waterways to Birmingham.

There is not a standard term for either boats based on narrowboat design, but too wide for narrow canals; or boats the same width as narrowboats but based on other types of boat.

Narrowboats may have ship prefix NB.

== Size ==
The key distinguishing feature of a narrowboat is its width, which must be less than 7 feet (2.13 m) to navigate British narrow canals. Some old boats are very close to this limit (often built 7 feet 1 1/2 inches or 2.17 metres or slightly wider), and can have trouble using certain narrow locks whose width has been reduced over time because of subsidence. Modern boats are usually produced to a maximum of 6 feet 10 inches (2.08 m) wide to guarantee easy passage throughout the complete system.

Because of their slenderness, some narrowboats seem very long. The maximum length is about 72 feet (21.95 m), which matches the length of the longest locks on the system. Modern narrowboats tend to be shorter, to permit cruising anywhere on the connected network of British canals – including on canals built for wider, but shorter, boats. The shortest lock on the main network is Salterhebble Middle Lock on the Calder and Hebble Navigation, at about 56 feet (17.07 m) long. However, the Calder and Hebble is a wide canal, so the lock is about 14 feet 2 inches (4.32 m) wide. This makes the largest narrowboat that can go anywhere on the network slightly longer (about 58 feet or 17.68 metres) than the straight length of the lock, because it can (with a certain amount of "shoehorning") lie diagonally. Some locks on isolated waterways are as short as 40 feet (12.19 m). Where it was possible to avoid going through locks, narrow boats were sometimes built a little larger. Wharf boats or more usually '"Amptons", operated on the Wolverhampton level of the Birmingham Canal Navigations and were up to 89 feet in length and 7 foot 10.5 inches wide.

Fleets for hire on British canals usually consist of narrow boats in varied lengths from 30 feet (9.14 m) upwards, to allow parties of different numbers or varying budgets to be able to hire a boat and get afloat.

== Development – Traditional Working Boats ==
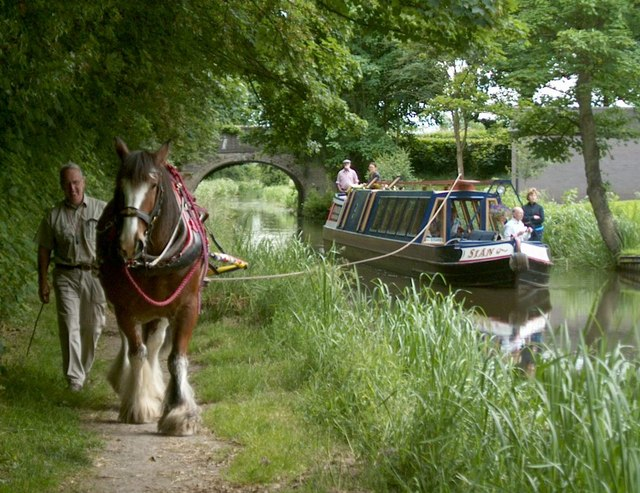
The horse-drawn narrowboat SIÂN on the Montgomery Canal

The first narrow boats played a key part in the economic changes of the British Industrial Revolution. They were wooden boats drawn by a horse walking on the canal towpath led by a crew member, often a child. Narrow boats were chiefly designed for carrying cargo, though some packet boats carried passengers, luggage, mail and parcels.

The first canals to feature locks in the now standard size were the canals designed by James Brindley and approved by Parliament in 1766, including the Staffordshire and Worcestershire Canal and Trent and Mersey Canal. Although construction took many years, the lock size became standard for many canal building projects.

Boatmen's families originally lived ashore, but in the 1830s as canals started to suffer competition from the burgeoning railway system, families (especially those of independent single boat owner/skippers) began to live on board, partly because they could no longer afford rents, partly to provide extra hands to work the boats harder, faster and further, partly to keep families together. As late as 1858, a Household Words article states that "the Grand Junction Canal company did not allow the boatmen's families on board." The crew of the non-stopping (fly) boat in the article (skipper, two crew and a "youth") is said to be typical.

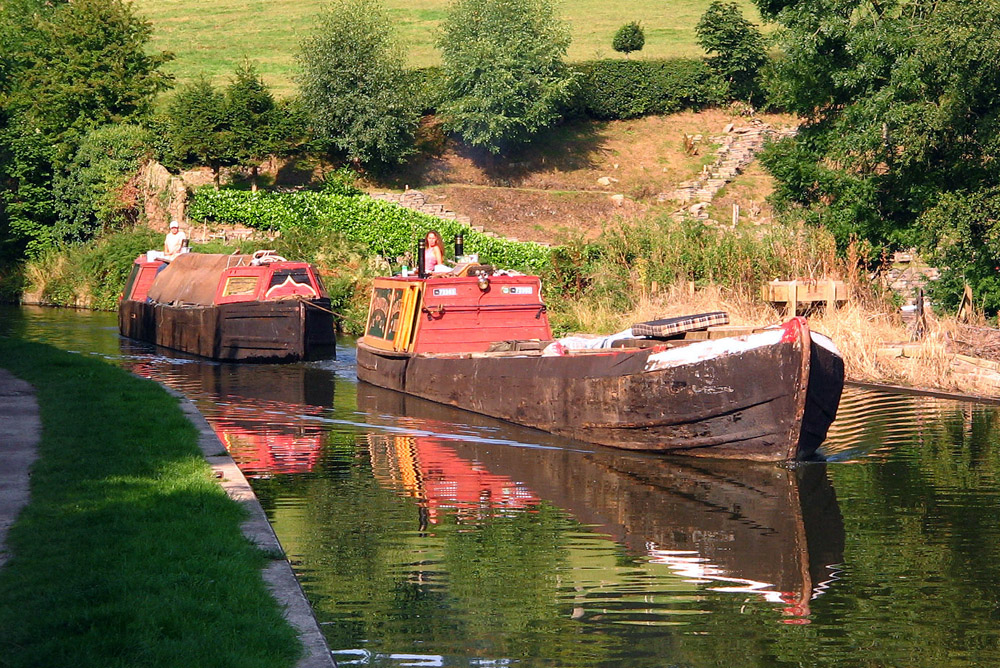
Historic working narrow boats on the Macclesfield Canal in Cheshire, England. The leading boat, Forget Me Not, is hauling the un-powered butty Lilith. This became a familiar operating pattern once motors began to replace horses.

The rear portion of the boat became the boatman's cabin, familiar from picture postcards and museums, famous for its space-saving ingenuity and interior made attractive by a warm stove, a steaming kettle, gleaming brass, fancy lace, painted housewares and decorated plates. Such descriptions rarely consider the actual comfort of a (sometimes large) family, working brutally hard and long days, sleeping in one tiny cabin. However many shore-bound workers endured harder indoor trades in less healthy conditions and in worse accommodation, where the family was separated for long hours rather than being together all day. The lifestyle afloat, by definition itinerant, made it impossible for children to attend school. Most boat people were effectively illiterate and ostracised by those living "on the bank", who considered themselves superior.

As steam and diesel progressively replaced the tow-horse in the early years of the 20th century, it became possible to move even more cargo with fewer hands by towing a second, un-powered boat, referred to as a butty, buttyboat or butty boat. Although there was no longer a horse to maintain, the butty had to be steered while being towed. So that the butty boatman could lengthen or shorten towline as needed, the towline wasn't tied-off on the bow, instead travelled over the buttyboat through permanent running blocks on stands or retractable middle masts and managed in the stern. On a wide canal, such as the Grand Union Canal, the pair could be roped side-to-side (breasted up) and handled as a unit through working locks.

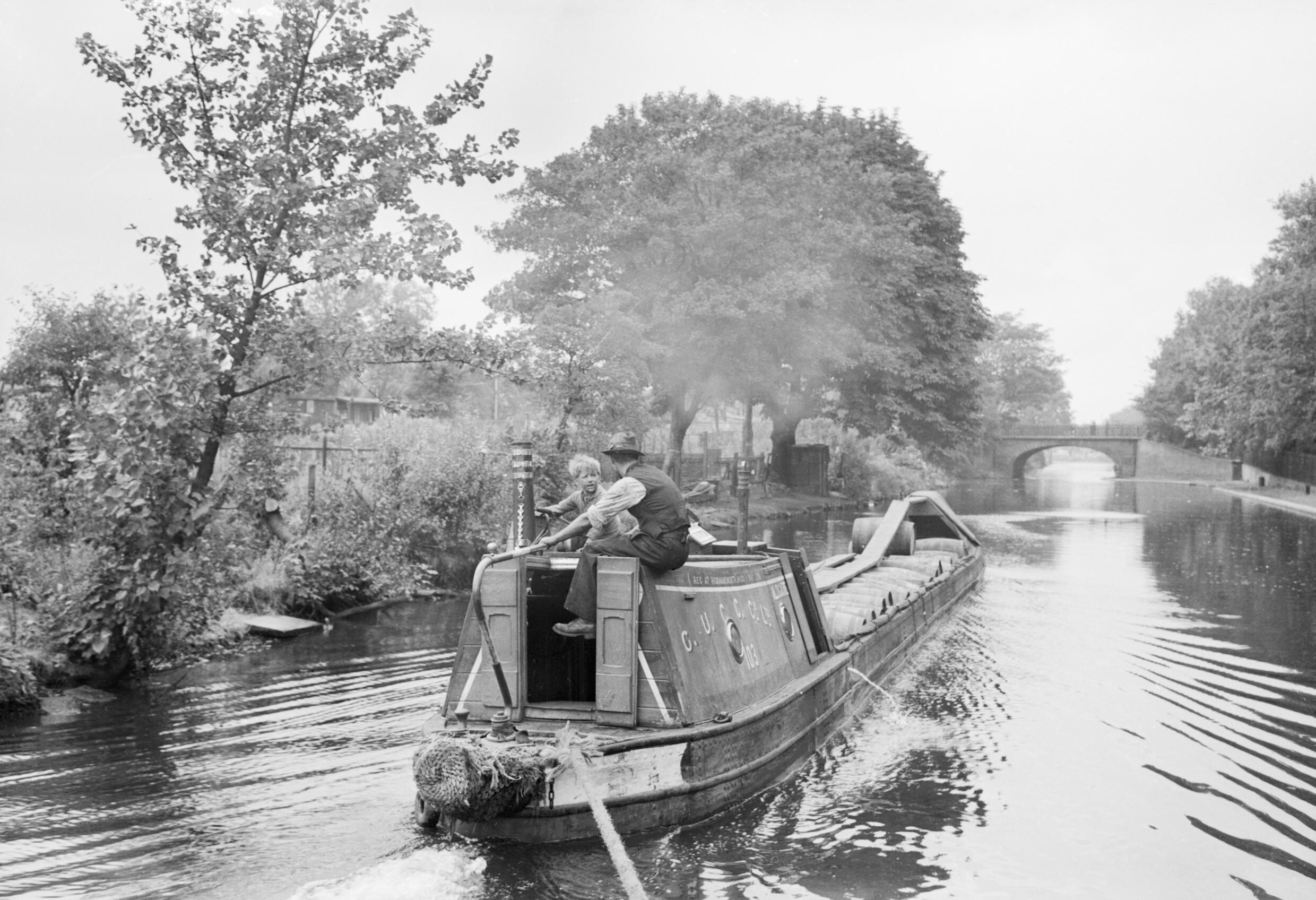
A narrowboat, crewed by a boatman and his son, carrying barrels of fruit pulp on the Regent's Canal, London, 1944

Cargo-carrying by narrow boat diminished from 1945 and the last regular long-distance traffic disappeared in 1970. However, some traffic continued into the 1980s and beyond. Two million tonnes of aggregate were carried on the Grand Union (River Soar) between 1976 and 1996, latterly using wide-beam barges. Aggregate continues to be carried between Denham and West Drayton on the (wide) Grand Union Canal and on the tidal estuary of Bow Creek (which is the eventual outflow of the Lee & Stort Navigation).

A few people are doing their best in the 21st century to keep the tradition of canal-borne cargo-carrying alive, mostly by one-off deliveries rather than regular runs, or by selling goods such as coal to other boaters. Enthusiasts remain dedicated to restoring the remaining old narrow boats, often as members of the Historic Narrow Boat Owners Club. There are many replicas, such as Hadar, ornately painted with traditional designs, usually of roses and castles. Boats not horse-drawn may have a refurbished, slow-revving, vintage semi-diesel engine. There are some steam-driven narrow boats such as the ex-Fellows Morton & Clayton steamer President.

=== Painted decoration ===
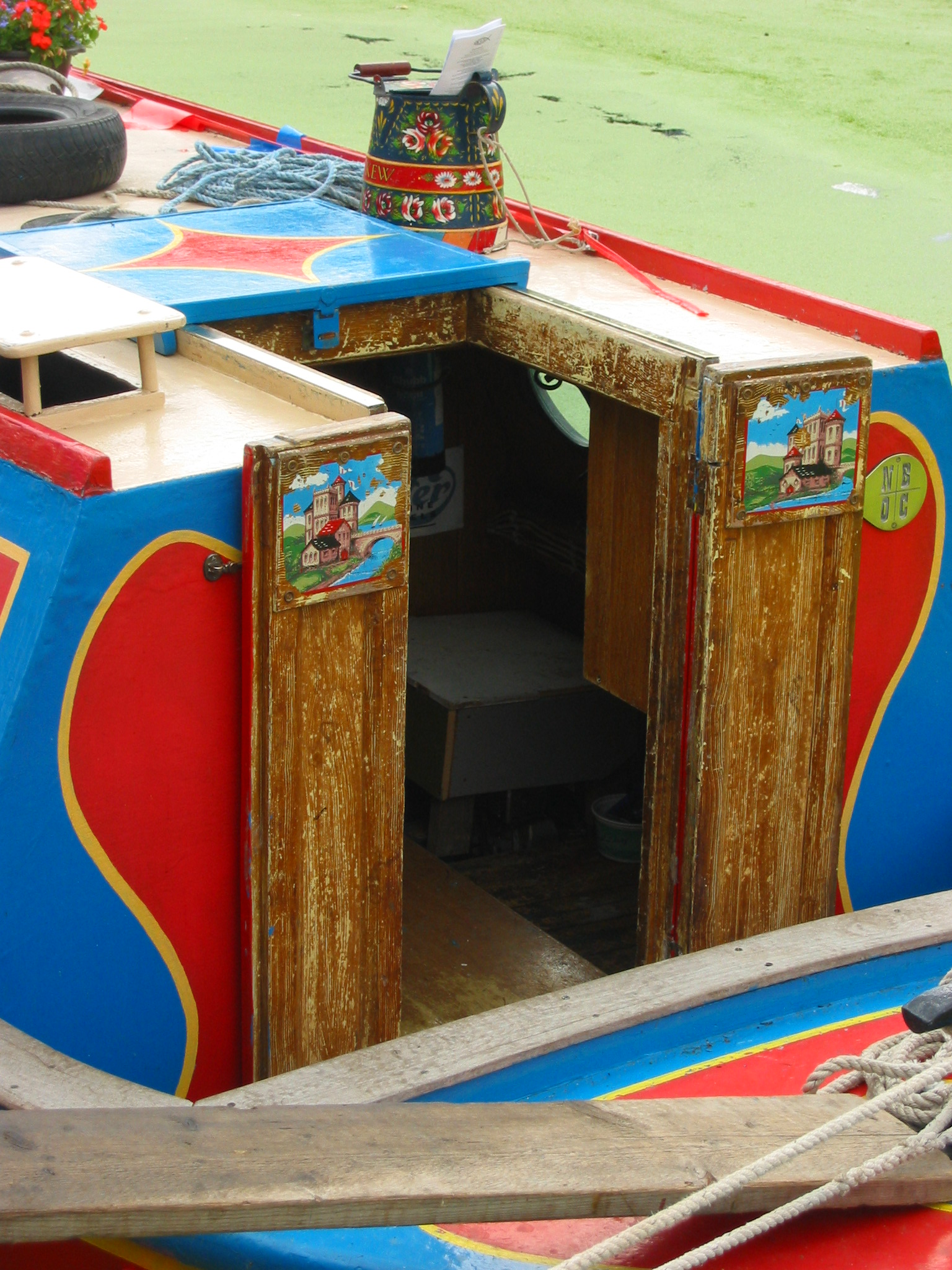
Decoration on a traditional English narrowboat: roses on the water can (top) and castles on the open doors to the cabin

By the end of the 19th century, it was common practice to paint roses and castles on narrow boats and their fixtures and fittings. Common sites include the doors to the cabin, the water can or barrel and the side of the boat along with ornate lettering giving the boat's name and owner. This tradition did not happen in all regions, the Chesterfield Canal being one waterway where narrow boats never bore such decorations.

The origin of the roses and castles found on canal boats is unclear. The first written reference to them appears to be in an 1858 edition of the magazine Household Words in one of a series of articles titled "On the Canal", showing that the art form must have existed by this date. For some time, a popular suggestion was that it had some form of Romani origin; however, there does not appear to be a significant link between the Romani and boating communities. Other suggestions include transfer of styles from the clock-making industry (in particular the decoration on the face), the japanning industry or the pottery industry. There is certainly a similarity in style and a geographical overlap, but no solid proof of a link. There are similar styles of folk art in Scandinavia, Germany, Turkey and Bangladesh.

In the 18th century, similar Dutch Hindeloopen paintwork would only have been a sailing barge journey away from the Thames. There is also an article in the Midland Daily Telegraph of 22 July 1914 that credits the practice of painting of water cans, at least, to a Mr Arthur Atkins.

While the practice declined as commercial use of the canals dwindled, it has seen something of a revival in recent times with the emergence of leisure boating. Narrowboat decoration with roses and castle themes is a common sight on today's canals, although these may utilise cheaper printed vinyl transfers in place of the traditional craft of hand-painted designs.

== Modern narrowboats ==
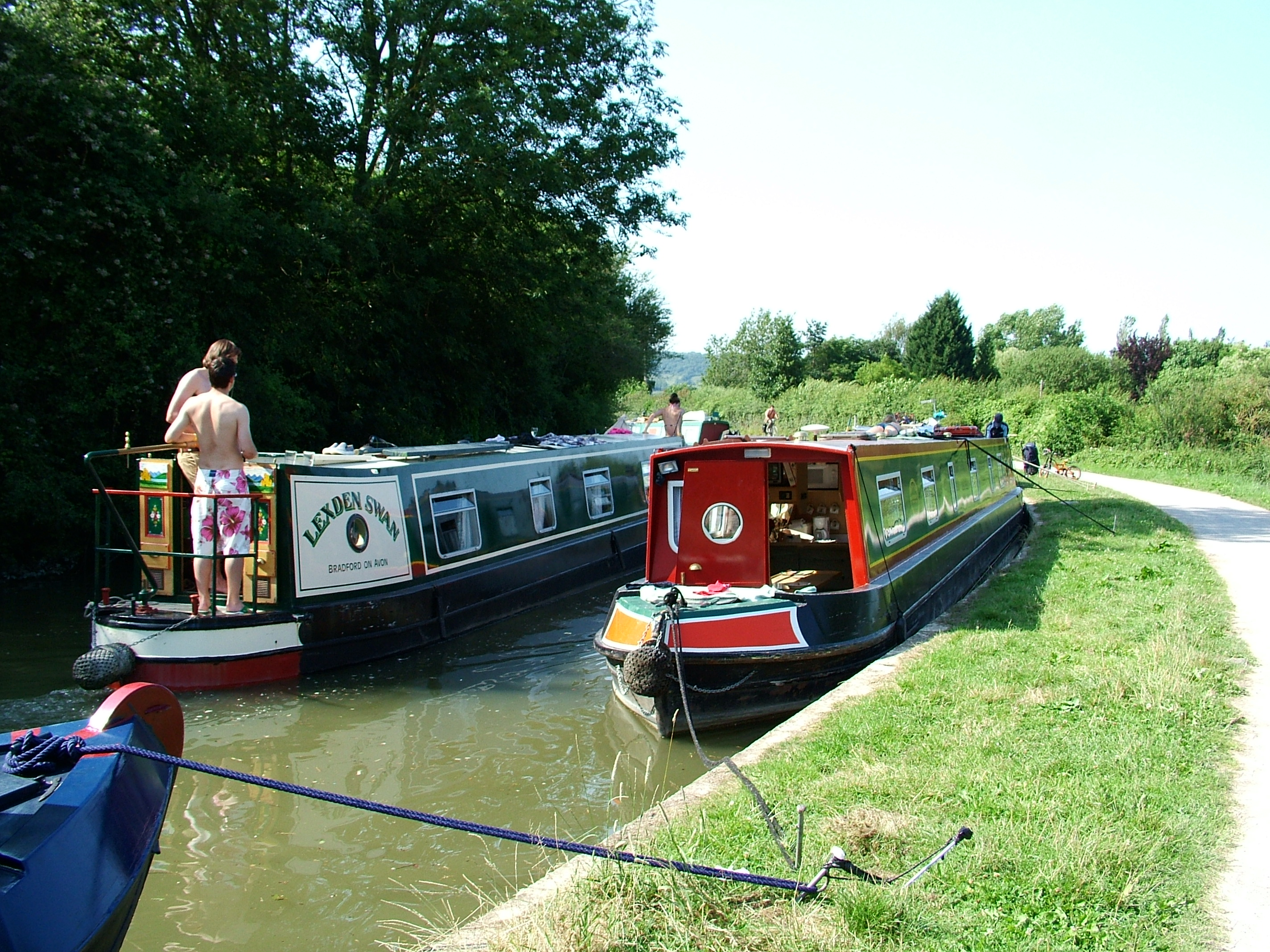
Modern narrowboats on the Kennet and Avon Canal

The number of licensed boats on canals and rivers managed by the Canal & River Trust (CRT), a charitable trust, formerly British Waterways, was estimated at 27,000 in 2006. By 2014 this number had risen to over 30,000. There were perhaps another 5,000 unlicensed boats kept in private moorings or on other waterways in 2006. Most boats on CRT waterways are steel (or occasionally, aluminium) cruisers popularly referred to as narrowboats.

Modern leisure narrowboats are used for holidays, weekend breaks, or touring, or as permanent or part-time residences. Usually, they have steel hulls and a steel superstructure, but when they were first being developed for leisure use in the 1970s glass reinforced plastic (fibre-glass) or timber was often used above gunwale height. Newer narrowboats, say post 1990, are usually powered by modern diesel engines and may be fitted inside to a high standard. There is typically at least 6 feet (1.8 m) internal headroom and often similar domestic facilities as land homes: central heating, flush toilet, shower or even bath, four-ring hob, oven, grill, microwave oven, and refrigerator. Some may have satellite television and mobile broadband, using 4G or LTE technology. Externally, their resemblance to traditional boats can vary from a faithful imitation (false "rivets", and copies of traditional paintwork) through interpretation (clean lines and simplified paintwork) through to a free-style approach which does not try to pretend in any way that this is a traditional boat.

Boats may be owned by individuals, shared by a group of friends (or by a more formally organised syndicate), rented out by holiday firms, or used as cruising hotels. A few boats are lived on permanently: either based in one place (though long-term moorings for residential narrowboats are frequently very difficult to find) or continuously moving around the network (perhaps with a fixed location for the coldest months, when many stretches of canal are closed by repair works, stoppages).

A support infrastructure has developed to provide services to the leisure boats, with some narrowboats being used as platforms to provide services such as engine maintenance and boat surveys; while some others are used as fuel tenders, that provide diesel, solid fuel (coal and wood) and Calor Gas.

=== Types ===
On almost all narrowboats steering is by tiller, as was the case on all working narrow boats. The steerer stands at the stern of the boat, aft of the hatchway and/or rear doors at the top of the steps up from the cabin. The steering area comes in three basic types, each meeting different needs of maximising internal space; having a more traditional appearance; having a big enough rear deck for everyone to enjoy summer weather or long evenings; or protection outside in bad weather. Each type has its advocates. However, the boundaries are not fixed, and some boats blur the categories as new designers try out different arrangements and combinations.

==== Traditional stern ====
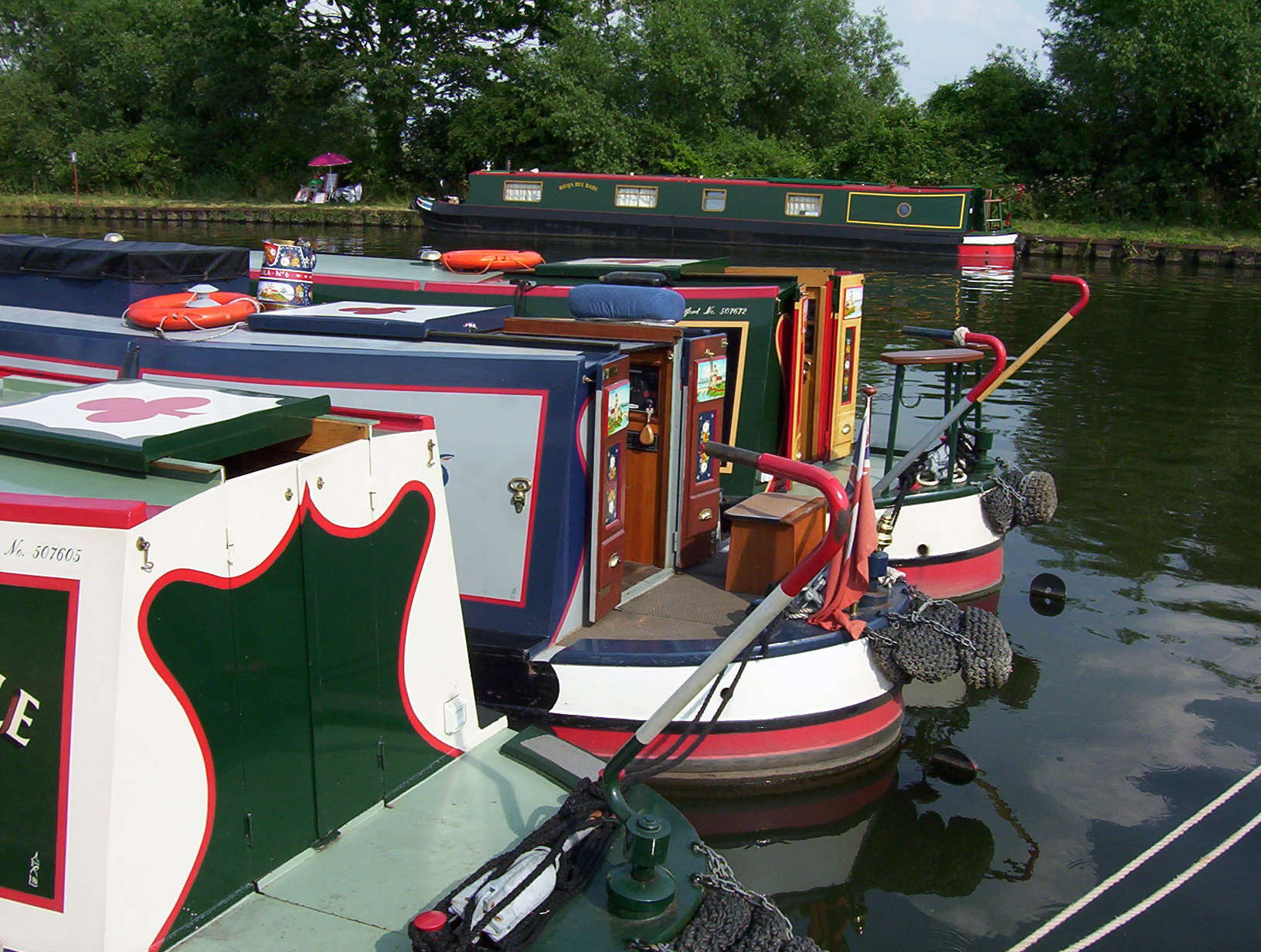
Traditional-stern narrowboats at Saul, Gloucestershire

Many modern canal boats retain the traditional layout of a small open, unguarded counter, or deck, behind the rear doors from which the crew can step onto land. It is possible to steer from the counter, but this is not very safe, with the propeller churning below only one missed step away. The tiller extension allows the steerer to stand in safety on the top step, forward of the rear doors. (On a working boat, this step would have been over the top of the coal box). On cold days, the steerer can even close the rear doors behind themselves and be in relative comfort, their lower body in the warmth of the cabin, and only their upper body emerging from the hatchway and exposed to the elements. In good weather, many trad-stern steerers sit up on the hatchway edge, a high vantage point giving good all-round visibility. On trad boats, the bow well-deck forms the main outside viewing area, because the traditional stern is not large enough for anyone other than the steerer to stand on safely. Internally, trads may have an engine room forward of a traditional boatman's cabin, or an enclosed engine tucked away out of sight and the increased living space this brings.

==== Cruiser stern ====
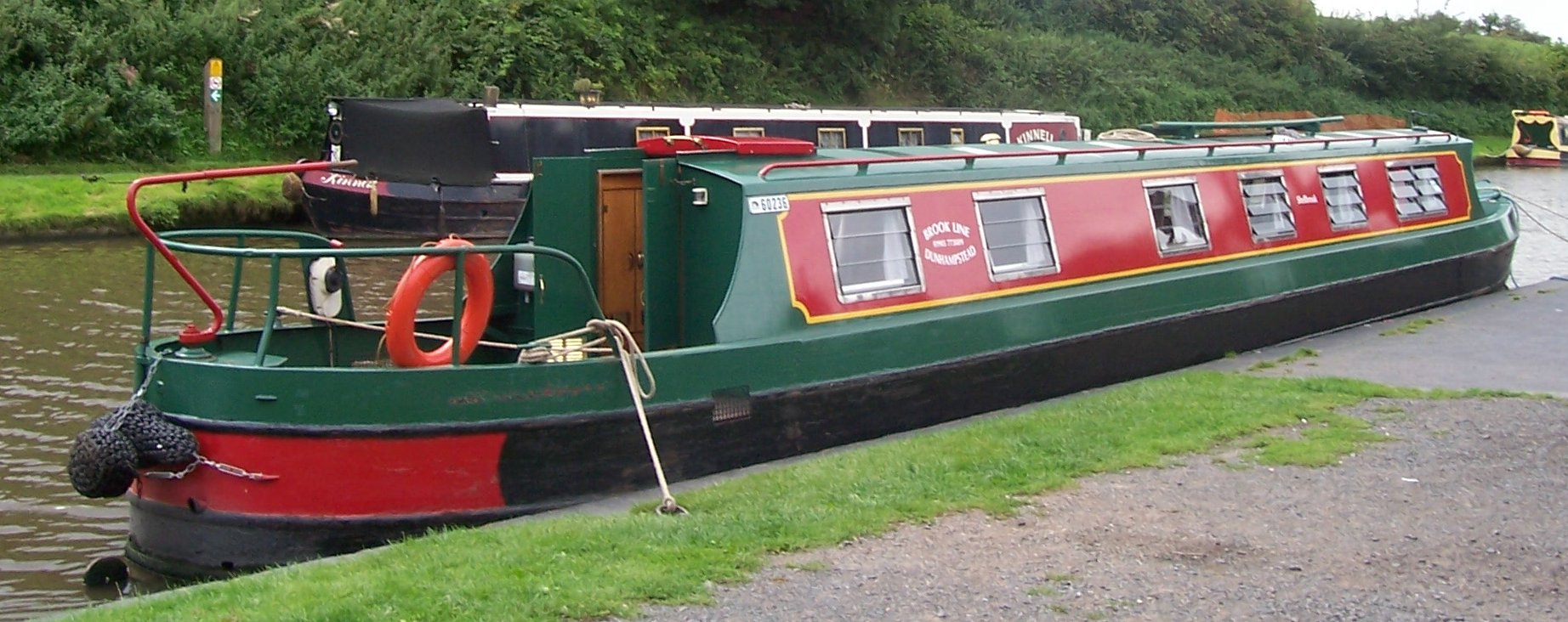
Cruiser-stern narrowboat at Tardebigge

The name for this style arises from the large open rear deck resembling that of the large rear cockpits common on glass-fibre (glass-reinforced plastic or GRP) river cruisers which in turn derives from elliptical sterns used on cruisers and larger warships in the 20th century. At the stern, a cruiser narrowboat looks very different from traditional boats: the hatch and rear doors are considerably further forward than on a trad, creating a large open deck between counter and rear doors, protected by a taffrail (railing), perhaps with built-in seating, around back and sides. The large rear deck provides a good al fresco dining area or social space, allowing people to congregate on deck in good weather and the summer holiday season.

In winter (or less than perfect weather of summer) the steerer may be unprotected from the elements. The lack of an enclosed engine room means that engine heat does not contribute to keeping the boat warm and there may be "wasted" space above the deck area. A cruiser stern allows the engine to be located under the deck, rather than in the body of the boat. Although this may make access to the engine more of a nuisance (due to weather considerations) the whole deck can usually be lifted off in whole or in sections, allowing the operative to stand inside the engine bay. The cruiser stern has a major advantage that the engine is located entirely outside the living space. In this configuration also, it is common to find that the engine bay contains batteries, isolator switching, fuel tanks and seldom-used kit, spares and equipment.

A pram cover can be fitted to a cruiser stern. Named after a baby's pram, this usually consists of a cloth cover on a folding metal frame. When erected, it encloses the cruiser stern, allowing more comfortable operation of the boat in cold or inclement weather.

==== Semi-traditional stern ====
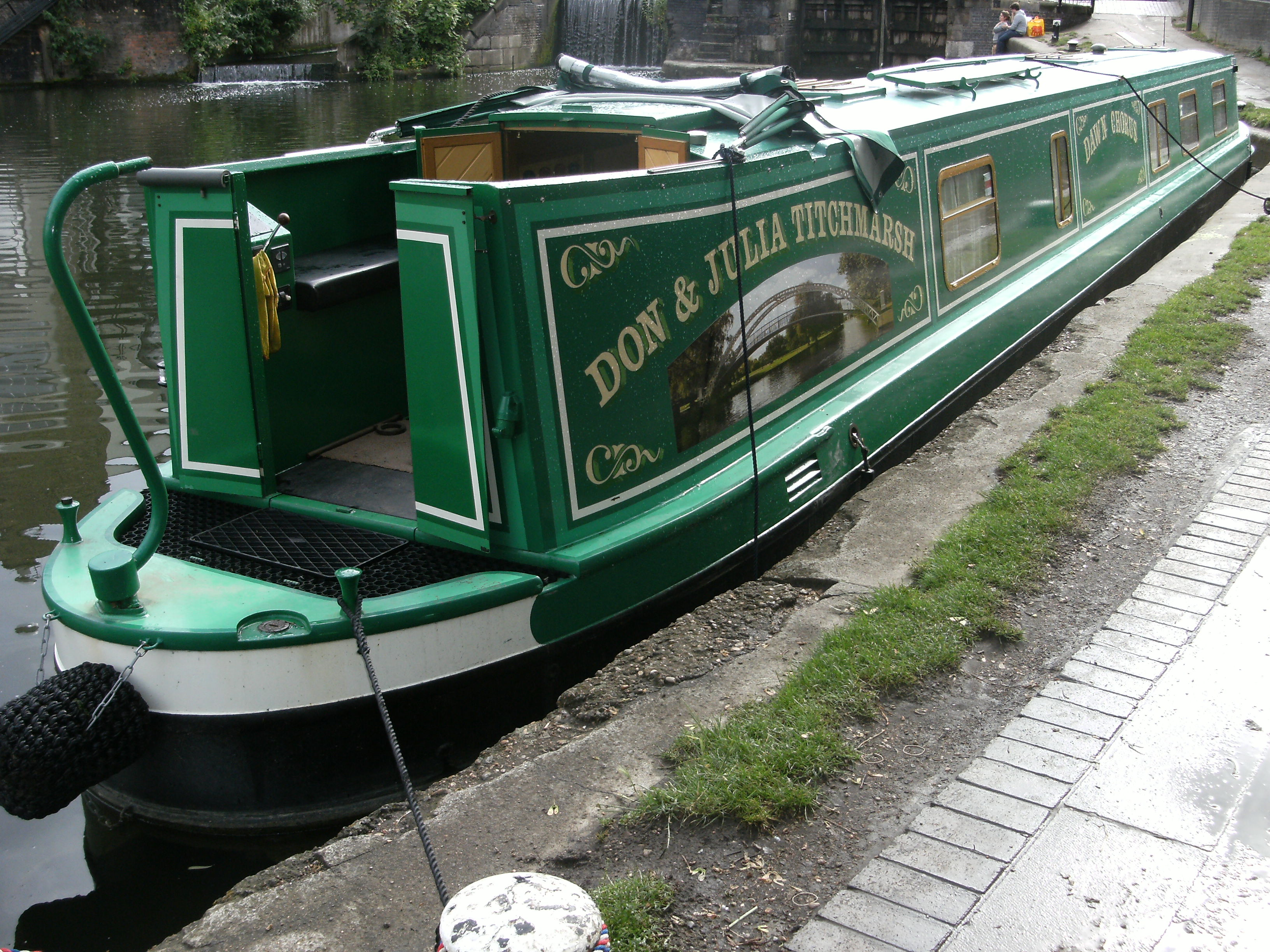
The Narrowboat Dawn Chorus with a semi-traditional stern on Regents Canal in London in 2011

A semi-traditional stern (or semi-trad) is a compromise to gain some of the social benefits of a cruiser stern, while retaining a more traditional design and providing some protection for the steerer in bad weather or in cooler seasons. As with the cruiser stern, the deck is extended back from the hatch and rear doors, but in this case most of the deck is protected at the sides by walls which extend back from the cabin sides – giving a more sheltered area for the steerer and companions, usually with lockers to sit on. The engine is located under the deck, much like a cruiser, again allowing a separation between the cabin and the engine bay, with the steps down to the cabin being located past the false sides of the semi-trad social area.

Semi-trad sterns can also be fitted with pram covers.

==== With a butty stern ====
A butty boat is an unpowered boat traditionally with a larger rudder with (usually) a wooden tiller (known as an elum, a corruption of helm) as the steering does not benefit from the force of water generated by the propeller so the rudder must be of a larger area. The tiller is usually removed and reversed in the rudder-post socket to get it out of the way when moored. A few butty boats have been converted into powered narrowboats like NB Sirius. The term butty is derived from the dialect word buddy, meaning companion.

==== Centre cockpit ====
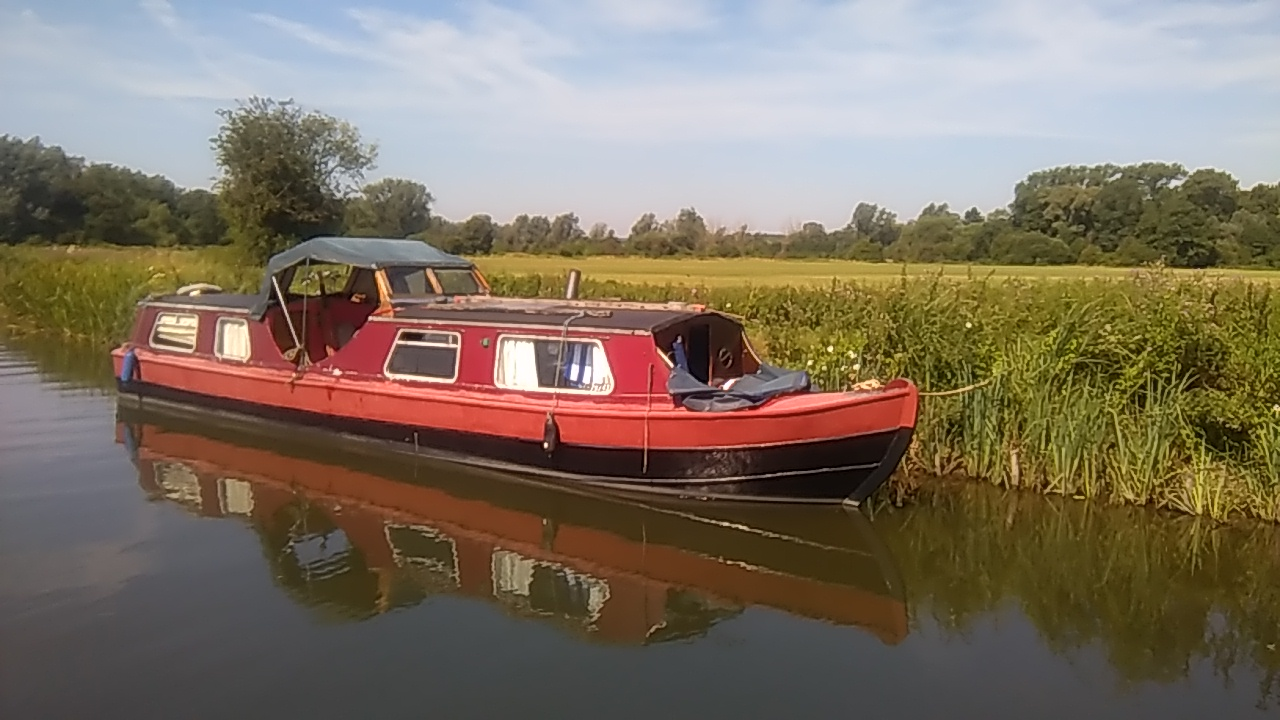
A narrowboat with a centre cockpit moored on the river Stort between Roydon and Harlow

While the vast majority of narrowboats have tiller steering at the stern, a small number of steel narrowboats dispense with the need for a rear steering deck entirely, by imitating some river cruisers in providing wheel steering from a central cockpit. This layout has the advantage (as have many Dutch barges) of enabling an aft cabin to be separate from the forward accommodation.

=== Capabilities and limitations ===
Narrowboats are Category D boats under the Recreational Craft Directive, intended only for navigating inland – rivers, canals and small lakes – but under the professional supervision of a suitable local pilot, limited coastal passages linking inland waterways, such as along the tidal Severn Estuary between Bristol and Sharpness, can also be safely made in calm weather. Insurers will often require a pilot for these hazardous areas, and temporary modifications to improve seaworthiness such as waterproof coverings for bow doors and air vents close to the waterline. Some intrepid boaters have crossed the English Channel in a narrowboat.

In all cases beyond inland use, familiarity with coastal safety such as:

- the expected weather, tidal streams, and navigation charts
- COLREGS, radar reflectors, and navigation lights,
- VHF communications, distress signals, and lifejackets

is strongly recommended.

== National organisations ==
- Canal & River Trust
- Inland Waterways Association – campaigns for the use, maintenance, and restoration of Britain's inland waterways
- National Association of Boat Owners (NABO) – 3,000 members in 2004. They publish one of the few in-print books about living aboard a narrowboat, Living Afloat (2005). See also 'Living Aboard', The History Press (2008).
- National Community Boats Association – a federation of organisations running narrow and other boats on navigable waterways for the benefit of the community.
- Scottish Canals

== See also ==
- Cabin cruiser
- Canal mooring
- Canals of Great Britain
- Canal elevator
- Continuous cruiser
- Dutch barge
- History of the British canal system
- Houseboat
- Lighter (barge)
- L. T. C. Rolt
- Pleasure craft
- Widebeam
