= IWA National Festival =

The IWA National Festival & Boat Show run by the Inland Waterways Association is one of the key annual events on the United Kingdom's inland waterways. Generally referred to as the "National" it serves several functions:

- As a publicity vehicle for the IWA and inland waterways in general
- To raise funds for the IWA
- As a social gathering for boaters from around the country
- As a campaigning event

The four functions of the event are to some extent conflicting and in recent years the campaigning aspect has been somewhat separated by the creation of an annual "Campaign Cruise".

Arguably it is as a gathering of like minded people that the National has been most influential. The festival brings together people from all over the country who do not meet in numbers except on the festival site. The original decisions to form both the Waterway Recovery Group and the National Association of Boat Owners both arose out of informal discussions held at the National.

== Development ==
The first festival was held in 1950, inspired by car rallies which Tom Rolt, one of the founders of the Inland Waterways Association, had attended prior to the Second World War. It was held at Market Harborough, as the location was not restricted to narrowboats. The rally was called the Market Harborough Festival of Boats and Arts. The arts element of the festival was an addition made by Robert Aickman and was one of the elements that led to the eventual split between Rolt and Aickman. However, the festival was a success, and one of Rolt's innovations was the awarding of trophies for impressive service or performance, a practice that continued. The A. P. Herbert Trophy was awarded to the person who had traveled the furthest to get to the rally, and was won by Stan Offley, who had covered 220 miles (350 km) and had passed through 156 locks. His route from Ellesmere Port had used the Manchester Ship Canal, the Bridgewater Canal, the Leeds and Liverpool Canal, the Aire and Calder Navigation, the River Trent and the Grand Union Canal. The much shorter route using the Trent and Mersey Canal was unavailable to him, as his boat was 7.5 feet (2.3 m) wide, and the Trent and Mersey locks were only 7 feet (2.1 m) wide.

Like many of the early rallies, that of 1962 was essentially a campaign to highlight the poor state of a particular waterway, in this case, the Stourbridge Canal and its connecting waterways. The decision to hold it at Stourbridge Basin was taken in late 1961, and David Hutchings, by then chairman of the rally committee, approached British Transport Waterways, the operating arm of the British Transport Commission (BTC) to ensure that the Stourbridge Branch would be dredged, to allow the boats to reach the festival site. Faced with a refusal, Hutchings hired a dragline excavator to carry out the work himself. The British Transport Commission threatened legal action against Hutchings, the Inland Waterways Association and the Staffordshire and Worcestershire Canal Society if he proceeded, but that did not stop him. His actions gained widespread media coverage, which was extremely critical of the BTC. The BTC was abolished later that year, and the rally went ahead, with British Waterways staff assisting boats through the decrepit locks. Just two years later, British Waterways and the Staffordshire and Worcestershire Canal Society agreed to work on restoring the Stourbridge Canal and the Dudley Canal, and this early example of co-operation resulted in the canals and locks reopening in 1967.

Marple Locks on the Peak Forest Canal was chosen as the site for the 1966 rally, again to highlight their condition. Access had to be along the Macclesfield Canal, as the locks themselves were derelict and could not be used. Cosmetic restoration began the following year, and the canal was reopened in 1974.

1970 was the first occasion on which the national festival was not also a campaign to save a threatened part of the waterways network. It was held at Guildford on the River Wey. Part of the reasoning for this was that the festival was proving to be very popular, and there were a limited number of places that had sufficient display space and water supply for the number of boats wanting to attend. The choice of site was not universally popular, but the rally saw the formal launching of the Waterway Recovery Group, a group of volunteers who traveled the country to carry out restoration tasks on derelict waterways.

Management of the festivals is now handled by a division of Inland Waterways Enterprises Ltd called IWA Festivals. The limited company was set up in 2001 to manage the various trading activities of the Inland Waterways Association.

=== Festival of Water ===
In 2014 IWA launched a new event, called IWA Festival of Water. The Festival takes places usually over the August bank holiday weekend and is held at a new location each year.

== Sites ==
The statistics below are mainly taken from the IWA website but are incomplete. Some of these were called rallies rather than festivals and not all were national events.

The final column shows the overall membership of the IWA in the year in question.

Year	Rally Location	Waterway	# Boats	# Visitors	Membership
1950	Market Harborough	Grand Union Canal, Leicester Branch)	120	50,000+	800
1951	(No festival)				1,300+
1952	Brecon	Monmouthshire and Brecon Canal			
1953	Macclesfield	Macclesfield Canal			
1954	(None)				
1955	Skipton	Leeds and Liverpool Canal			
1956	Lincoln	Fossdyke Navigation	100+		2,000
1957	Coventry	Coventry Canal			
1958	(None)				
1959	Chester	Shropshire Union Canal			
1960	Stoke on Trent	Trent and Mersey Canal			
1961	Aylesbury	Grand Union Canal			
1962	Stourbridge	Stourbridge Canal			
1963	Little Venice	Grand Union Canal, Paddington Branch			
1964	Stratford-upon-Avon	Upper Avon			
1965	Blackburn	Leeds and Liverpool Canal			
1966	Marple	Peak Forest Canal	250		
1967	Leicester	Grand Union Canal, Leicester Section	350		5,000
1968	Liverpool	Leeds and Liverpool Canal	170		
1969	Birmingham	Birmingham Canal Navigations			
1970	Guildford	River Wey	380	50,000	
1971	Northampton	River Nene			7,000
1972	Lymm	Bridgewater Canal	500		9,500
1973	Ely	Great Ouse, Old West River	255	30,000	
1974	Nottingham	River Trent	600		12,000
1975	York	River Ouse			
1976	Peterborough	River Nene	142	33,000	
1977	Reading	River Thames	370		
1978	Titford Pools	Titford Canal			15,000
1979	Northwich	River Weaver	622	30,000	17,728
1980	Lea Valley	River Lee	500	25,000	19,274
1981	Leeds	Aire and Calder Navigation	410		18,838
1982	Titford Pools	Titford Canal	500	40,000	
1983	Wigan	Leeds and Liverpool Canal	428	50,000	
1984	Hawkesbury	Coventry Canal	661		
1985	Milton Keynes	Grand Union Canal	514	30,000	
1986	Brentford	Grand Union Canal, Main Line	450		
1987	Hawkesbury	Coventry Canal	530	50,000	
1988	Castlefield	Bridgewater Canal			
1989	Waltham Abbey	River Lee	525	50,000	22,000
1990	Gloucester	Gloucester and Sharpness Canal			22,268
1991	Windmill End	Dudley Canal Line No. 2	768	385,000	
1992	Wakefield	Aire and Calder Navigation, Wakefield section			
1993	Peterborough	River Nene	487	78,000	19,167
1994	Waltham Abbey	River Lee			17,730
1995	Chester	Shropshire Union Canal Main Line			
1996	Windmill End	Dudley Canal Line No. 2			17,501
1997	Henley	River Thames	558	27,500	
1998	Salford Quays	Manchester Ship Canal			
1999	Worcester	River Severn			16,869
2000	Waltham Abbey	River Lee			16,739
2001	Milton Keynes	Grand Union Canal	347	25,000	
2002	Huddersfield	Huddersfield Broad Canal	191		17,544
2003	Beale Park	River Thames	567	32,000	
2004	Burton on Trent	Trent and Mersey Canal		24,000	
2005	Preston Brook	Bridgewater Canal			17,242
2006	Beale Park	River Thames	600	28,000	
2007	St Ives	Great Ouse			
2008	Autherley Junction	Shropshire Union Canal	300		
2009	Red Hill	River Soar			
2010	Beale Park	River Thames			
2011	Burton on Trent	Trent and Mersey Canal	360	25,000	
2013	Cassiobury Park Watford	Grand Union Canal			
2014	Saul Junction	Stroudwater Canal			
2015	Northampton	River Nene			
2016	Pelsall	Wyrley and Essington Canal			
2017	Ilkeston	Erewash Canal			
2018	St Neots	Great Ouse			
2019	Waltham Abbey	Lee Navigation	100+		
2020	(None)				
2021	Worcester	Worcester and Birmingham Canal			
2022	Burton-on-Trent	Trent & Mersey Canal			
2023	Pelsall	Wyrley and Essington Canal	70-80		

== Bibliography ==
- Blagrove, David (2006). The Inland Waterways Association. Tempus Publishing. ISBN 0-7524-3158-7.
- Bolton, David (1990). Race against Time. Methuen. ISBN 0-413-63470-1.
- Cumberlidge, Jane (2009). Inland Waterways of Great Britain (8th Ed). Imray Laurie Norie and Wilson. ISBN 978-1-84623-010-3.
- Nicholson (2006). Nicholson Waterways Guide (Vol 5): North West and the Pennines. Harper Collins. ISBN 978-0-00-721113-5.
- Squires, Roger (2008). Britain's restored canals. Landmark Publishing. ISBN 978-1-84306-331-5.

== See also ==
- List of waterway societies in the United Kingdom
