= Continuous cruiser =

UK boat licence class

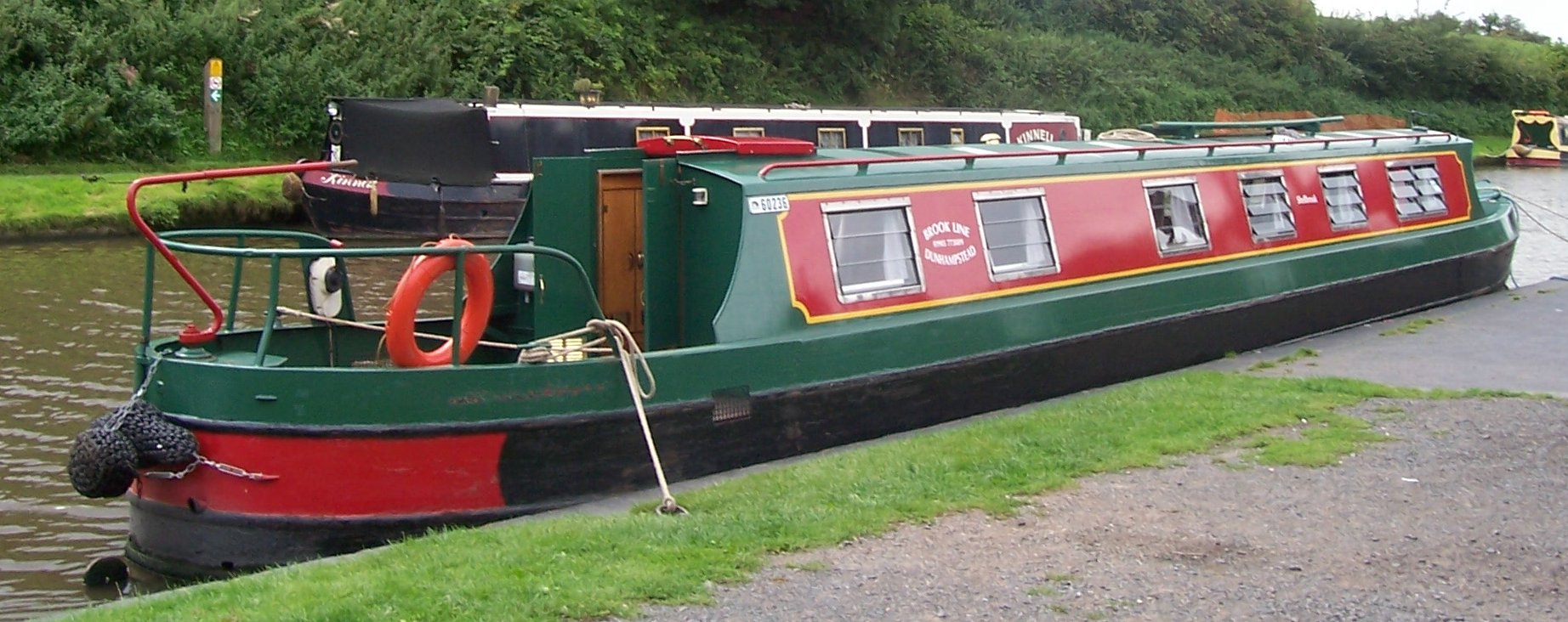
An example of what a boat used as a CCer may look like when moored. Mooring a CCer is the act of securing a mooring line (rope) between the boat and the bank, so the boat does not move away.

A continuous cruiser licence is a class of boat licence issued on United Kingdom inland waterways under the control of the Canal and River Trust (a charity which replaced British Waterways in July 2012). The term "continuous cruiser" refers specifically to boats and/or owners operating under such licence.

== A definition of continuous cruising ==
The continuous cruiser licence is so called as it applies to boats continuously cruising the waterway network as defined in the preamble. The reason such a classification is important (and contested) is that a boat claiming "continuous cruiser" status need not obtain a (paid-for) home mooring. Officially recognised moorings usually attract substantial mooring fees, so a boater, exploring the network full-time and having no need of a permanent base, is not required by law to have a permanent mooring or "home port". Applicants for a continuous cruiser licence make a binding declaration to abide by rules for continuous cruising.

== "Real" and "other" continuous cruisers ==
The Canal and River Trust (C&RT) defines as a "continuous cruiser" any boat which is always on the move and making "reasonable progress" between successive moorings. The C&RT recommends that a boater who keeps a log of their trip is less likely to have problems justifying their credentials.

Some boaters do not wish to move their boat very far – or not at all – if possible, (either to avoid expense, or to stay within an area e.g. from which they can travel to work) and cannot acquire (or, alternatively, do not wish to pay for) an "official mooring" in that place. Such boaters risk not being re-licensed (and hence they also risk having their boat removed from the Canal and River Trust's canals) by being repeatedly "logged" by C&RT spotters in or near one location. (Note: Use of the word "place" is intentionally avoided for purposes of this article as the word is undefinable under law.)

Because of the need to make journeys long enough to justify the terms of their licence as defined by the licensing authority (or at least to avoid coming to the attention of local officials), but short enough to keep them near their desired location, boaters based in one area but with a "continuous cruising" licence are sometimes disparagingly termed "bridge-hoppers" or "continuous moorers".

== History ==
Prior to 1995, all boats on the canal system controlled by [the then authority] British Waterways were required to have a permanent base for their boat known as a "home mooring". This was similar in concept to registration of marine craft in a "home port". Many boaters moved 'continuously', living on board as they travelled around, stopping in one place for a limited time. They neither wanted nor needed permanent moorings. Such boaters resented having to declare a home mooring, because they would have to pay a marina owner for services they had no intention of using, subsidising boaters who actually moored up either permanently, frequently or seasonally. This anomaly was recognised in the enactment of the British Waterways Act 1995 where Parliament accepted the boat owners' argument for fairness and built proviso into the 1995 act for boats not to have a home mooring.

== Current position ==
The amount of licence fee paid under the jurisdiction of the Canal & River Trust depends on a boat's length and breadth, whether or not a "home mooring" is declared. However, boaters without a home mooring must agree to abide by guidelines for continuous cruising written by the authority under their interpretation of the Act and without consultation or agreement with the users.

All boats on the system, whether having a home mooring or not, must proceed under British Waterways Act 1995 section 17(3)(c)(ii) states "without remaining continuously in any one place for more than 14 days or such longer period as is reasonable in the circumstances". However, many boaters without a home mooring feel they are discriminated against by 'heavy handed' action of C&RT enforcers and obliged to adhere to "guidelines" not conforming with the spirit or the wording of the 1995 act.

== Judicial review ==
On 23 July 2013 the Court of Appeal granted permission to Nick Brown for a judicial review of the authority's "Guidance for Boaters Without a Home Mooring". Lord Justice Jackson said in his judgement that the issue of whether the 2011 guidance accurately sets out the powers of CRT and the restrictions on licence holders arising from section 17 of the British Waterways Act 1995 merited pursuit in judicial review. In February 2014, two days after the judicial review started, Nick Brown, the legal officer of the National Bargee Travellers Association, applied to abandon his claim for a review. The judge, Mr Justice Lewis, accepted the application and awarded substantial costs to be paid by Mr Brown to the CRT.

== See also ==
- History of the British canal system
- Inland Waterways Association
- National Association of Boat Owners (NABO)
- Fulltiming
