= Beale Wildlife Park =

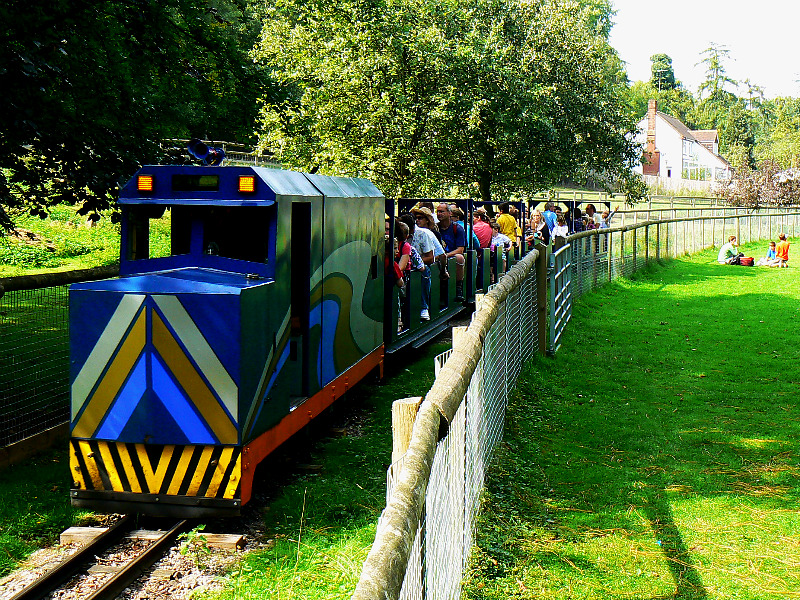
- Miniature train
- Interactive map of Beale Wildlife Park
- 51°30′N 1°6.5′W
- Date opened: 1956
- Location: Lower Basildon; Reading; Berkshire; RG8 9NH
- Website: bealepark.co.uk

Beale Wildlife Park is situated by the River Thames, between the villages of Pangbourne and Lower Basildon in Berkshire, England. It has three main areas of attraction: collections of small exotic animals, farm animals and birds; landscaped gardens and woodlands; and children's play areas.

In 1956, Beale Park was formed by Gilbert Beale who decided to give the 350-acre (140 ha) Thames-side park land to ‘the people’ by converting it from private farmland into a non-profit making, charitable trust. In those days it was little more than a track and a couple of ponds.

== Attractions ==
Over recent years, the park has expanded to accommodate a wide variety of visitors, especially the youngest ones. The park has recently built a Roplay area, a pets area, sand pits, paddling pools, Little Tikes Play Area, and the Beale Railway, a 1-mile (1.6 km) section of 10 1/2 in (267 mm) narrow gauge railway on which is run a diesel locomotive, "Sir Humphrey Davy"; and previously a steam locomotive, "John Remmy", each capable of pulling 5 carriages and 50 people. Thirteen people were injured when a steam train crashed on the Beale Railway on Saturday, 27 June 2009.

For older visitors, there are the gardens, lakes, and the model boat exhibition.

There is also a gift shop, education centre, and restaurant on site.

== Birds ==
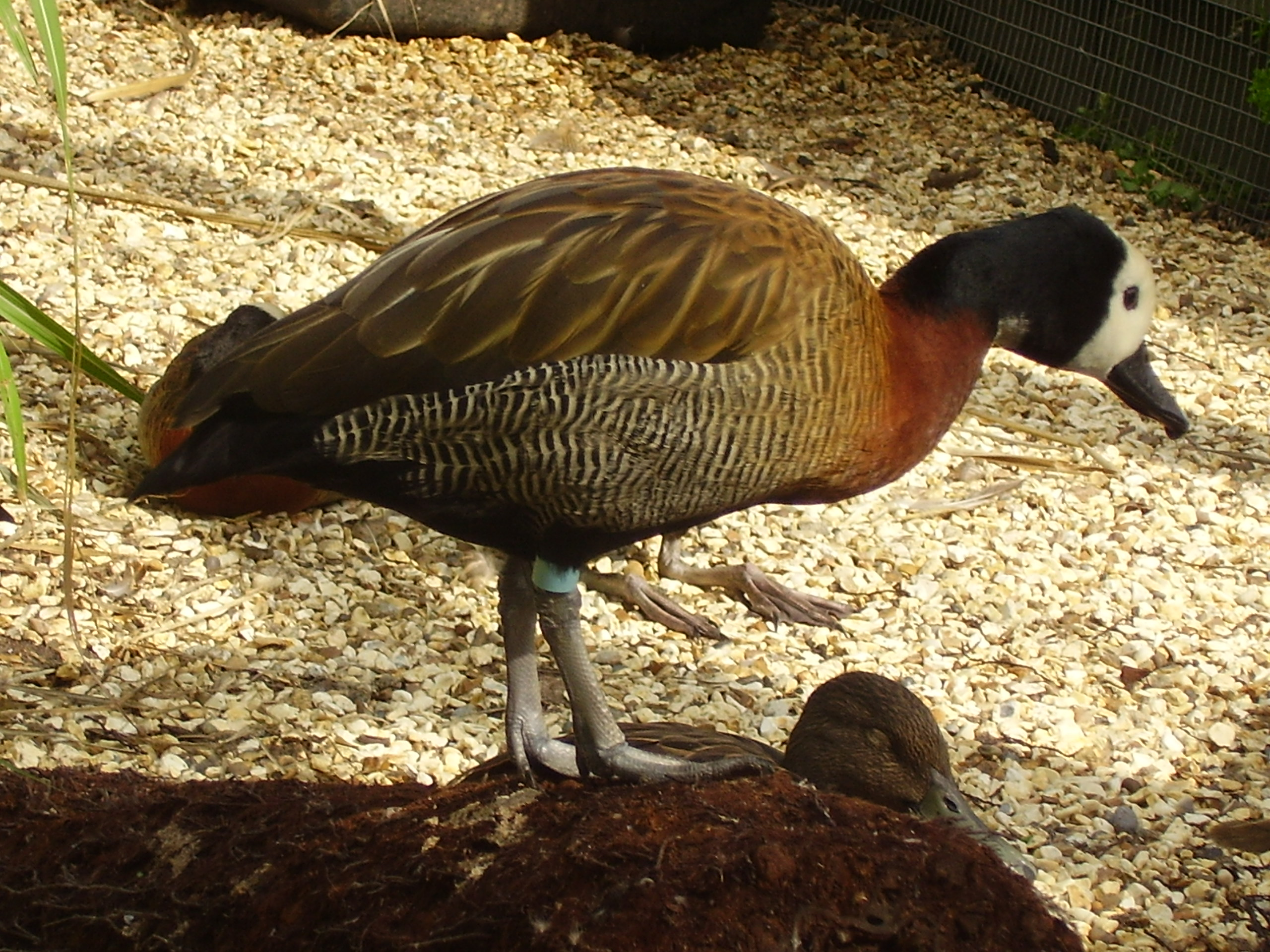
One of the White-faced whistling ducks the lemurs live with

Beale Park's aviaries are home to a wide variety of bird species that are threatened with extinction. Most notable are the green peafowl, the mountain peacock pheasant, and the Bali starling. There is also successful breeding programme and several birds have been released back to the wild.

There are many themed aviaries around the park including: Regional aviaries (home to African, Asian and Australian birds), the walkthrough aviary, the owlery, Madagascan aviary, and the flamingos.

== Changes ==
Over recent years, the park has expanded greatly to a more zoological collection, the park now houses lemurs, owls, and in 2007, meerkats, prairie dogs, and tamarins arrived.

2008 saw the arrival of various new exhibits and attractions including a New Zealand exhibit with wallabies and Arapawa goats.
