= National Association of Boat Owners =

The National Association of Boat Owners (NABO) is a UK inland boating organisation, of which its primary dedication according to their website is:

"Promoting the interests of private boaters on Britain's canals, rivers and lakes, so that their voice can be heard when decisions are being made which might affect their boating"

== Overview ==
NABO was formed in 1991, to represent the owners of boats using the inland waterway system of the UK by a group of boat owners who believed that the existing organisations did not adequately put forward their views to the waterway authorities at the time. The organisation is managed by a Council group elected at an Annual General Meeting in November each year, which consists of up to 12 volunteers, who meet in Birmingham every six weeks. There are no specific regional meetings or sub-committees, but each county has a Regional Representative on the council, a River Users Coordinator to look after the special interests of boat owners on rivers and a Continuous Cruising Representative.

== Achievements ==
NABO, by promoting the interests of private boaters on Britain's canals, rivers and lakes has achieved the following:

- They were successful in taking British Waterways to the Waterway Ombudsman over the lack of consultation concerning boat licence fee increases. By doing so they also brought to British Waterways attention the inadequacies in its Licence and Mooring Permit Conditions.
- They have been a leading influence in securing a commitment to minimise the mandatory requirements of the Boat Safety Scheme, and also in securing changes to the appeals procedure.
- NABO secured 28 amendments to the British Waterways Act 1995 and concessions on the way it would be applied before it was passed which brought in valuable safeguards for boaters.
- They took British Waterways to the Waterways Ombudsman over the BW's Waterways Standards document (standards for depth, facilities, etc. on waterways controlled by British Waterways) because BW had refused to make copies available to the public, and made it available to all boaters at a nominal charge.
- NABO continues to promote more dredging, and pressure from NABO and others secured a 50% increase in British Waterways Southern Region dredging budget over a five-year period.
- Their campaign for an Independent Waterways Regulator for all waterways, added significantly to British Waterways resolve to restructure their complaints and consultation procedures and produce a statement of intent document titled 'Openness and Accountability'.

== Membership ==
Members are informed of NABO's current progress and status through the organisations magazine NABO News which is published six/seven times a year, and the 'members pages' on their website. To voice their opinions they are encouraged to Attend Council meetings, or phone, write to, or email Council members with their views or concerns.

== See also ==
- Inland Waterways Association
- British Waterways
