= Inland Waterways Association =

Charity campaigning to preserve British canals

The Inland Waterways Association
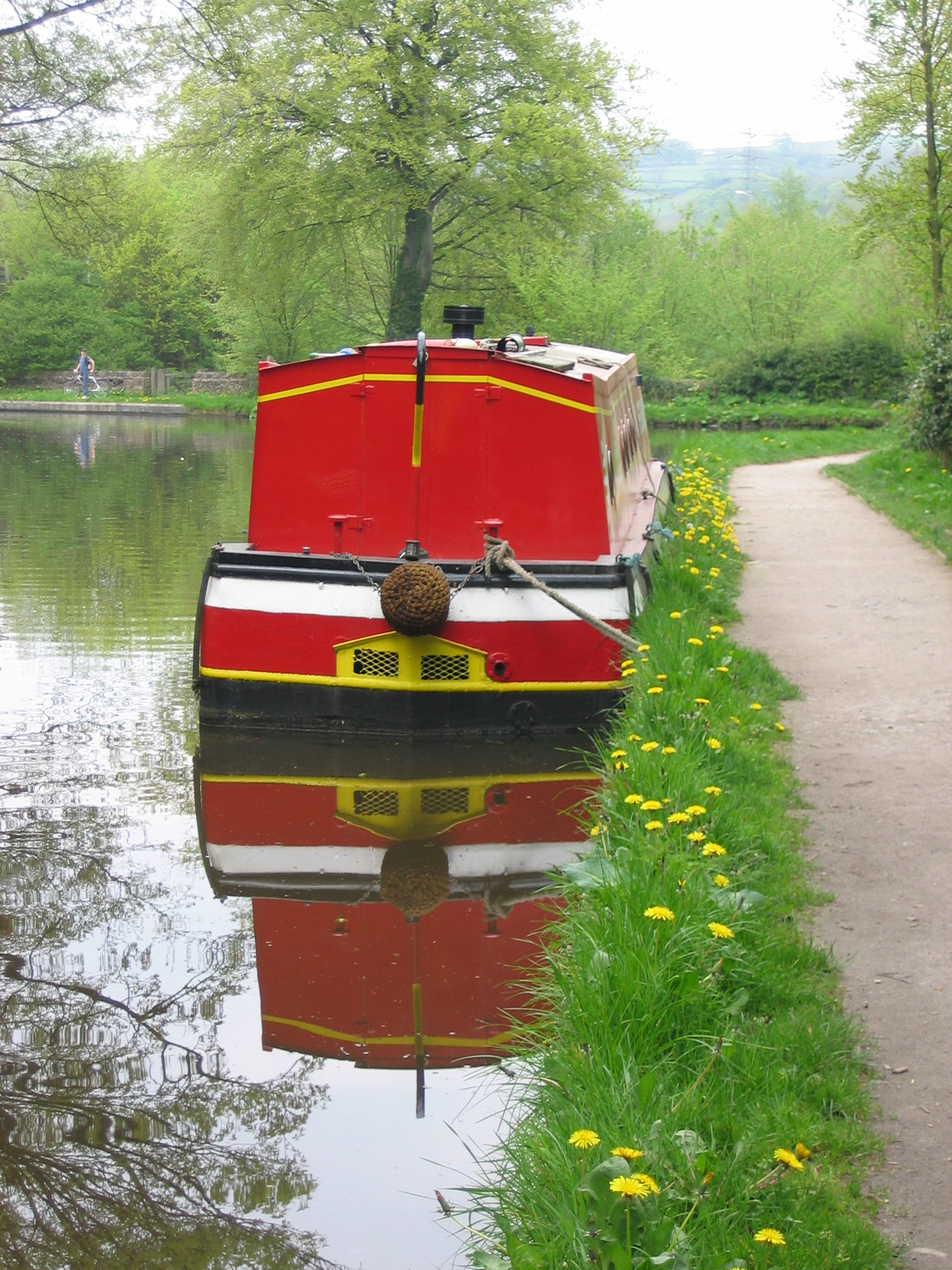
- Peak Forest Canal, Whaley Bridge
- Founded: 1946
- Founders: L. T. C. Rolt; Robert Aickman; Charles Hadfield; Frank Eyre
- Registration no.: 212342
- Purpose: British canals and river navigations
- Headquarters: Chesham, Buckinghamshire, England
- Region served: United Kingdom
- Website: Official website

The Inland Waterways Association (IWA) is a registered charity in the United Kingdom which was formed in 1946 to campaign for the conservation, use, maintenance, restoration and sensitive development of British canals and river navigations.

Notable founding members included L. T. C. Rolt and Robert Aickman.

== History ==
=== Formation ===
In 1944, Tom Rolt published his book Narrow Boat, which reflected on his journey around the canals in 1939 in his boat Cressy. The book was popular and Rolt received a number of letters following its publication. One letter came from Robert Aickman, a literary agent and aspiring author, who made the suggestion that a society to campaign for the regeneration of canals should be formed.

Tom Rolt supported this idea and on Saturday 11 August 1945, he, Robert and their wives, Angela and Ray, met for the first time aboard Cressy at Tardebigge on the Worcester & Birmingham Canal. The couples developed a good working relationship, and the inaugural meeting of The Inland Waterways Association took place on 15 February 1946 at Aickman's flat in Gower Street, London. Robert Aickman was appointed chairman, Charles Hadfield, vice-chairman, Tom Rolt honorary secretary and Frank Eyre treasurer.

A pamphlet called "The Future of the Waterways" was produced by Rolt. The first action took place in 1947, when the Rolts aboard Cressy challenged the Great Western Railway who owned the Stratford-upon-Avon Canal and had replaced the Lifford drawbridge at Kings Norton Junction with a "temporary" fixed bridge that prevented navigation. After a question in Parliament by Lord Methuen, the bridge was raised to allow Cressy to pass. An Inland Waterways exhibition was organised at Heal's Mansard Gallery in London which was so successful that it was taken on a month-long tour of provincial art galleries.

By then, IWA had attracted a range of talent, including as president the writer and parliamentarian Sir A. P. Herbert, and as vice-president the naturalist Peter Scott. Scott's wife Elizabeth Jane Howard was part-time secretary, working in the Aickmans' flat in Gower Street. The council included Lord Bingham.

In 1948, most canals in Great Britain were nationalised under the British Transport Commission. In August of that year a more extensive campaign took place: the Ailsa Craig was hired for a six-week cruise of the northern canals, which included probably the last crossing of the Huddersfield Narrow Canal before its restoration in 2001. The first boat rally and festival was organized at Market Harborough in August 1950, a meeting place open to boats wide and narrow from south and north of England and off the busier commercial routes. 120 boats and 50,000 visitors attended and this laid the foundation for the IWA National Festival, held almost ever year from 1953 to 2013.

The 1950 Market Harborough rally was overshadowed by a row among the organizers. Tom Rolt had resigned as secretary some months before because of the pressure of his other work as a writer, though remaining an active member. His next book, The Inland Waterways of England was also due to be published in August, though Rolt said that was a coincidence as he did not tell the publisher of the rally that had been organized. Aickman, through Eyre, attempted to prevent Rolt from attending the rally and promoting his book but this only led to the publisher Philip Unwin also attending. There had been personality conflicts with Aickman which had led Charles Hadfield to resign his position as vice-chairman as early as 1946, and disagreements over policy. Aickman wanted to campaign to keep all of the waterways open, whereas Rolt had more sympathies with the traditional canal workers and realised that it was necessary to prioritize which canals could reasonably be kept open. Aickman engineered a change to the rules to require all members to conform to agreed IWA principles and in early 1951, Rolt, Hadfield and others were excluded from membership.

=== 1950s: Stemming the flow ===
During most of the 1950s, IWA was campaigning in an era when the British Transport Commission (BTC) had the commercial use of the canal system as its main goal. The country did not have enough money to spend on canal maintenance, let alone restoration. The canals, particularly the narrow system, had become inadequate for modern commerce and slowly fell into disuse.

An early attempt at involvement in saving a canal, when the Basingstoke Canal came up for sale in 1949, was frustrated when a committee set up to save it saw their contributions used to support a private bid from their nominated bidder. A more hopeful start was made on the lower reaches of the Warwickshire Avon, a river where commercial navigation had long since ceased because of perennial flooding problems, thus it was not within the BTC's remit. Learning from the experience with the Basingstoke Canal, IWA advised the formation of a charitable trust and Douglas Barwell – who had joined the Midlands branch with this in mind – took charge of the restoration project.

Local campaigns emerged to counter the threats to various canals, including the Oxford and Kennet and Avon. An all-party parliamentary committee was set up, with 30 sympathetic MPs becoming honorary members of IWA. A fight to save the Stroudwater Navigation was lost in Parliament, although 112 MPs voted against it.

In March 1955, a Board of Survey reported and recommended the downgrading and possible disposal of 771 miles of waterways, including some, such as the Huddersfield Narrow Canal, that had already been abandoned and closed to traffic. In response, IWA advocated a National Waterway Conservancy to look after all the waterways and pointed out that it is cheaper to restore and use waterways than to eliminate them. A non-party parliamentary petition was also organized. Slowly, opinions were changed, so that by the autumn, when the annual BTC bill was placed before Parliament, the announced measure was not included and the chair of BTC told MPs that he regretted that the board had not had a more independent basis.

The campaign to save the Kennet and Avon Canal intensified. A group supporting its restoration had set up independently after the argument within the association but were now brought back within IWA. A 22,000-signature petition to the Queen was brought from Bristol by water, though stretches of the canal had to be traversed by canoe to get it through. In March 1956, a clause in the BTC bill to close the K&A was defeated.

A new committee of enquiry was set up and the IWA was invited, amongst others, to give detailed plans for the viability of various waterways, which put considerable strain on an organisation which did not at the time have a permanent staff and whose financial affairs were in some disarray. Christopher Clifford, a JP, made the presentation. Another dispute arose within the organisation when Aickman pushed to seek incorporation as a company limited by guarantee. At the time there was no chairman of the council, as Aickman had been persuaded to keep only the position of founder and vice-president after the last crisis, and he had been ordered to rest by his doctor. Although the motion was eventually passed, and the IWA was incorporated in 1958, several branches broke away from the organisation.

=== Canal restoration begins ===
In Warwickshire, work on the Lower Avon was nearing completion after a decade of hard work and it was confirmed that nobody owned the rights to the upper reaches which led to Stratford-upon-Avon. The prospect of a connection from the Severn through to the Midlands was in sight but was in jeopardy when the Stratford-upon-Avon Canal was threatened with abandonment.

In 1958, John Smith, a banker and company director who was an IWA member and had an honorary post in the National Trust, suggested that organisation might take over the canal. Another enthusiastic member, David Hutchings, took up the task of restoration after the National Trust agreed a five-year lease on the canal a year later, pointing out that the cost of filling it in would be £120,000 whereas the cost of restoration would be £40,000. Restoration was completed on schedule despite the extremely cold winter of 1962–3. The reopening coincided with the 400th anniversary celebration of Shakespeare's birth at Stratford-upon-Avon, and the Aickmans accompanied the Queen Mother in a much-publicized narrow-boat trip to reopen the canal and its connection with the river, as part of a large festival that saw 200 boats on the river outside the Royal Shakespeare Theatre.

The experience of restoration led to the creation of the Waterway Recovery Group, led by Graham Palmer, at the 1970 Guildford IWA Rally. At first independent, this organisation acts as a co-ordinating force, providing equipment, expertise, publicity and labour to help local restoration schemes. They organise weekend and longer work camps where volunteers can take part in practical restoration work and have been involved in many projects – including saving the Peak Forest and Ashton canals from closure, work on the Kennet and Avon Canal, and the barge lock on the Droitwich Canal – as well as making flying visits to restoration sites. The group is a subsidiary of the Inland Waterways Association.

=== 1960s: A new order emerges ===
The government set up an Inland Waterways Redevelopment Advisory Committee in 1961 to consider the future of canals that were not considered viable. Two IWA stalwarts, John Smith and Lionel Munk, were included on this, together with Tom Rolt. This went against Aickman's slogan of "fighting for every mile", although shortly afterward he admitted privately to Lionel Munk that he was now a "90% man". As commercial use of the canals was declining rapidly, requests for closures came in thick and fast from British Transport Waterways, which was soon to be separated from the BTC as the British Waterways Board (BWB).

Aickman and Hadfield (who now joined the BWB) had argued that the canals should be run by a trust such as the National Trust, but the new body faced the same commercial pressures as its predecessors. The Transport Act 1968 showed a new commitment to amenity use, and waterways were put into three classes: commercial, cruising and remainder. One casualty of this was the Kennet and Avon which remained in the bottom category, for which only essential maintenance was available. The act also removed the statutory right of navigation for these canals.

The 1970s and 1980s are characterised as "three steps forward, two steps back" by David Blagrove. Canal restorations and growth in the leisure boat industry were offset by numerous setbacks including closures of canals, tunnel failures and the breakdown of the Anderton lift. However, the attitude of BWB gradually changed from scepticism to a more friendly attitude to the organisation.

=== Since 1990 ===
The completion of the restored Kennet and Avon Canal in 1990 and the availability of National Lottery funding from 1994 opened up new possibilities. The membership, which had steadily expanded during the previous decades, settled at around 20,000 and the annual rallies and festivals kept their popularity.

== Organisation and governance ==
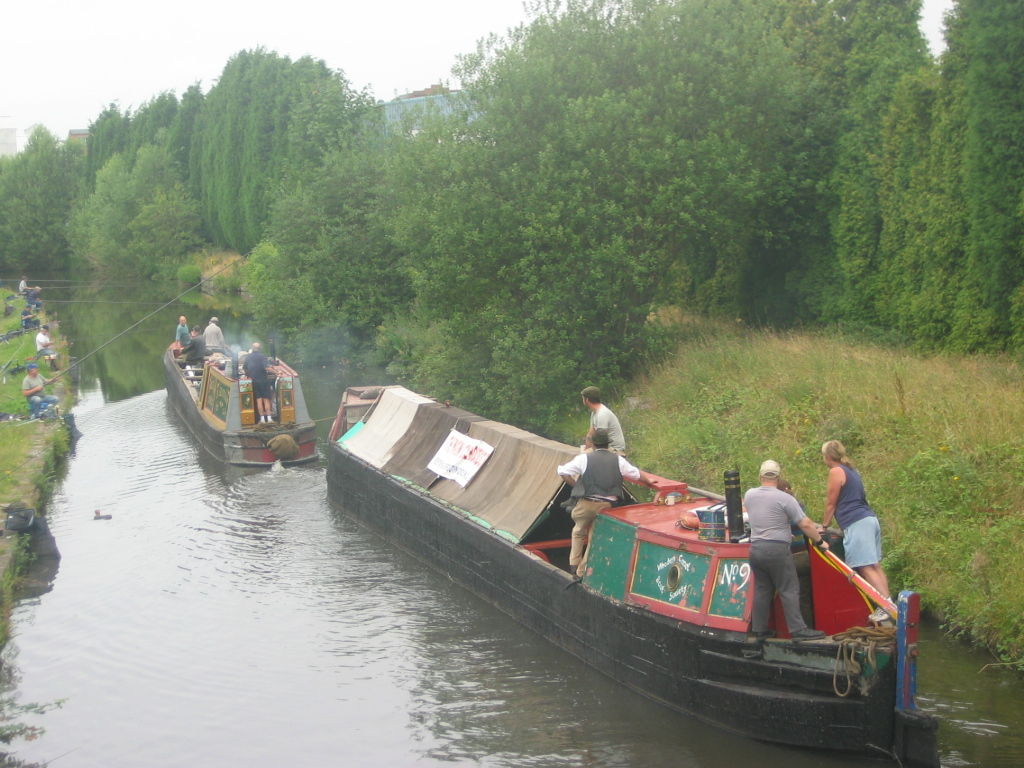
Former working boats, 2008

IWA is organised into regions, each of which consist of several branches. The regions are: East Midlands, Eastern, London, North East & Yorkshire, North West & North Wales, South East, South West & South Wales, and West Midlands.

The association is governed by a board of trustees. There are a number of national committees, each reporting to the board of trustees. For each committee there is an agreed role and operating arrangements, with areas of delegated responsibility. The national committees are Finance Committee, Navigation Committee, Waterway Recovery Group, Marketing Committee, Remuneration Committee, and the Awards Panel.

In 2017, the IWA set up a Restoration Hub which provides advice and support to groups working on canal restoration.

=== Chairs ===
- January 2024 to present – Mike Wills
- September 2023 to January 2024 – Vacant
- May 2022 to September 2023 – Les Etheridge
- November 2019 to April 2022 – Paul Rodgers
- October 2017 to November 2019 – Ivor Caplan
- October 2012 to October 2017 – Les Etheridge
- October 2008 to October 2012 – Clive Henderson
- October 2002 to October 2008 – John Fletcher
- October 1998 to October 2002 – Richard Drake
- October 1994 to October 1998 – Audrey Smith
- October 1989 to October 1994 – David Stevenson
- October 1982 to October 1989 – Ken Goodwin
- October 1972 to October 1982 – John Heap
- April 1972 to October 1972 – Lionel Munk
- August 1970 to April 1972 – John Humphries
- 1958 (incorporation) to August 1970 – Lionel Munk

== Activities ==
IWA is a volunteer-led membership charity that campaigns for the waterways. Members can get involved with local and national committees to debate and influence policies and campaigns.

The charity formulates policies and undertakes local and national campaigns to work on specific issues that have, or may in the future, have a real impact on the UK's inland waterways.

IWA works closely with navigation authorities such as Canal & River Trust, the Environment Agency, and other smaller navigation authorities. The association seeks to maintain good relationships with navigation authorities in order to influence policy and decision-making, acting in the best interests of IWA members and the waterways. IWA also works with other waterway bodies, a wide range of national and local authorities, voluntary, private and public sector organisations.

IWA actively supports waterway restoration by providing expert advice and grants. IWA's Waterway Recovery Group organises and subsidises waterway restoration holiday schemes for volunteers around the country, and its regional groups carry out restoration work most weekends.

=== IWA as Navigation Authority ===
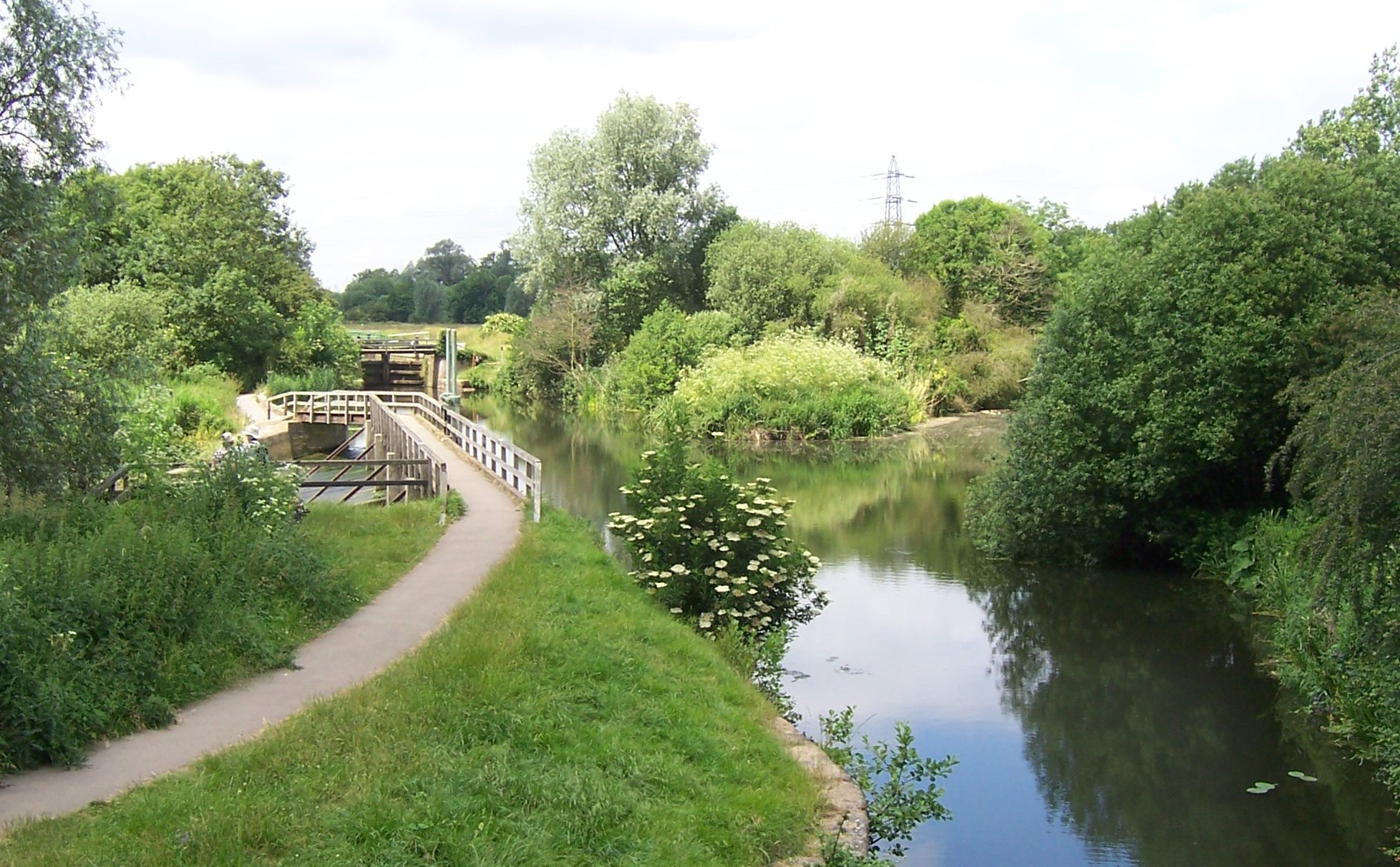
Chelmer and Blackwater Navigation

In November 2005, IWA signed a maintenance and operating agreement with the Administrator of The Company of Proprietors of the Chelmer & Blackwater Navigation Ltd, whereby IWA was responsible for the navigation in perpetuity. The Chelmsford Branch of the IWA had worked closely with the C&BNCo from 1994 until it went into administration in August 2003.

IWA has formed a subsidiary company, Essex Waterways Ltd, and, with support from local authorities, operates and maintained the navigation for the benefit of the general public. This was the first time that IWA has taken full operational and maintenance responsibilities for a navigation.

On 31 March 2025 IWA's share in Essex Waterways Ltd was transferred to a new charity, Essex Waterways Navigation Trust

=== IWA National Festival ===
IWA Rally at Beale Park, 2006

The association has organised 60 editions of the IWA National Festival & Boat Show, run entirely by volunteers. These regularly attracted large numbers of boats and visitors. For example, the rally at Beale Park in 2006 on the Thames above Reading had 600 boats and 28,000 visitors.

=== IWA National Campaign Festival ===
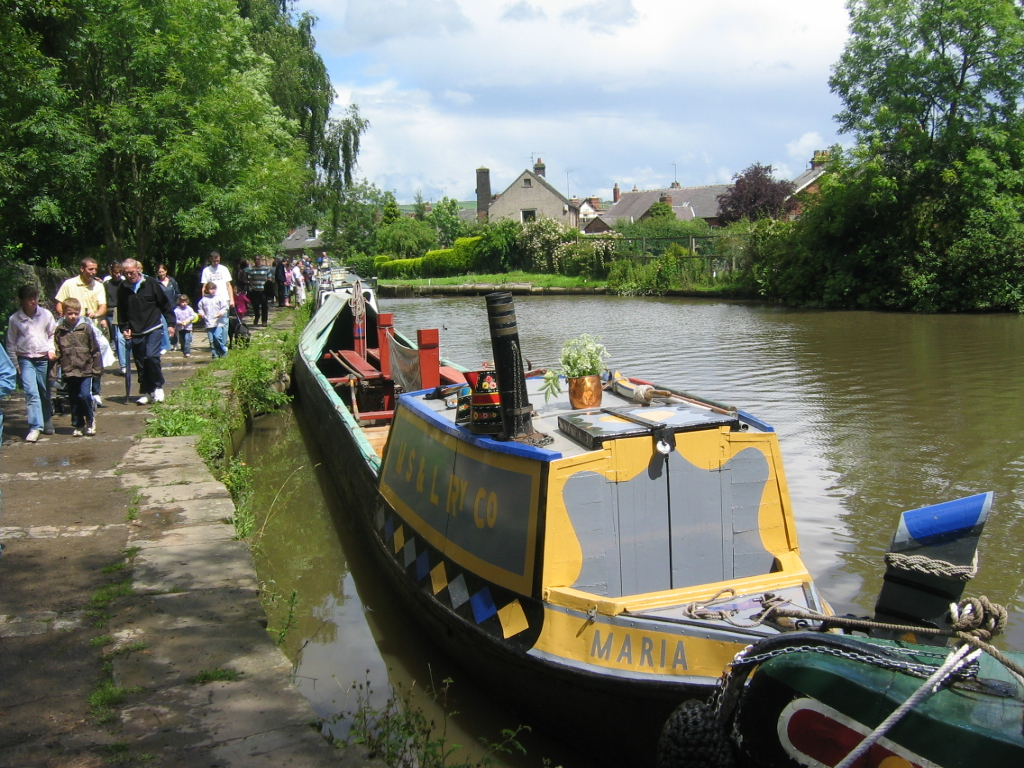
NB Maria, Peak Forest Canal, England

The Campaign Festival has been an integral part of IWA activities since its inception. Bringing a large number of boats to a particular waterway highlights the difficulties of navigation and has kept a number of waterways open that would otherwise have closed.

In the past, the annual festival often had campaigning as one of its functions, but the number of boats attending makes many desirable venues impracticable. So, together with campaign rallies held by particular regions, a national campaign rally was established in 2006 to highlight the continued need for this activity.

==== Past events ====
- 2016 – Eldonian Village
- 2014 – Chester
- 2009 – Kiveton Park, Chesterfield Canal
- 2008 – "Monty '08", theme: Montgomery Canal restoration
- 2006 – Basingstoke Canal

=== IWA National Trailboat Festival ===
==== Past events ====
- 2024 – Moira, Ashby Canal
- 2023 – None – No hosting organisation
- 2022 – None – No hosting organisation
- 2021 – Cancelled – Covid pandemic
- 2020 – Cancelled – Covid pandemic
- 2019 – Crooklands, Lancaster Canal
- 2018 – None – No hosting organisation
- 2017 – Moira, Ashby Canal
- 2016 – Staveley, Chesterfield Canal
- 2015 – Crooklands, Lancaster Canal
- 2014 – Tiverton, Grand Western Canal, Devon
- 2013 – Bodiam Castle, River Rother, East Sussex
- 2012 – Stroud, Gloucestershire
- 2011 – Resolven, Neath Canal, South Wales
- 2010 – Newport, Monmouthshire Canal, South Wales
- 2009 – Moira, Ashby Canal
- 2008 – Tiverton, Grand Western Canal, Devon
- 2007 – Grantham, Grantham Canal
- 2006 – Crooklands, Lancaster Canal
- 2005 – Tapton Lock, Chesterfield Canal
- 2004 – Newport, Monmouth & Brecon Canal
- 2003 – Sunbury, Stour Navigation
- 2002 – Tapton Lock, Chesterfield Canal
- 2001 – None – Foot and mouth pandemic
- 2000 – Moira, Ashby Canal

=== IWA Canalway Cavalcade ===
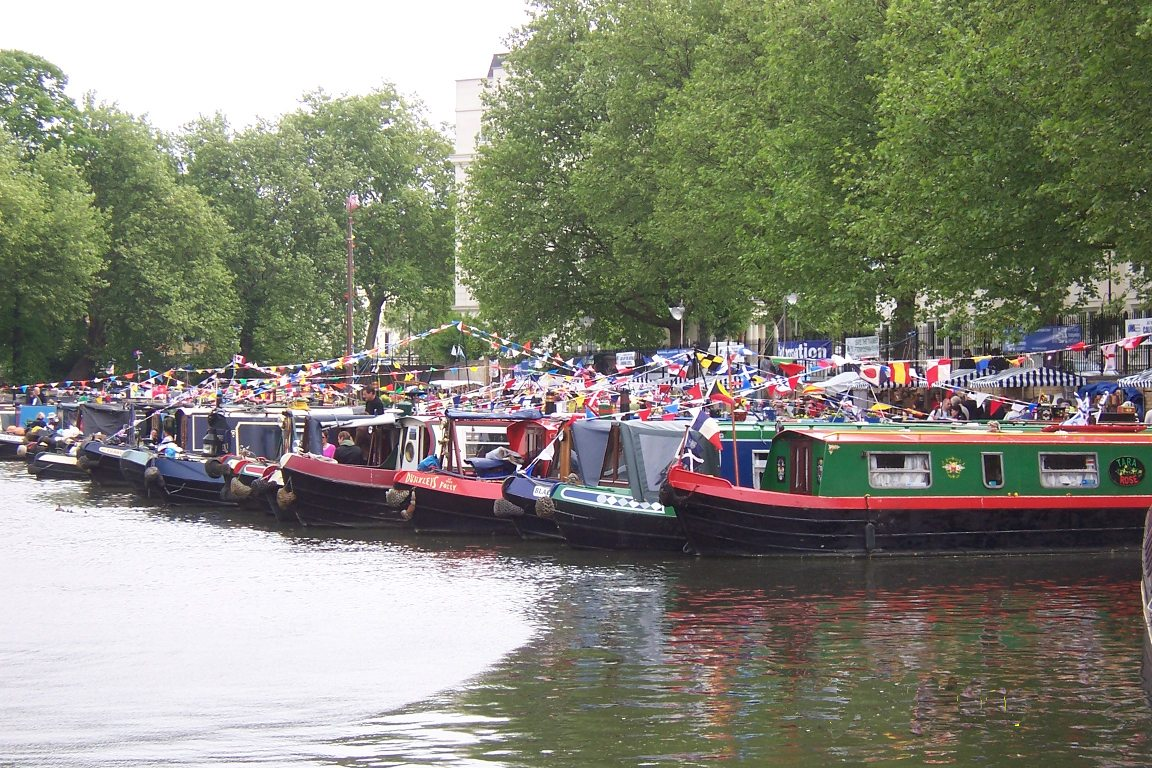
Canalway Cavalcade at Little Venice, May 2005

An annual event since 1983, organised by IWA at Little Venice, London over the early May Bank Holiday weekend, combining a boat rally with a trade show, activities and entertainments.

== Plaques ==
Two plaques commemorating the 1945 meeting which led to founding of the IWA stand at Tardebigge Top Lock on the Worcester and Birmingham Canal. In 2015, the Inland Waterways Association unveiled a plaque commemorating the life and work of its co-founder and first chairman, Robert Aickman, at his home and workplace at 11 Gower Street, London.

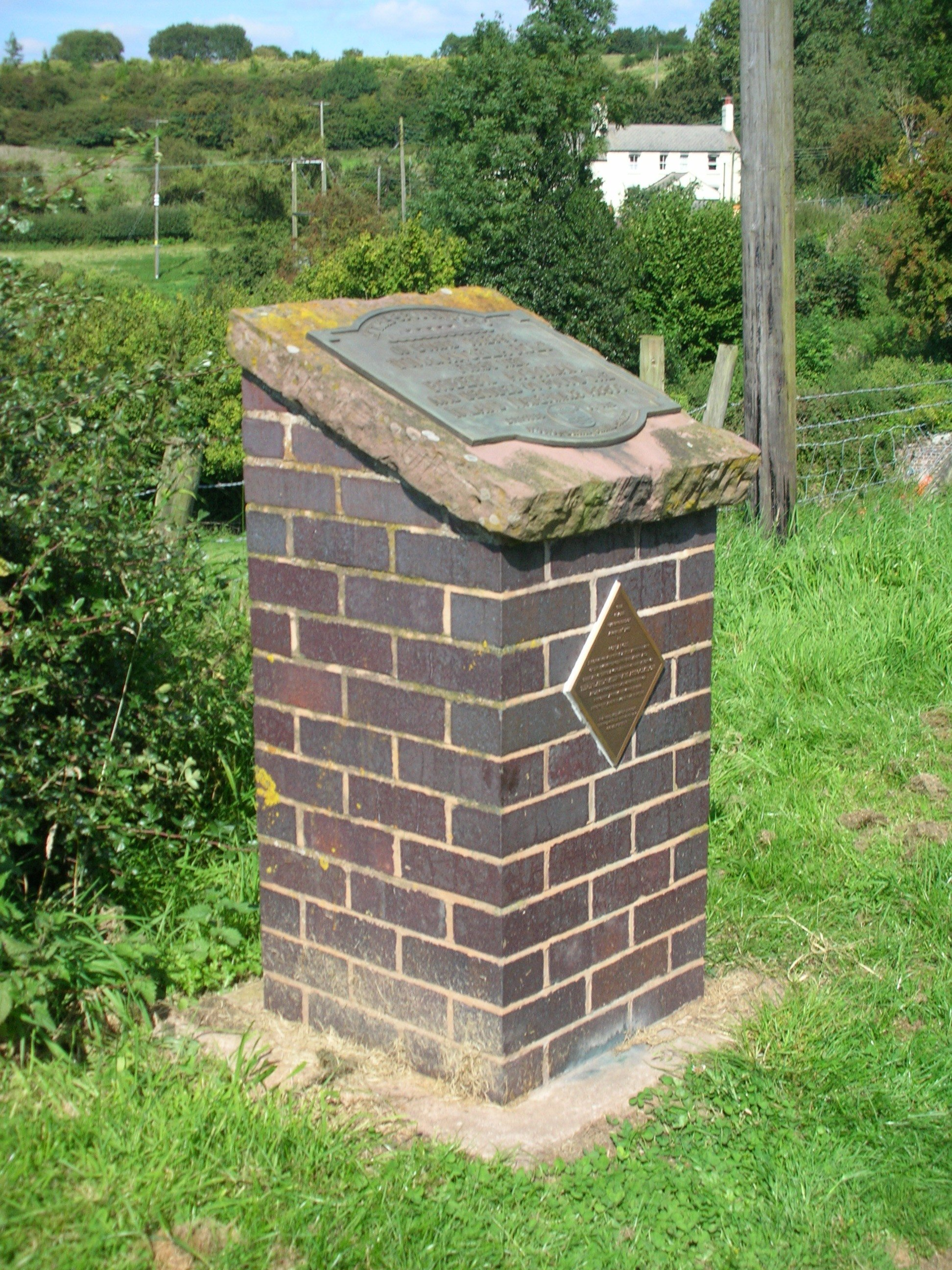
Inland Waterways Association plaques at Tardebigge top lock

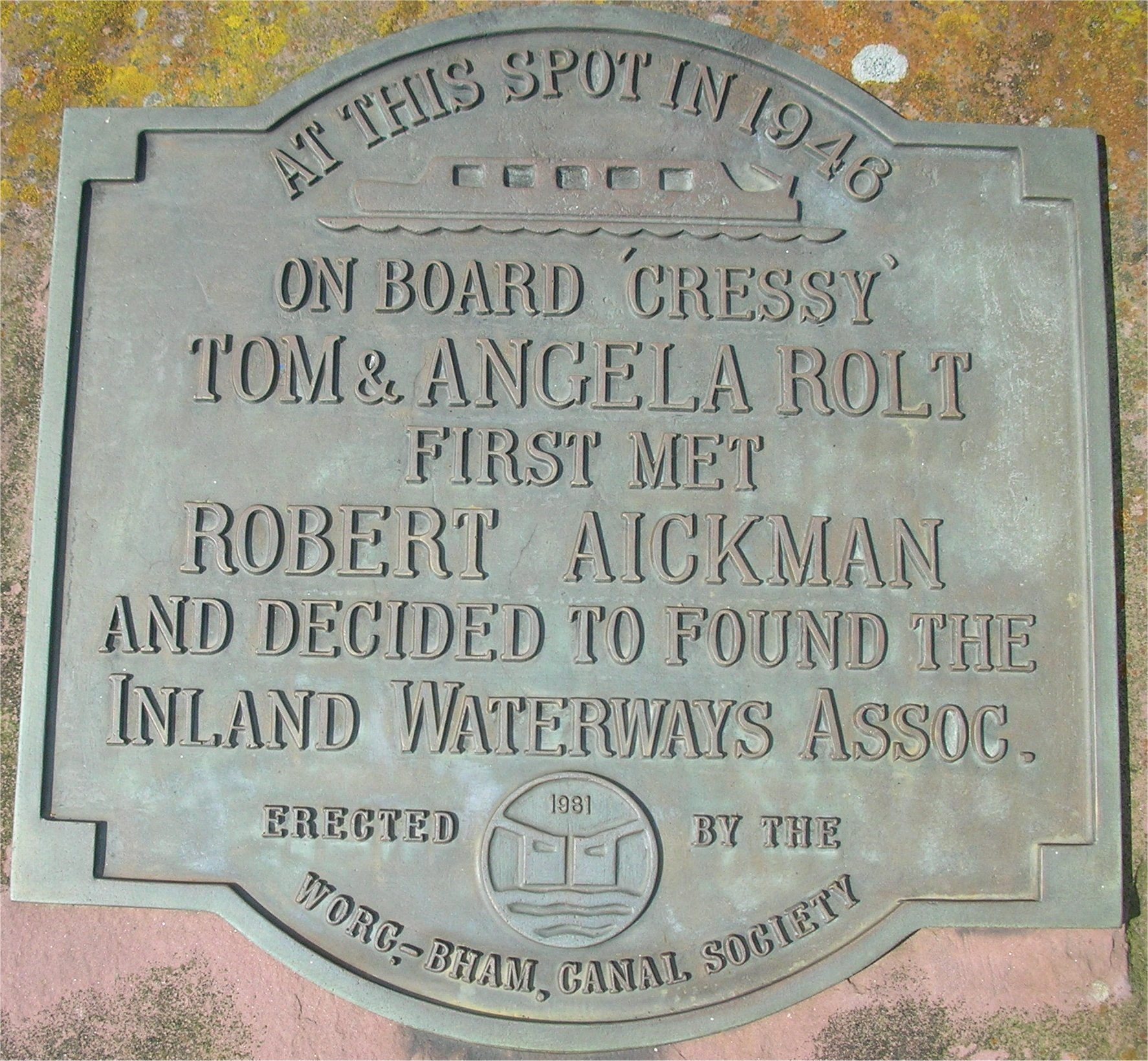
IWA plaque 1981 with incorrect date of meeting

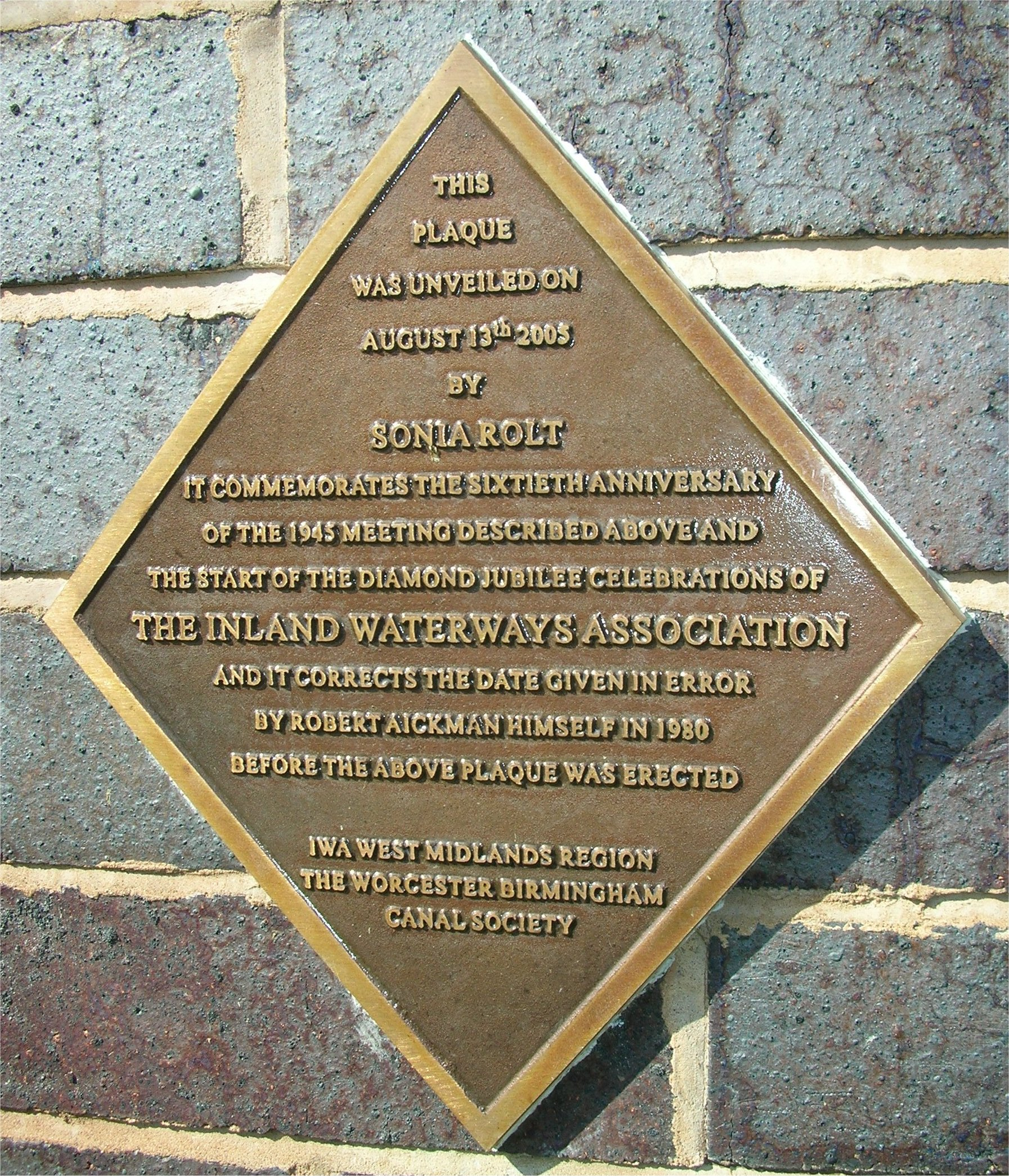
IWA plaque 2005 with correct date

== See also ==
- List of navigation authorities in the United Kingdom
- List of waterway societies in the United Kingdom
- Inland Waterways Protection Society
