= Litchfield =

Litchfield may refer to:

== Places ==
=== Antarctica ===
- Litchfield Island, Palmer Archipelago

=== Australia ===
- Litchfield Municipality, a local government area in the Northern Territory
- Litchfield National Park, a park in the Northern Territory
- Litchfield Station, a cattle station in the Northern Territory

=== Canada ===
- Litchfield, Nova Scotia, a community
- Litchfield, Quebec, a municipality

=== United Kingdom ===
- Litchfield, Hampshire, England, a village
- Litchfield Street, a street in Westminster, London

=== United States ===
- Litchfield Park, Arizona, a city
- Litchfield, California, a census-designated place
- Litchfield, Connecticut, a town
- Litchfield (borough), Connecticut, a borough
- Litchfield County, Connecticut, a county
- Litchfield Hills, the northwestern region of Connecticut
- Litchfield, Illinois, a city
- Litchfield, Kansas, an unincorporated community
- Litchfield, Maine, a town
- Litchfield, Michigan, a city
- Litchfield, Minnesota, a city
- Litchfield, Nebraska, a village
- Litchfield, New Hampshire, a town
- Litchfield, New York, a town
- Litchfield, Ohio, an unincorporated community
- Litchfield Beach, South Carolina, a census-designated place
- Litchfield Plantation, a historic rice plantation located in Pawleys Island, South Carolina
- Litchfield Township (disambiguation)

== Education ==
- Litchfield Academy, in Litchfield, Maine; defunct
- Litchfield Female Academy, in Litchfield, Connecticut; defunct
- Litchfield High School (disambiguation)
- Litchfield Law School, in Litchfield, Connecticut
- Litchfield Towers, a student residence at the University of Pittsburgh

== Other uses ==
- Litchfield (surname)
- The Litchfield Company, an American real estate development company
- Litchfield Federal Penitentiary, a fictional prison in the television series Orange Is the New Black
- Litchfield Municipal Airport (disambiguation)
- Litchfield Observatory, Hamilton College, New York
- Litchfield Villa, Brooklyn, New York
- USS Litchfield (DD-336)

== See also ==
- Litchfield Park (disambiguation)
- Lichfield (disambiguation)
- Litch (disambiguation)
- Lich (disambiguation)
