= Lichfield (disambiguation) =

Lichfield is a city in Staffordshire, England.

Lichfield may also refer to:

== Associated with the English city ==
- Lichfield Cathedral
- Lichfield City railway station
- Lichfield Trent Valley railway station
- Lichfield (district), a local government district
- Lichfield (UK Parliament constituency)
- Lichfield and Tamworth (UK Parliament constituency)
- Earl of Lichfield, a peerage
- Countess of Lichfield (disambiguation), including a list of women who have held the title
- Lichfield Canal
- Lichfield Cricket Club
- Lichfield Gospels, an eighth century book of the Gospels
- Diocese of Lichfield
  - Archdeacon of Lichfield
  - Bishop of Lichfield
  - Dean of Lichfield, including a list of people who have held the title

== People ==
- Nathaniel Lichfield (1916–2009), British urban and environmental planner
- Paul W. Litchfield (1875–1959), American inventor, industrialist, and author
- Richard Lichfield (died 1630), British surgeon
- Patrick Anson, 5th Earl of Lichfield (1939–2005), English photographer
- Thomas Lichfield (died 1586), English politician

== Other uses ==
- Lichfield, New Zealand, a New Zealand settlement named after the English city
- HMS Lichfield, several ships
- RAF Lichfield, in Fradley, Staffordshire, England

== See also ==
- Lichfield House (disambiguation)
- Litchfield (disambiguation)
- Litch (disambiguation)
- Lich (disambiguation)
