= Lichfield & Hatherton Canals Restoration Trust =

British waterway restoration charity

Lichfield and Hatherton Canals Restoration Trust (often abbreviated LHCRT) is a registered charity and volunteer organisation in England dedicated to the restoration and reopening of the Lichfield Canal and the Hatherton Canal. The Trust’s goal is to re-establish a navigable connection between the canals, enhance biodiversity, and provide local recreational and educational benefits.

== History ==
The Trust was established in 1989 (originally as the Ogley and Hatherton Restoration Society) to advance the restoration of the disused canals linking Ogley Junction with Huddlesford Junction (Lichfield Canal) and reconnecting the Hatherton Branch with the Wyrley and Essington Canal. The organisation’s stated mission is to restore the historic waterways and create a “green and blue corridor” for navigation, leisure, and wildlife.

== Organisation and governance ==
The Trust is registered as a charity (No. 702429) and as a company limited by guarantee (No. 02456172). Its offices are located at St John’s Court, Wiltell Road, Lichfield, Staffordshire. LHCRT is entirely volunteer-led, with restoration, fundraising, and administration managed by members and community supporters. The Trust upholds policies on health and safety, equality and diversity, safeguarding, environmental management, and education.

== Activities and achievements ==
The Trust has undertaken major restoration works along several key sites of the Lichfield Canal, including Tamworth Road, Darnford Lane, Fosseway Heath, and Gallows Reach.

- At Darnford Lane, LHCRT installed a steel lift bridge originally from the Peak Forest Canal and reinstated canal lining and earthworks.
- At Tamworth Road, volunteers rebuilt Locks 25 and 26 and rewatered part of the channel.
- In 2015, the Trust received a £336,000 grant under a Social Investment Business scheme, enabling land acquisition and construction of the M6 aqueduct section.
- In October 2024, Staffordshire County Council transferred about a 670 metre stretch of land on Falkland Road to the Trust, enabling the creation of a new culvert under Claypit Lane and the construction of three locks. This acquisition also links to a canal culvert beneath the Birmingham Road island built during the Lichfield Southern Bypass works.
- In parallel, housing developer Persimmon Homes handed over a plot adjacent to its St John’s Grange development to LHCRT, facilitating the extension of restoration works from Gallows Reach through this junction area.
- In September 2025, the Trust was awarded a £200,000 grant from the **Community Infrastructure Levy (CIL)** fund by Lichfield District Council for Phase 2 of the **Gallows Reach** section, supporting the restoration of a 225-metre canal stretch and the creation of a new pedestrian route linking local housing developments.

== Public engagement ==
The Trust runs volunteer programmes for individuals, groups, and corporate teams, including opportunities for participants in the Duke of Edinburgh's Award. LHCRT also hosts public open days, community events, and school visits, and collaborates with the Waterway Recovery Group on training and work camps. The organisation publishes regular updates, videos, and interactive maps on its website and social media channels to share restoration progress and promote environmental awareness.

== Challenges and future plans ==
The Trust faces ongoing challenges such as acquiring land along the canal route, securing continuous funding, and engineering solutions for road crossings like the M6 Toll aqueduct. It continues to work with local authorities, the Canal & River Trust, and community partners to complete the restoration and integrate both canals into the wider inland waterway network.

== See also ==
- Lichfield Canal
- Hatherton Canal
- Canal restoration
