= Horseley Fields Junction =

Canal junction in Wolverhampton, West Midlands, England

Coordinates: 52°35′07″N 2°06′48″W

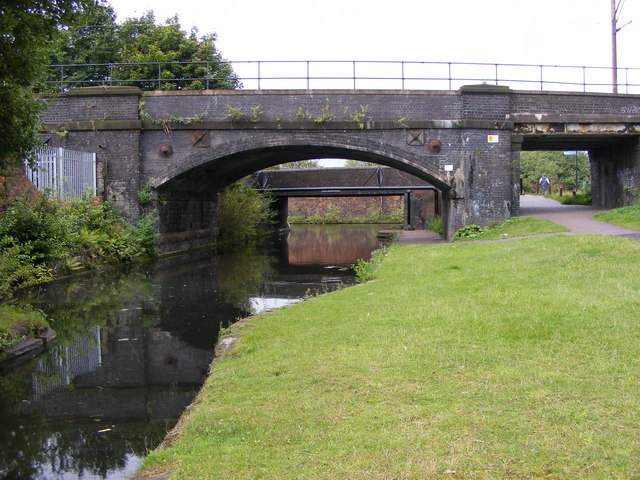
- The second bridge carries the BCN Main Line towpath over the Wyrley and Essington Canal
- Interactive map of Horseley Fields Junction

Specifications
- Status: Open
- Navigation authority: British Waterways

History
- Date completed: 1797

Horseley Fields Junction (grid reference SO923986) is a canal junction at the western limit of the Wyrley and Essington Canal where it meets the BCN Main Line, at Horseley Fields east of Wolverhampton, in the West Midlands, England.

== History ==
The first canal into Birmingham was authorised by an Act of Parliament in 1768. It was designed by James Brindley and was a contour canal, weaving its way across the landscape in an attempt to stay on one level. It was to run from Gas Street Basin to Aldersley Junction, where it would join another of Brindley's Canals, the Staffordshire and Worcestershire Canal, which was under construction at the same time, and would link the Trent and Mersey Canal to the River Severn at Stourport on Severn. The line was finished through to Wednesbury, where there were coal mines, by 1769, and the link to Aldersley Junction, which included a flight of twenty locks, later increased by one, and passing through Horseley Fields, was completed in 1772. The Birmingham Canal company became the Birmingham Canal Navigations (BCN), following an amalgamation with the Birmingham and Fazeley Canal in 1794.

The Wyrley and Essington Canal was planned to serve the coal mines at Sneyd and Essington, bringing coal to the population of Wolverhampton and Walsall. It was authorised in 1792, and from Sneyd Junction, where the canal headed northwards to the collieries, the main line ran to the west to meet the Birmingham Canal at Horseley Fields, while a branch ran to the east to Birchills Junction, near Walsall. Construction started, but in 1794, the company obtained a second Act, which effectively made the Birchills Branch into the main line, and extended it to Ogley Junction, after which it descended through 30 locks to reach the Coventry Canal at Huddlesford Junction. The whole canal, including the junction at Horseley Fields, opened on 8 May 1797.

The Birmingham Canal Navigations approached the Wyrley and Essington in 1820, with a view to amalgamation, but the offer was refused. The reverse happened in 1838, but in 1840, they agreed. An informal agreement signed on 9 February 1840 was followed by an Act of Parliament to authorise the union in April. Horseley Junction became an internal junction between parts of the BCN system from that date, and its importance diminished a little, as three other junctions were created between the two canals in the years immediately after amalgamation.

== Location ==
From the junction, the line to Aldersley Junction heads north-west, and is level for just 0.5 miles (0.8 km) before the top lock of the 21-lock Wolverhampton flight is reached. The bottom lock is almost at the junction. In the opposite direction, the canal is level for 11.4 miles (18.3 km) to Smethwick Junction passing along the Old Main Line between Factory Junction and Spon Lane Junction. The route is crossed by the A454 road at Horesley Fields Bridge immediately to the south of the junction. The third route, following the Wyrley and Essington Canal to the north-east is crossed by a towpath bridge and a railway bridge at the junction, and is level for 17.7 miles (28.5 km), to Anglesey Basin on the edge of Chasewater Reservoir. The only locks on this canal were the 30 that descended from Ogley Junction through Lichfield to Huddlesford Junction on the Coventry Canal. They were closed in 1954, but are the subject of an active restoration project, and that section has been renamed as the Lichfield Canal.

== See also ==
- Canals of the United Kingdom
- History of the British canal system

== Bibliography ==
- Cumberlidge, Jane (2009). Inland Waterways of Great Britain (8th Ed.). Imray Laurie Norie and Wilson. ISBN 978-1-84623-010-3.
- Hadfield, Charles (1985). The Canals of the West Midlands. David and Charles. ISBN 0-7153-8644-1.
- Nicholson (2003). Nicholson Guide Vol 3 - Birmingham & the Heart of England. Harper Collins. ISBN 0-00-713666-8.
- Pearson, Michael (1989). Canal Companion: Birmingham Canal Navigations. J. M. Pearson & Associates. ISBN 0-907864-49-X.
