= Birchills Junction =

Canal junction in the uk

Coordinates: 52°35′55″N 1°59′52″W

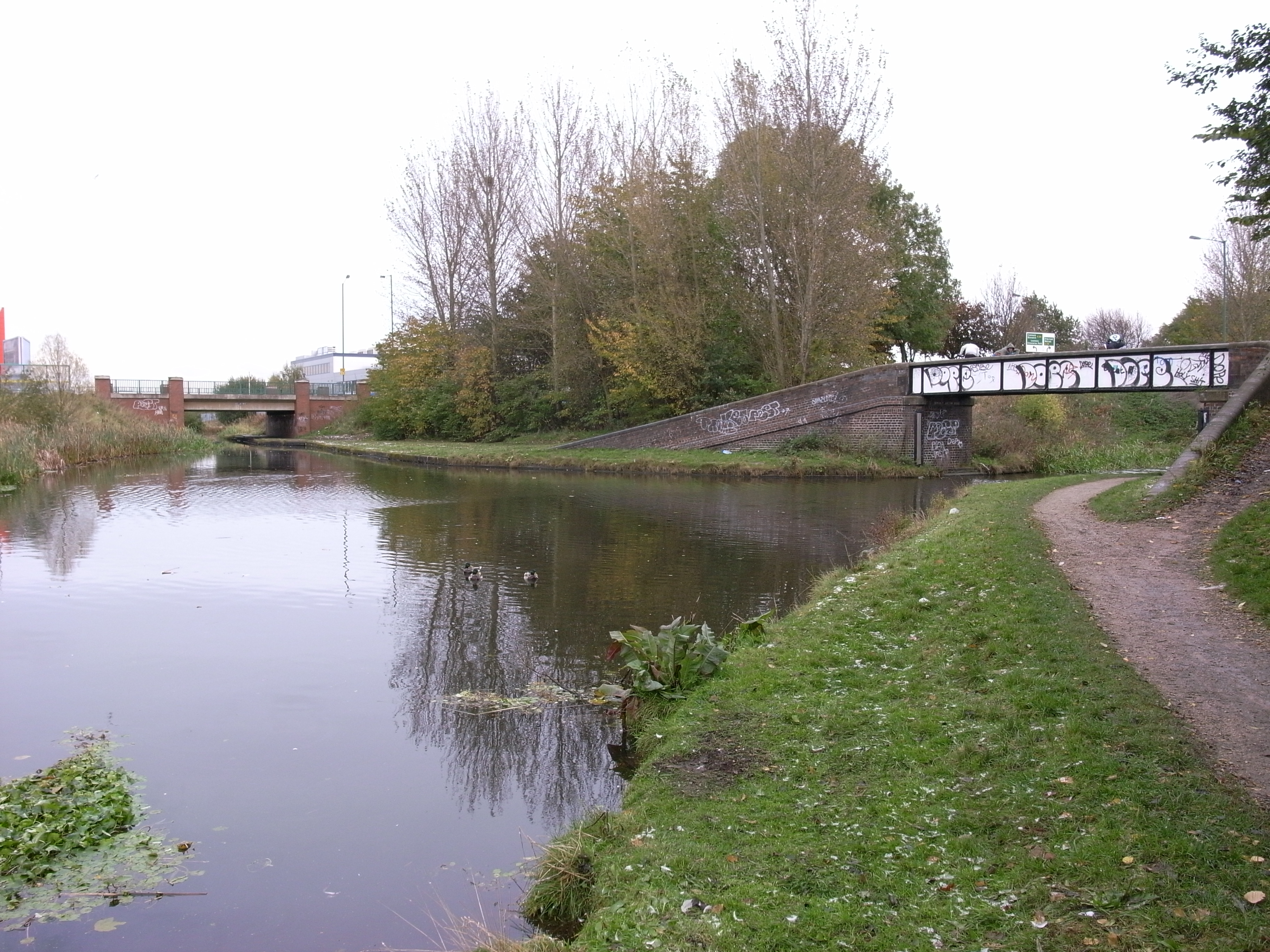
- Birchills Junction with the Walsall Canal passing through the bridge to the right.

Specifications
- Status: Open
- Navigation authority: Canal & River Trust

History
- Date completed: 1798
- Date closed: 1799
- Date restored: 1841

Birchills Junction (grid reference SK002000) is the canal junction at the northern limit of what is now called the Walsall Canal where it meets the Wyrley and Essington Canal main line, near Walsall, West Midlands, England. It opened in 1798, but lasted for little more than a year, until it was re-opened in 1841 when a connecting link was built to the Birmingham Canal Navigations' southern route to Walsall.

== History ==
The Wyrley and Essington Canal was authorised by an act of Parliament, the Birmingham Canal Navigation Act 1792 (32 Geo. 3. c. 81), as a way of delivering coal from the Wyrley and Essington coal fields to the towns of Wolverhampton to the west and Walsall to the east. The main line was to run from the coal fields down to Sneyd Junction, and continue westwards to reach the Birmingham Canal Navigations at Horseley Fields Junction, near Wolverhampton. A branch would run from Sneyd Junction eastwards to Birchills. Before construction work was complete, the company obtained a second Act in 1794, which authorised a line from near Birchills to Brownhills, passing through Bloxwich and Pelsall. From Brownhills it would drop through 30 locks on its route past Lichfield to reach Huddlesford Junction. This was on a route authorised by the Coventry Canal Act 1768 (8 Geo. 3. c. 36), but built by the Birmingham and Fazeley Canal, as part of a deal to ensure that that canal was part of a larger network and would therefore be profitable. The Wyrley and Essington main line was now considered to be the route from Horseley Fields to Birchills Junction via Sneyd Junction, and on to Huddlesford Junction. The route which climbed Wyrley Bank to the coal mines was now a branch, as was the final short section of the route between Birchills Junction and the basin where the original branch terminated.

To the south of the junction, another canal had been built in stages. Leaving the Birmingham Canal Navigations main line at Pudding Green Junction, the first part had been built by the Wednesbury Canal and opened in 1769. The next section had been built under powers contained in the Birmingham and Fazeley Canal Act 1784 (24 Geo. 3. Sess. 2. c. 4), and ran from Riders Green Junction to Broadwaters, a coal mining complex near Moxley. This opened in 1786. Plans for a link from Broadwaters to Walsall were proposed in 1793, but the route was not built until 1799. The Wyrley and Essington main line opened on 8 May 1797, and their northern branch to Walsall opened the following year. The southern route from Broadwaters opened in June 1799, and after that date, the northern branch was barely used. John Farley visited the area in 1809, and reported that the northern branch was dammed off, and had been dry for some time. Although a Mr. Willoughby attempted to get the branch reopened in 1818, no further action took place, until after the merger of the Wyrley and Essington Canal and the Birmingham Canal Navigations. A short connecting link was then built in 1841, with eight locks, to join the southern and northern branches and create a through route. The junction became operational again in 1841, and the canal to the south of it is now normally considered to be part of the Walsall Canal.

== Location ==
From the junction, the Wyrley and Essington Canal to the west is level for its entire 8 miles (13 km) to Horseley Fields Junction, where it joins the Birmingham Canal Navigations main line. In the other direction, it passes under Green Lane Bridge, which carries the A34 road over the canal, and is level for 9.3 miles (15.0 km) to Chasewater Reservoir. Ogley Junction, from where the former main line to Huddleford ran, is just over 1 mile (1.6 km) from the end, but the route was abandoned in 1954. However, it may be reopened as the Lichfield Canal, for a restoration group have been working on it for some years. The towpath on the Wyrley and Essington Canal is on the southern bank, and it crosses the start of the Walsall Canal. Immediately afterwards, Stephenson Avenue Bridge crosses, and the canal then passes over an aqueduct, which once passed over a railway line but is now dismantled. The top lock of the eight Walsall Locks, which lower the level by 65 feet (20 m), is reached after 0.4 miles (0.64 km). At the bottom of the flight is Walsall Junction, where the Walsall Canal continues straight ahead and the short Walsall Town Arm turns to the east.

== See also ==
- List of canal junctions in the United Kingdom
- List of canal aqueducts in the United Kingdom
- List of canal basins in the United Kingdom
- List of canal locks in the United Kingdom
- List of canal tunnels in the United Kingdom

== Bibliography ==
- Cumberlidge, Jane (2009). Inland Waterways of Great Britain (8th Ed.). Imray Laurie Norie and Wilson. ISBN 978-1-84623-010-3.
- Hadfield, Charles (1985). The Canals of the West Midlands. David and Charles. ISBN 0-7153-8644-1.
- Nicholson (2006). Nicholson Guide Vol 2: Severn, Avon & Birmingham. Harper Collins. ISBN 978-0-00-721110-4.
- Pearson, Michael (1989). Canal Companion - Birmingham Canal Navigations. J. M. Pearson & Associates. ISBN 0-907864-49-X.
- Shill, Ray (2002). the Birmingham Canal Navigations. Tempus Publishing. ISBN 978-0-7524-2767-6.
