= Lichfield Canal Aqueduct =

Unused aqueduct over the M6 Toll in Lichfield, England

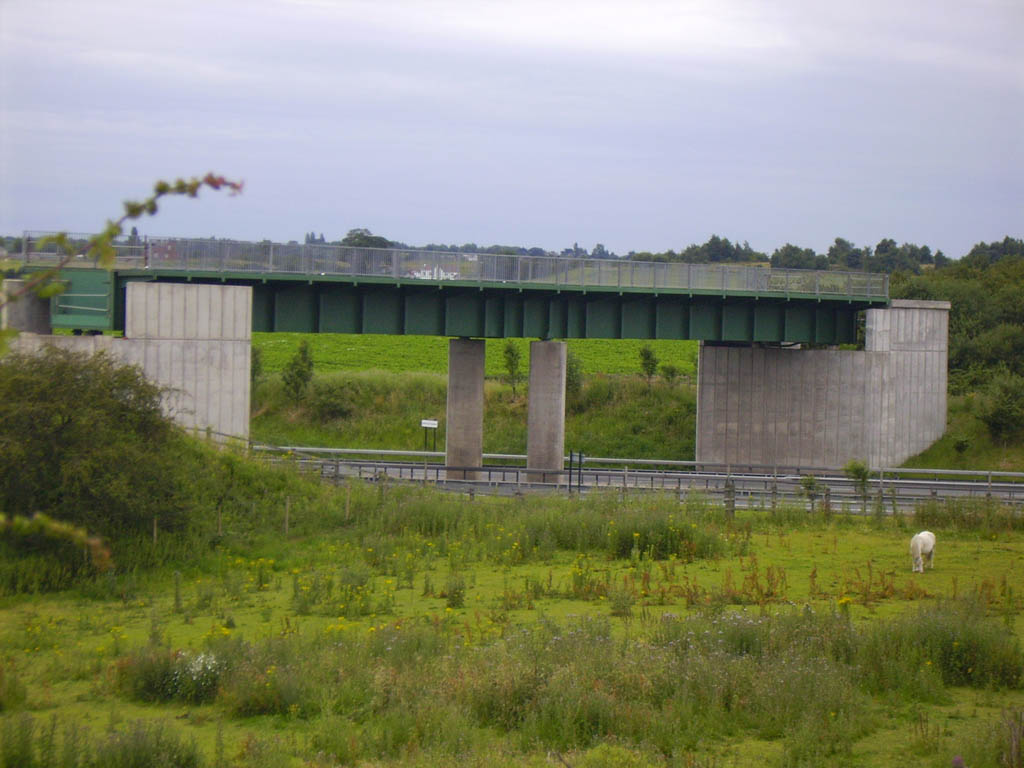
- The Lichfield Canal Aqueduct showing the open end section which will later join to the canal
- Coordinates: 52.6552°N 1.9016°W
- OS grid reference: SK067063
- Carries: Lichfield Canal
- Crosses: M6 Toll Motorway
- Locale: 2km NW of Brownhills

Characteristics
- Trough construction: steel
- Pier construction: concrete
- Total length: c. 46.8 metres (154 ft)
- Towpaths: 2
- No. of spans: 2

History
- Construction end: 2003

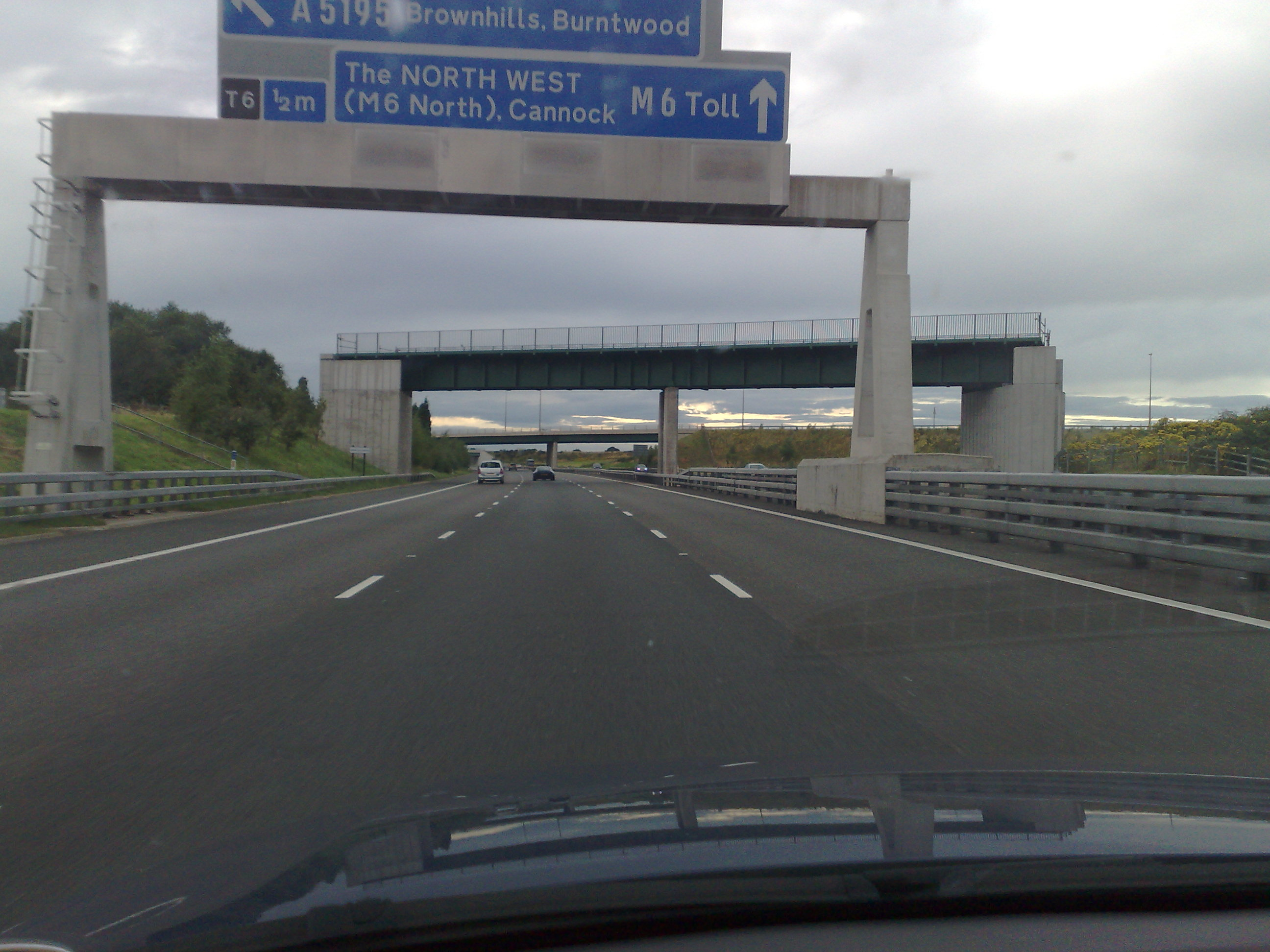
The Lichfield Canal Aqueduct viewed from the Northbound M6 Toll

The Lichfield Canal Aqueduct is a potentially navigable aqueduct over the M6 Toll Motorway, just to the west of Lichfield and north of Birmingham, England. The aqueduct is un-watered; it was constructed at the same time as the motorway in anticipation of the restoration of the Lichfield Canal.

== History ==
The Lichfield Canal (originally part of the Wyrley and Essington Canal) is currently being restored. Restoration was threatened by the construction of the M6 Toll motorway around the north of Birmingham, which cut across the canal's route. The cost of construction was shared, with Midland Expressway (the proprietors of the motorway) funding the foundations and the Lichfield & Hatherton Canals Restoration Trust fundraising to finance the superstructure. The aqueduct was installed on 15 and 16 August 2003.

In 2014/2015, Lichfield and Hatherton Canals Restoration Trust received a Social Investment Business (SIB) grant of £336,000 which enabled the Trust to buy land on either side of the aqueduct and carry out the necessary work to rebuild the canal and bring the aqueduct into use.

In April 2015, Midland Expressway Limited donated £50,000 to Lichfield and Hatherton Canals Restoration Trust to honour an undertaking they made when the M6 Toll Motorway was built. The donation is a "substantial contribution" towards the cost of reinstating the Crane Brook Culvert, which was removed when the motorway was built.

== See also ==
- Canals of the United Kingdom
- List of canal aqueducts in the United Kingdom
