= Litchfield Township =

Litchfield Township may refer to the following places in the United States:

- Litchfield Township, Hillsdale County, Michigan
- Litchfield Township, Meeker County, Minnesota
- Litchfield Township, Medina County, Ohio
- Litchfield Township, Bradford County, Pennsylvania

== See also ==
- Litchfield (disambiguation)
- North Litchfield Township, Montgomery County, Illinois
- South Litchfield Township, Montgomery County, Illinois
