= Litchfield (surname) =

Litchfield is a surname. Notable people with the surname include:

- Bruce Litchfield (1908–1995), Australian architect
- Callum Litchfield (born 1996), vocalist for Bears in Trees
- David Litchfield (born 1975), British security researcher
- Edward H. Litchfield (1914–1968), American educator
- Electus D. Litchfield (1872–1952), American architect
- Elisha Litchfield (1785–1859), Congressman from New York
- Eric Litchfield (1920–1982), British footballer and sports journalist
- Frederick Henry Litchfield (1832–1867), Australian explorer
- Grace Denio Litchfield (1849–1944), American novelist, poet
- Harriett Litchfield (1777–1854), British actress
- Henrietta Litchfield (1843–1927), daughter of Charles Darwin
- Jessie Litchfield (1883–1956), Australian author and pioneer
- John Litchfield (sailor) (1899–1918), American sailor
- John Litchfield (politician) (1903–1993), British politician and Royal Navy officer
- Max Litchfield (born 1995), British swimmer
- Paul Litchfield, British physician
- Paul W. Litchfield (1875–1959), American industrialist
- Peter Litchfield (born 1956), British footballer
- Phoebe Litchfield (born 2003), Australian cricketer
- Richard Buckley Litchfield (1832–1903), British scholar and philanthropist
- Rodney Litchfield (1939–2020), British actor
