= Ogley Junction =

Canal junction in the English Midlands

Coordinates: 52°39′06″N 1°54′59″W

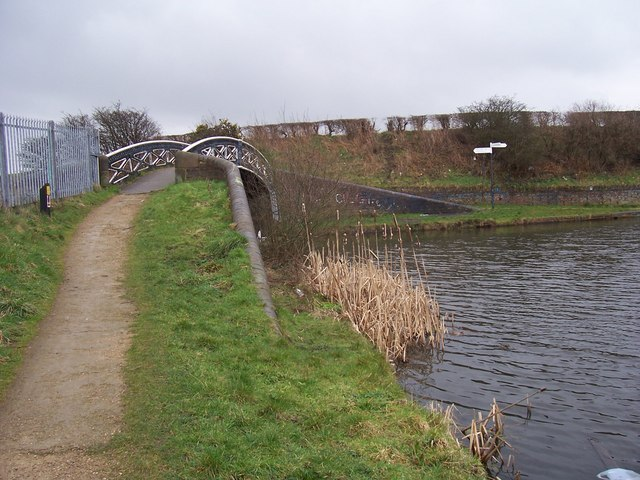
- The towpath bridge over the Lichfield Canal at Ogley Junction

Specifications
- Status: Open
- Navigation authority: Canal and River Trust

History
- Date completed: 1800

Ogley Junction (grid reference SK056060), on the Staffordshire county border near Brownhills, West Midlands, England, is a historic canal junction on the Wyrley and Essington Canal where the Anglesey Branch left the main line (which led to the Coventry Canal at Huddlesford Junction, near Lichfield).

== History ==
The line of the Wyrley and Essington Canal which passes through the site of Ogley Junction was part of a revised plan for the canal. As originally authorised by an Act of Parliament in 1792, it consisted of a main line from collieries at Wyrley and Essington to the Birmingham Canal Navigations at Horseley Fields Junction, near Wolverhampton, with a branch to Birchills, to the north of Walsall. Before construction was completed, a second Act obtained in 1794 authorised a large extension to the east, running from Birchills Junction, where a short stub to the original terminus remained, through Pelsall to Brownhills, where there were coal mines, and then dropping through thirteen locks to Huddlesford Junction. Huddlesford was on the line of the Coventry Canal, although that section had been built by the Birmingham and Fazeley Canal, under a deal which they had negotiated to ensure that there were routes which were likely to guarantee that the new canal was profitable. The old main line, from Sneyd Junction to Wyrley, became a branch. The new main line was opened throughout in 1797.

There were some initial problems, one of which was water supply, and this was aggravated by the failure of the reservoir dam at Sneyd in 1799. However, the situation was resolved when a new reservoir was built at Chasewater in 1800. The reservoir fed water into the canal at the site of Ogley Junction, but the feeder was not navigable, and so was not a junction at the time. It became a junction around 1863, when the Marquess of Anglesey started to sink coal mines near to the reservoir, and the feeder was made wider, so that boats could reach Anglesey Basin to service the mines.

The Wyrley and Essington Canal became disused east of Ogley Junction and was abandoned by Act of Parliament in 1954. Subsequently this stretch has been named the Lichfield Canal and is under restoration. A small stub of the original line exists to the east of the junction, which provides some moorings.

== Location ==
Most of the Wyrley and Essington Canal was level, and connected to the 473 feet (144 m) Wolverhampton Level of the Birmingham Canal Navigations. From the junction, the Anglesey Branch heads to the north west for 1.5 miles (2.4 km), passing under Anglesey Bridge almost immediately, and then crossing a railway track on an aqueduct, to reach Anglesey Basin. To the south, the canal is level for 6.2 miles (10.0 km) to Longwood Junction via the Daw End Branch, where it joins the Rushall Canal, or for 16.2 miles (26.1 km) along the main line to Horseley Fields Junction and the BCN Main Line to Wolverhampton and Birmingham.

The branch to Lichfield and Huddlesford heads east, and the start of the canal is spanned by a grade II listed cast iron bridge. Each side of the elliptical arch is made from two castings, which are bolted together in the centre, and one of them carries the inscription "Horseley Ironworks 1829".

== See also ==
- Canals of the United Kingdom
- History of the British canal system

== Bibliography ==
- Cumberlidge, Jane (2009). Inland Waterways of Great Britain (8th Ed.). Imray Laurie Norie and Wilson. ISBN 978-1-84623-010-3.
- Hadfield, Charles (1985). The Canals of the West Midlands. David and Charles. ISBN 0-7153-8644-1.
- Nicholson (2006). Nicholson Guide Vol 2 - Severn, Avon & Birmingham. Harper Collins. ISBN 978-0-00-721110-4.
- Nicholson (2003). Nicholson Guide Vol 3 - Birmingham & the Heart of England. Harper Collins. ISBN 0-00-713666-8.
- Pearson, Michael (1989). Canal Companion - Birmingham Canal Navigations. J. M. Pearson & Associates. ISBN 0-907864-49-X.
