= Lich (disambiguation) =

A lich, in fantasy fiction, is a type of undead creature.

Lich may also refer to:

== Places ==
- Lich, Hesse, a town in Hesse, Germany
- Long Island College Hospital (LICH), Brooklyn, New York, US
- Lich (pulsar) or PSR B1257+12, a pulsar and star system in the constellation Virgo

== People ==
- Tamara Lich, Canadian political activist

== Fictional characters ==
- Lich (Dungeons & Dragons), the original application of the term for undead sorcerers
- Lich (comics), a Marvel Comics character
- The Lich, a fictional character, the titular character from the eponymous episode "The Lich" of the animated TV show Adventure Time

== See also ==
- List of liches
- Lich King
- Lich Lords
- Demilich (disambiguation)
- Lichfield (disambiguation)
- Litchfield (disambiguation)
- Litch (disambiguation)
