= Litch =

Litch may refer to:

== People ==
- Betty Litch (1941–1994), wife of Richard Butler (white supremacist)
- Debbie Litch, theatre director of the Memphis, Tennessee, USA, theater, Theatre Memphis
- Ernest W. Litch Jr. (1897–1967), a U.S. Navy vice admiral
- John Tilton Litch, Massachusetts state representative during the 1923–1924 Massachusetts legislature
- Josiah Litch (1809–1886), U.S. Methodist preacher of New England

=== Characters ===
- Mr. Litch, a fictional character from Diary of a Wimpy Kid: The Last Straw

== Places ==
- Litch, Georgia, USA; a locality in Greene County

== Other uses ==
- "The Litch", an episode of the TV show Conversations in L.A.

== See also ==
- Lychgate or litchgate
- Litchfield (disambiguation)
- Lichfield (disambiguation)
- Lich (disambiguation)
