= Chasewater Watersports Centre =

Sports venue in Staffordshire, England

Coordinates: 52.663°N 1.952°W

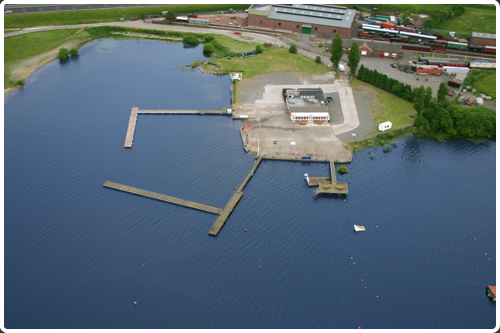
Overhead view of Chasewater Watersports Centre with chasewater railway in the background.

Chasewater Watersports Centre is located within the surroundings of Chasewater Country Park and use Chasewater reservoir for watersports. The chasewater ski club offer activities such as Water skiing, Wakeboarding, Slalom skiing and Kneeboarding all year round.

== See also ==
- Barefoot skiing
- Kneeboarding (towsport)
- Wakeskating
