= Demilich =

Demilich may refer to:

- A type of lich, a creature in fantasy fiction
- Demilich (band), a Finnish death metal band
- Demilich (Dungeons & Dragons), a type of lich found in the Dungeons & Dragons fantasy role-playing game

== See also ==
- Lich (disambiguation)
- Demi (disambiguation)
