= Lichfield House =

Lichfield House may refer to the following houses in London:

- Lichfield House, Richmond, former residence of the Bishop of Lichfield on the site now occupied by Lichfield Court apartments
- Lichfield House, Whitehall, 1680s residence of the Countess of Lichfield, now the back part of 10 Downing Street
- Lichfield House, St James's, 1830s residence of Thomas Anson, 1st Earl of Lichfield; where the Lichfield House Compact was agreed.
