= Litchfield Municipal Airport =

Litchfield Municipal Airport may refer to:

- Litchfield Municipal Airport (Illinois) in Litchfield, Illinois, United States (FAA: 3LF)
- Litchfield Municipal Airport (Minnesota) in Litchfield, Minnesota, United States (FAA: LJF)
