= Litchfield Park =

Litchfield Park can refer to:

- Litchfield Park, Arizona; or
- Litchfield Park, Northern Territory, a locality
  - Litchfield National Park, Australia.
