= Eric Litchfield =

British footballer (1920–1982)

- Born: 21 September 1920; West Derby, Lancashire
- Died: 23 July 1982 (aged 61); Cape Town, South Africa
- Education: Bedford Modern School
- Known for: Footballer; Writer; Sports Editor

Eric Brimley Litchfield (21 September 1920 – 23 July 1982) was a British footballer for Newcastle United and Leeds United, sports editor of The Rand Daily Mail between 1956 and 1970, sports editor of the Cape Times between 1970 and 1982 and an author of books on South African cricket, rugby and association football.

== Early life ==
Litchfield was born in West Derby, Lancashire on 21 September 1920 and educated at Bedford Modern School. He left school at the age of 16 to join Bedford Town F.C. but was also a strong cricketer who had been offered a place at Northamptonshire.

== Football and World War II ==
Litchfield joined Newcastle United in January 1939 but, just as he was starting to establish himself, the war broke out and he was restricted to just two games, one in each of the 1939–40 and 1942–43 seasons. He joined the Royal Air Force but still managed to make guest appearances as a footballer during the war years (for Millwall, Reading, York City and Northampton Town) and was a sports journalist on several service newspapers.

Litchfield made his debut for Leeds United against York in the first game of the 1941–42 Football League Northern Section (First Championship) and in that season he scored his first goal for Leeds against Bradford.

== Journalism ==
After the war, Litchfield emigrated to South Africa where he became a journalist and author, initially in Durban with the Natal Mercury before moving to The Rand Daily Mail in 1949. He became sports editor of The Rand Daily Mail in 1956 and was later sports editor of the Cape Times between 1970 and 1982.

== Authorship ==
Litchfield wrote The Springbok Story From The Inside in 1960, followed by two books devoted to football: Goals In The Sun in 1963 and Book of Soccer in 1965. His writing later turned to cricket with Cricket Grand Slam about South Africa's test series against Australia in 1970 and, with D.J. (Jackie) McGlew, Six for Glory in 1967.

Litchfield was made a Life Member of the National Football League for his contribution to the establishment of professional football in South Africa.

== Personal life ==
Litchfield married Gillian Mai Johnston in 1948 and they had one son. He later married Lynn with whom he had a daughter, Wendy. He was working as the new editor of the Protea Cricket Annual of South Africa when he died in Cape Town on 23 July 1982.

== Selected bibliography ==
- The Springbok Story From The Inside. Published by Timmins; Bailey & Swinfen, 1960
- Goals In The Sun. Published by Simondium-Uitgewers, Johannesburg, 1963
- Book Of Soccer. Published by H. Kearthland, Johannesburg, 1965
- The Story of the Wilfred Isaacs XI. Published in Johannesburg, 1966
- Book Of The Tests. Published by The Rand Daily Mail, Johannesburg, 1967
- Six For Glory. Jackie McGlew and Eric Litchfield. Published by Timmins, Cape Town, 1967
- Cricket Grand-Slam. Published by Bailey Brothers & Swinfen, Folkestone, 1970
- Cape Town City F.C.. Published by Howard Timmins, Cape Town, 1972
- Protea Cricket Annual Of South Africa - 1982. Published by Protea Assurance, Cape Town, 1982
