= Countess of Lichfield =

Countess of Lichfield is a title given to the wife of the Earl of Lichfield. Women who have held the title include:

- Frances Stewart, Duchess of Richmond; secondary title (1647-1702)
- Charlotte Lee, Countess of Lichfield (1664-1718)
- Frances Lee, Countess of Lichfield (died 1769)
- Leonora Anson, Countess of Lichfield (born 1949)
