= Litchfield High School =

Litchfield High School may refer to:

- Litchfield High School (Gadsden, Alabama)
- Litchfield High School (Litchfield, Connecticut)
- Litchfield High School (Illinois)
- Litchfield Senior High School, Litchfield, Minnesota
- Agua Fria High School, Avondale, Arizona, formerly known as Litchfield High School
