= HMS Lichfield =

Three ships of the Royal Navy have borne the name HMS Lichfield, after the town of Lichfield in Staffordshire.

- HMS Lichfield (1658) was a 20-gun fireship, originally the Royalist ship Patrick. She was captured in 1658 by the Parliamentarians and renamed. She was renamed Happy Entrance in 1665. Her fate is unknown.
- HMS Lichfield (1695) was a 48-gun fourth rate launched in 1695, rebuilt in 1730 and broken up in 1744.
- HMS Lichfield (1746) was a 50-gun fourth rate launched in 1746 and wrecked on the north African coast in 1758.

There was also HMS Lichfield Prize, a 36-gun fifth rate captured from the French in 1703 and sold in 1706.
