= Chasewater =

Reservoir in Staffordshire, England

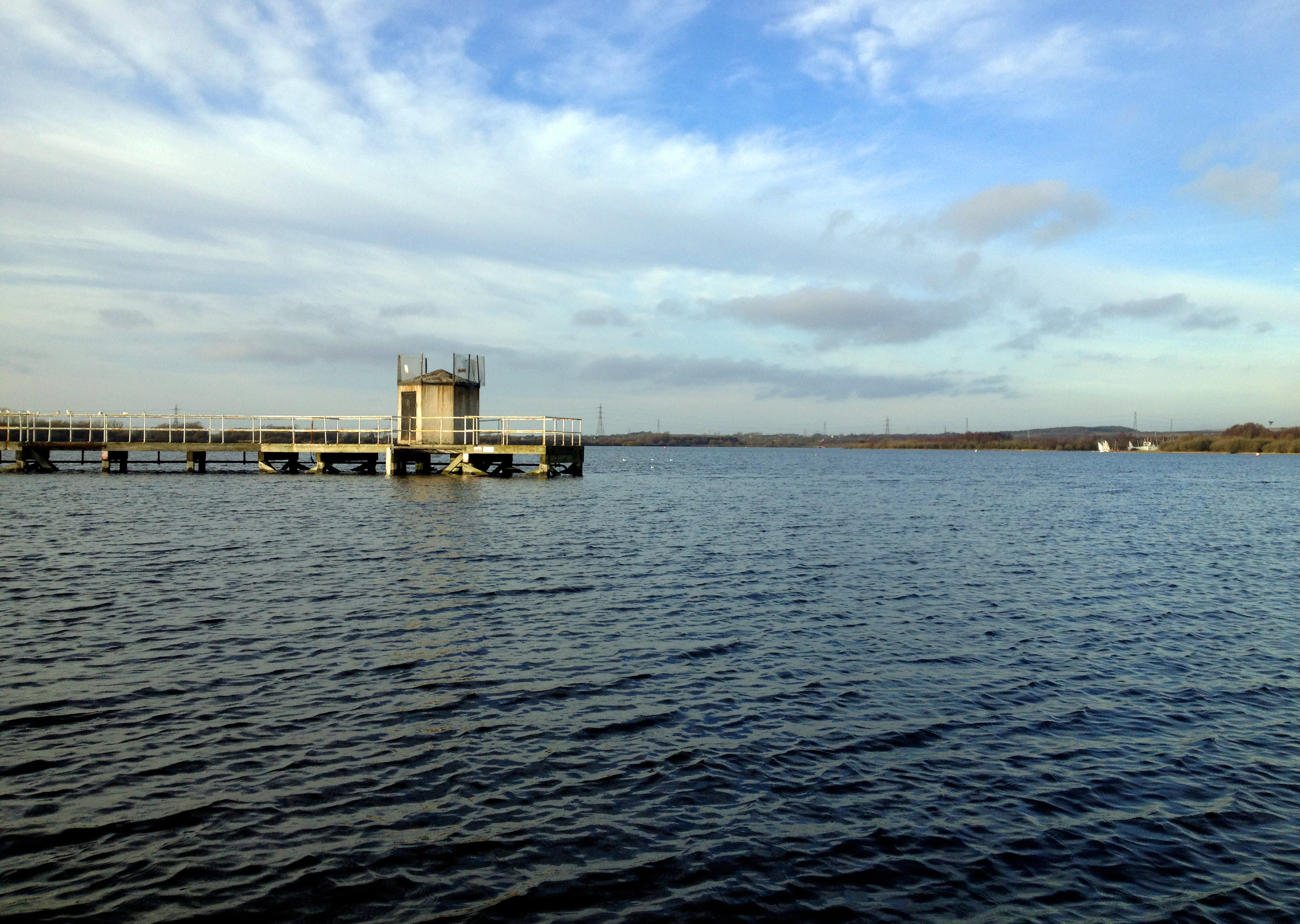
- The reservoir in January 2013

- Location within Staffordshire
- Location: near Burntwood, Staffordshire
- Coordinates: 52.664074°N 1.941686°W
- Type: canal reservoir
- Primary inflows: Big Crane Brook, Little Crane Brook, Norton Brook, Chasetown Brook
- Primary outflows: via culvert to Anglesey Branch of Wyrley and Essington Canal
- Catchment area: 9 square kilometres (2,200 acres)
- Basin countries: England
- Managing agency: Staffordshire County Council
- Built: 1797 (Rebuilt after breach, 1800)
- Max. length: 2.04 kilometres (1.27 miles)
- Max. width: 0.61 kilometres (0.38 miles)
- Surface area: 1.08 square kilometres (270 acres)
- Average depth: 3.4 metres (11 ft)
- Max. depth: 11.3 metres (37 ft)
- Water volume: 4,400,000 m^{3} (4.4 billion litres)
- Shore length^{1}: 5.6 kilometres (3.5 miles) 788 open miles
- Surface elevation: 152 metres (499 ft)
- ^{1} Shore length is not a well-defined measure.

Chasewater is a reservoir located in the parish of Burntwood and the district of Lichfield in Staffordshire, England. Originally known as Norton Pool and Cannock Chase Reservoir, it was created as a canal feeder reservoir in 1797. The reservoir was created to directly supply the Wyrley and Essington Canal and maintain levels in the 160-mile (260 km) Birmingham Canal Network. During a period of great industrial growth in the Black Country region the maintenance of water levels in canal infrastructure was essential and Chasewater was in great demand. As canals became less essential for transport of goods during the mid-20th century, the reservoir diversified and became a popular public amenity with activities such as water-skiing, sailing, wakeboarding and cycling. Chasewater is the third largest reservoir by volume in the county of Staffordshire and the largest canal feeder reservoir in the West Midlands.

== History ==
An act of Parliament, the Wyrley and Essington Canal Act 1794 (34 Geo. 3. c. 25), received royal assent on 28 March 1794, entitled "An Act for extending the Wyrley and Essington Canal", this authorised a long extension, from Sneyd past Lichfield to Huddlesford Junction on the Coventry Canal, together with the raising of up to £115,000 to complete construction. As part of the act the Wyrley and Essington Canal Company were required to provide a water source to keep the new length of canal topped up.

A site in the Crane Brook Valley was selected to be dammed to create a reservoir which would provide water to the new stretch of canal. Excavations started in the valley floor in 1796 and were used to build earthwork dams along the eastern and western edges of the reservoir. A feeder channel to supply water to the canal was cut through from the eastern dam to the top of the locks at Ogley Hay 1.5 miles (2.4 km) to the south east.

The reservoir opened on 8 May 1797, however in June 1799 the eastern dam burst releasing a flood wave downstream along the Crane Brook Valley towards Shenstone, about 4.5 miles to the south east. The cause of the burst was not clear however it was likely that no overflow system was provided and a summer storm caused the dam to overtop and erode the earth embankment. The flood wave caused significant damage with roads and bridges destroyed, fields flooded and livestock killed. The canal company paid out compensation to all who had suffered losses and set about rebuilding the dam. The dam was rebuilt thicker and wider than previously with its inner faces lined with limestone. In the March 1800 the dam had been rebuilt by Thomas Dadford and the reservoir refilled. A watch house was built by the canal company with a full-time watchman to safeguard against any similar incidents in the future.

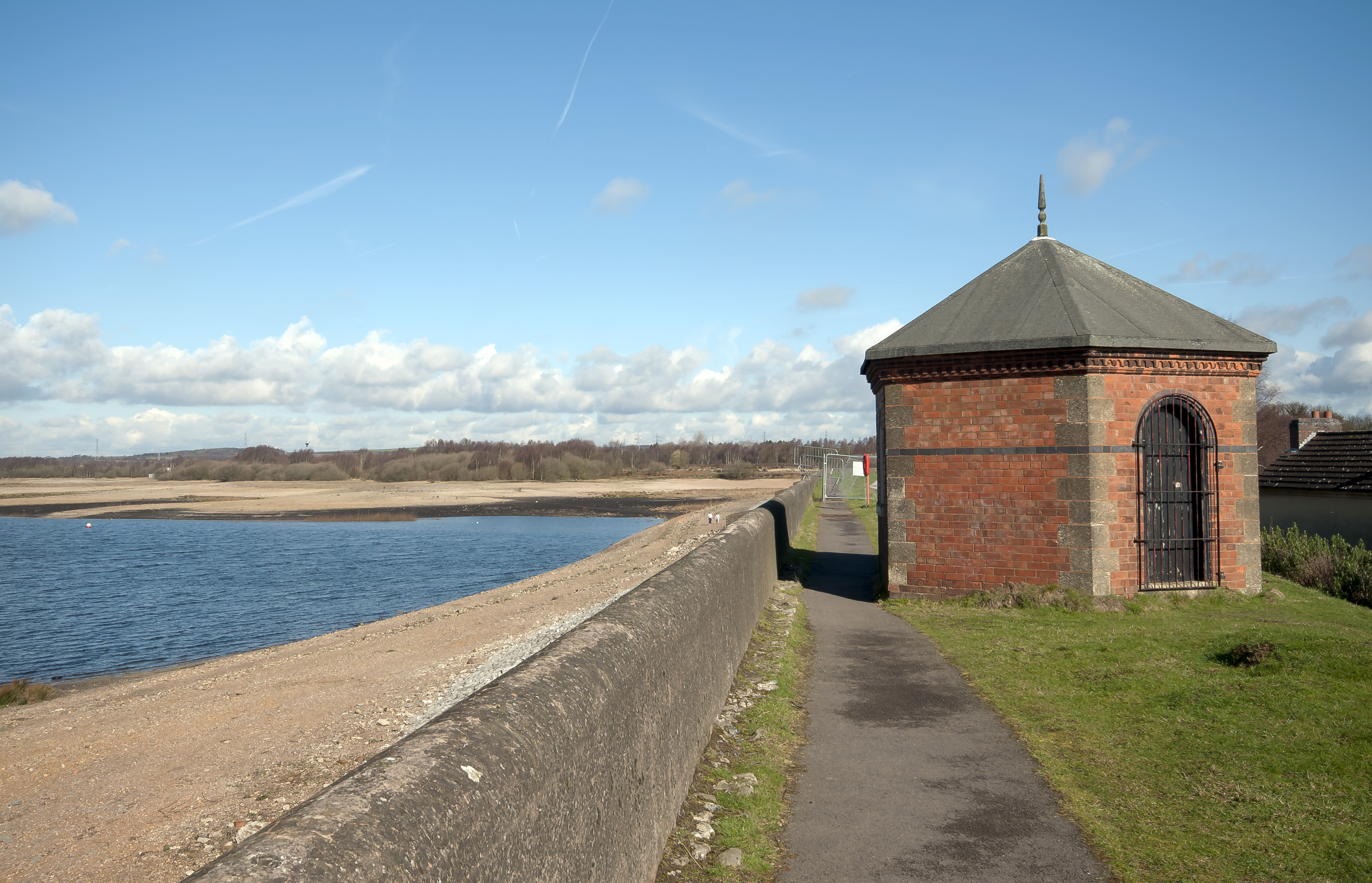
The Valve House on the crest of the dam, built in 1905

In 1840 ownership of the reservoir passed to Birmingham Canal Navigations after the company acquired the Wyrley and Essington Canal Company. During the mid-19th century the coal deposits beneath the reservoir and the surrounding area began to be mined on a large scale due to the Industrial Revolution. The landowner of the area, the Marquess of Anglesey planned to open pits near to the reservoir. The Anglesey Branch of the Wyrley and Essington Canal was constructed between 1848 and 1850 and made the existing feeder channel navigable. In 1849 the marquess opened the Hammerwich Colliery, located adjacent to the Anglesey Branch at the toe of the dam. After barely eight years of operation the colliery last drew coal in January 1857, as it became impossible to work due to the influx of sand and gravel caused by working too close to unconsolidated surface deposits. Many other collieries were opened at this time around the reservoir and continued to be mined into the 20th century.

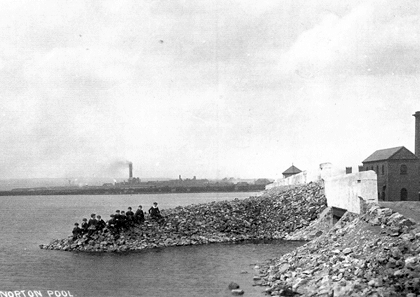
Norton Pool in the early 20th century

After the opening of the South Staffordshire Railway Line in 1849 rail infrastructure serving the collieries around the reservoir began to expand. John Robinson McClean engineered the rail line linking the South Staffordshire Line to the Hammerwich and Uxbridge Collieries as well as the Norton Branch. McClean leased pits from the Marquess of Anglesey and formed the Cannock Chase Colliery Company in 1859. In 1871 the rail line linking the Norton Branch and the Uxbridge Colliery was built. This line, now used by Chasewater Railway, involved the building of a causeway across the Crane Brook valley at the western end of the reservoir. Subsidence in the 1890s led to the extension of the western embankment north to the railway causeway and Norton East Road. In the late 19th and early 20th centuries the eastern dam was raised, with this a new hexagonal valve house and weir was built and the capacity of the reservoir was increased. The increased capacity of the reservoir created Jeffries Swag at the western end of the reservoir.

Under the terms of an act of Parliament authoring abandonment obtained in 1954, most of the branches of the original Wyrley and Essington Canal were closed, including the branch from Ogley to Huddlesford, which was abandoned in 1955. The closing of this section of canal reduced the demand for water from Chasewater. On 21 Oct 1957 the reservoir was purchased by Brownhills Urban District Council from the British Transport Commission for £5,600 and the reservoir was renamed Chasewater.

During the mid-20th century the majority of mines were closed around Chasewater and the area was becoming increasingly used for leisure purposes. In the early 1950s sailing dinghies were the first to arrive, subsequently speedboats joined them a little further up the shore. By the early 1960s the sailing club moved to its present position and a funfair etc. was set up on the south shore, in 1961 the pier and the castle were built along the south shore. The 1960s saw the final rail traffic passing over the causeway and the final coal barge leaving Anglesey Basin. In 1984 a Chasewater Master Plan and Development Strategy was published, which recognised the nature conservation value of Chasewater and the surrounding land. In 1994 Lichfield District Council became responsible for management of Chasewater and the site became a country park in 1998. Continued investment in the nature and leisure value at Chasewater led to the building of the £1.9 million Forest of Mercia Innovation Centre in 2000 and the restoration of the Chasewater Railway as a heritage line. Following an inspection in 2006 it was discovered that remedial works were needed to the eastern dam. As a result of this the reservoir was drawn down 8 metres (26 ft) in spring 2010 for works to be complete by spring 2012. In May 2011 Staffordshire County Council took over ownership of the reservoir to ensure completion of the remedial works.

== Dam and reservoir ==
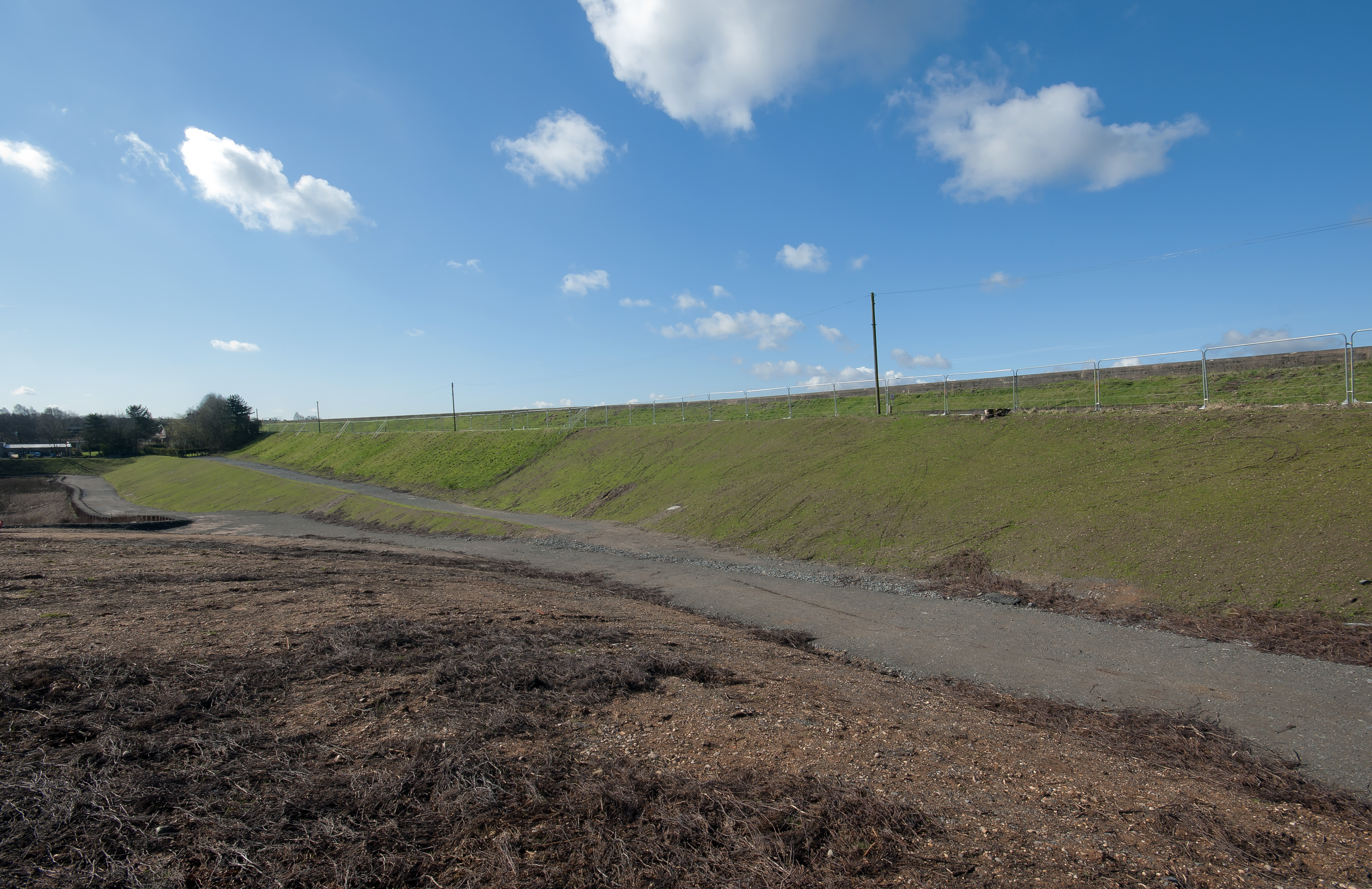
The eastern embankment dam in 2012

Chasewater reservoir is retained by two earth embankment dams. The main eastern dam runs north-south along the eastern side of the reservoir and is 560 metres (1,840 ft) long with a maximum height of 14 metres (46 ft), a crest width of 15 metres (49 ft) and maximum width at its base of 70 metres (230 ft). The secondary western dam is a continuous embankment along the western side of the reservoir and is 1,300 metres (4,300 ft) long with a maximum height of 4 metres (13 ft).

The eastern dam was constructed between 1796 and 1797 across the Crane Brook valley damming Crane Brook; a tributary of the River Tame. The dam was constructed with the boulder clay and alluvium excavated from the reservoir bed. Later additions to the dam are formed with colliery waste from mining activity in the area. The overflow level of the dam was raised in the late 19th and early 20th centuries to increase the capacity of the reservoir. The dam was raised by approximately 1.5 metres (4.9 ft), a new bridge was built across the outflow basin above the old one, a new valve house was constructed on the raised crest and a 3 feet (0.91 m) wave wall was built along the crest.

The western dam stretches from approximately 300 metres (980 ft) north of Brownhills West station to Norton East Road. The embankment dams the headwaters of streams which formerly flowed westwards to discharge into the River Penk. The dam was constructed between 1796 and 1797 with excavated materials from the reservoir bed, however it was extended northwards in the 1890s to counteract the settlement of the land due to mining subsidence. The extended section of the dam was formed with tipped material containing burnt clay and a core of clay puddle. South of the railway causeway the dam was widened when the area was landscaped using colliery waste as fill, it now does not resemble a dam although it still acts as one. The extension of the western dam allowed the overflow to be raised on the eastern dam in the late 19th century. This increased the capacity of the reservoir and created Jeffries Swag on the north side of the railway causeway.

The reservoir has a capacity of 4,400,000m^{3} (4.4 billion litres) and a surface area of 1.08 km^{2} (270 acres) with a maximum water depth of 11.3 metres (37 ft) near its eastern end. Chasewater is the third largest reservoir in Staffordshire by capacity and second by surface area.

== Flora and fauna ==
The Chasewater habitat supports several rare plant and animal species including: floating water-plantain (Luronium natans), round-leaved wintergreen (Pyrola rotundifolia), the carnivorous round-leaved sundew (Drosera rotundifolia), adder's tongue (Ophioglossum), black spleenwort (Asplenium adiantum-nigrum), goldeneye duck (Bucephala) and tufted duck (Aythya fuligula)

== Today ==
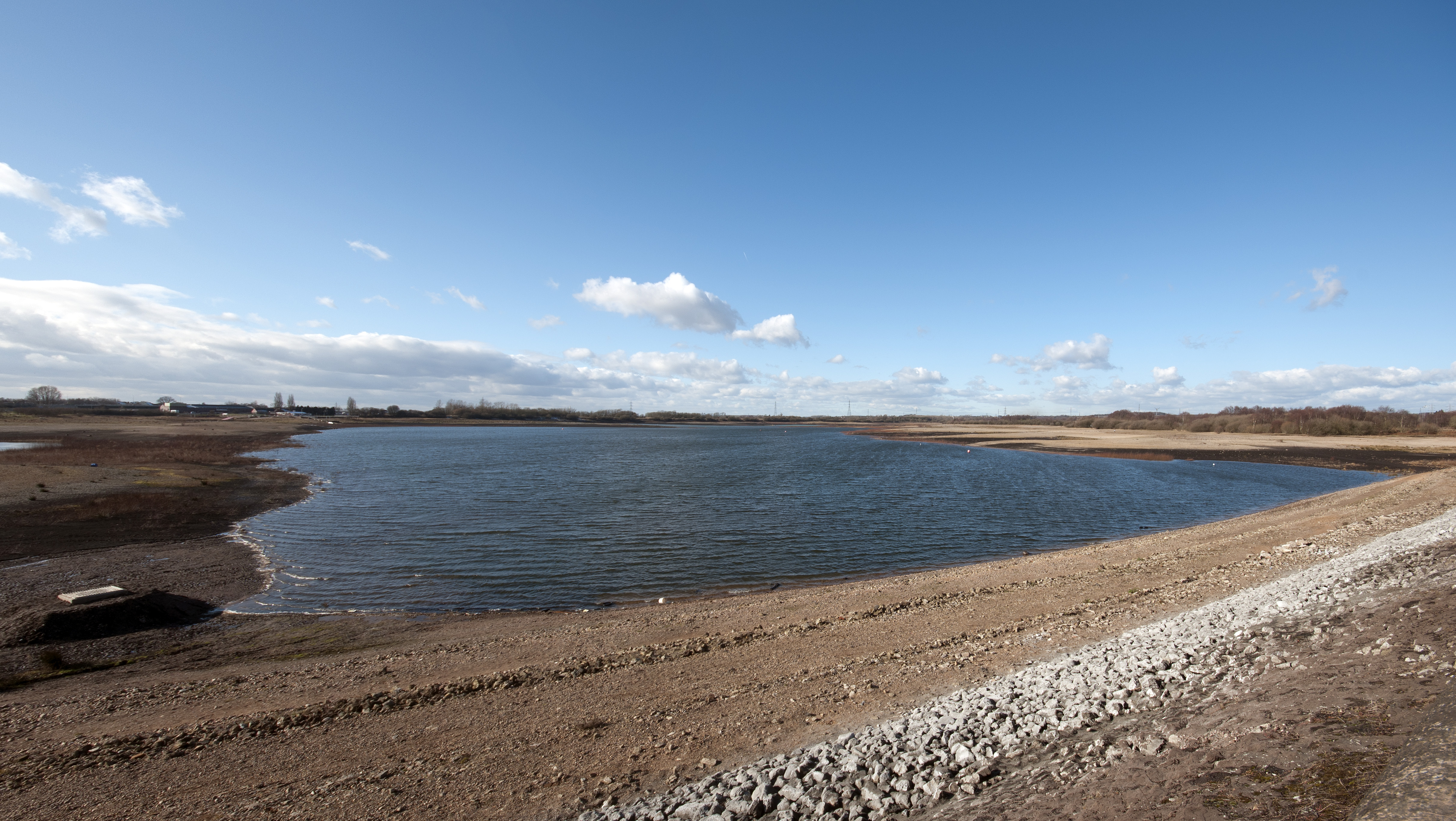
The main body of the reservoir in February 2012

The surrounding area is designated as a country park. The reservoir hosts a variety of activities including water skiing, sailing, angling and bird watching. Running around Chasewater is the Chasewater Railway.

The large house situated halfway along the dam wall was originally the weir master's cottage. The weir master would walk up to the hexagonal valve house, constructed to the same design as BCN tollhouses, and operate the gate valves to release water from Chasewater reservoir into the canal. The construction of the M6 Toll between the reservoir and the A5 required the construction of a new bridge over the motorway to access the southern side of the lake, where an Innovation Centre provides enhanced access to the waterfront. Selling land for motorway construction also allowed the Chasewater Railway to construct new premises and a large engine shed on the lake side.

In June 2019, a Parkrun (a free, weekly timed 5 km run/walk) event started at Chasewater, taking place every Saturday morning at 9am.

== Dam repair ==
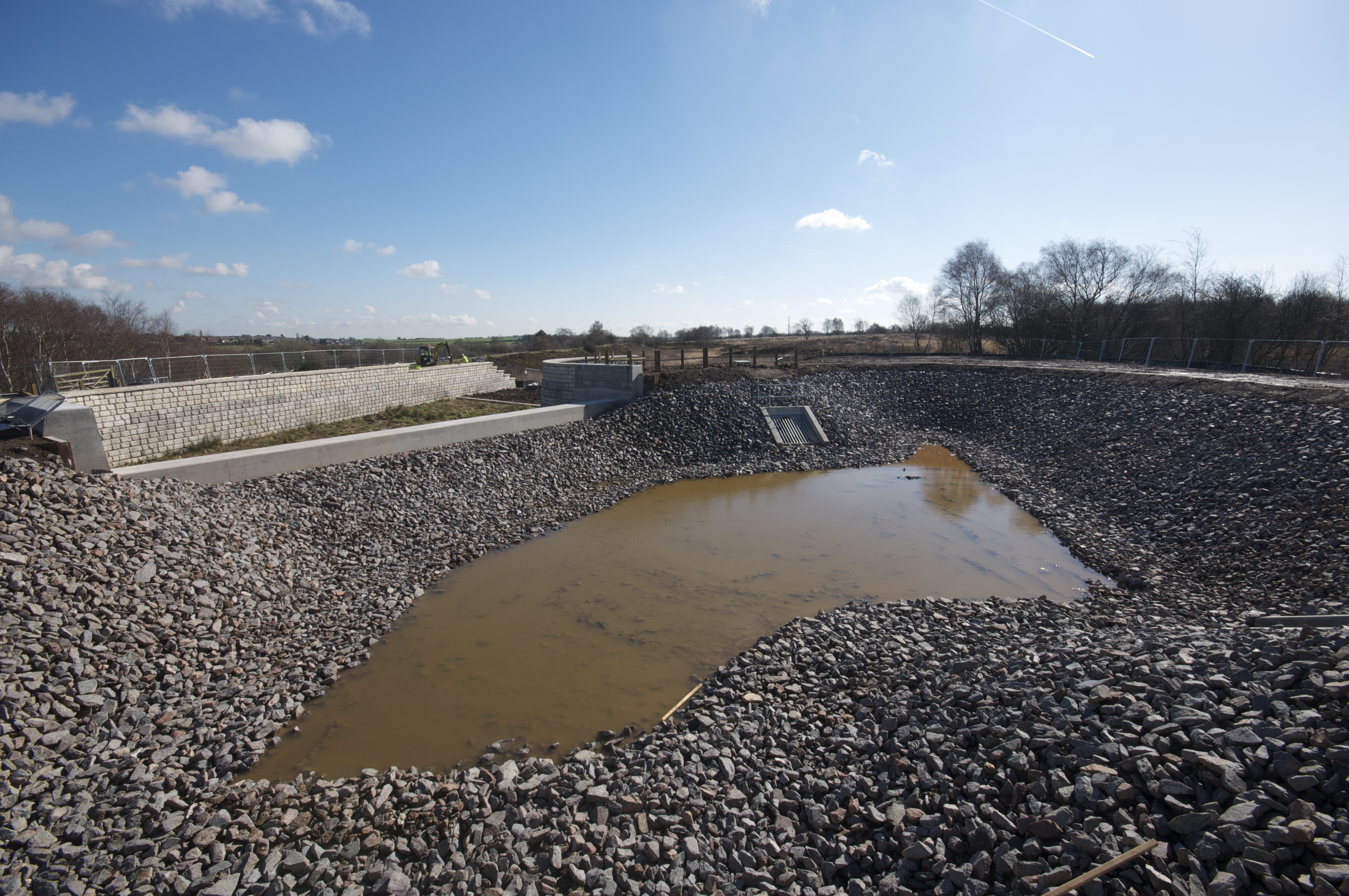
The new overflow arrangement built as part of repair works in 2012

Following an inspection in 2006 and further investigations in the years that followed, it was decided that maintenance works were needed to the eastern dam. The threats to the dam included internal erosion and overtopping of the dam during a storm event. Lichfield District Council appointed Galliford Try as principal contractor for works to start in December 2010. In May 2011 ownership of the reservoir passed to Staffordshire County Council to ensure successful completion of the works. The county council maintained the principal contractor and appointed civil engineers, URS to complete the works.

The water level in the reservoir was lowered by 8 metres (26 ft) from February to April in 2010, in order for the works to be carried out on the eastern dam. To reduce the risk of internal erosion filters were installed at the downstream toe of the embankment to control and monitor seepage through the dam. To meet regulations the reservoir has to be able to withstand a 1 in 10,000-year storm event. To increase the overflow capacity culverts were installed through the causeway carrying Chasewater Railway, this was to increase water flows from Jeffries Swag into the main body of the reservoir. A new bridge, weir and spillway were built at the southeastern end of the reservoir. The drawdown culvert which runs from the reservoir bed to the canal was inspected and restored for the first time in 200 years. The £5.5 million repairs were completed in April 2012.

When the water was lowered, two suspected bombs were discovered on the reservoir bed, these were later determined to be mortar rounds dating from the Second World War.

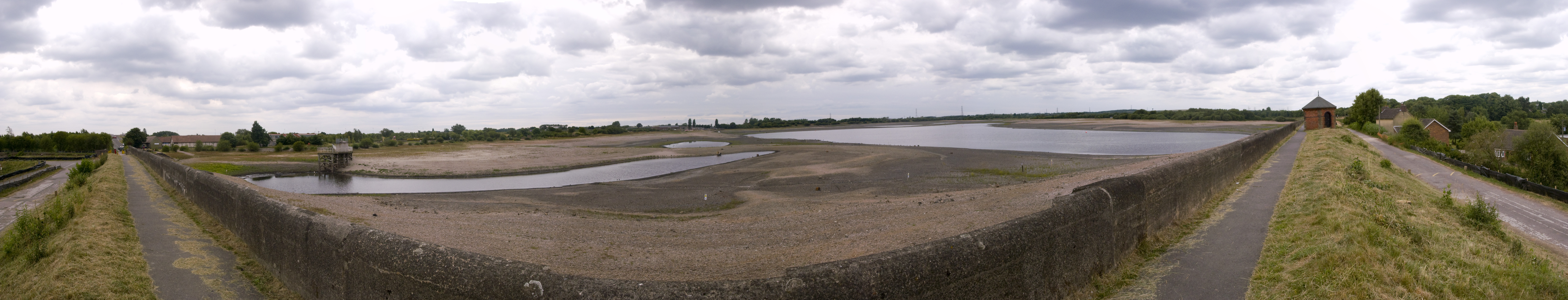
Panorama of Chasewater 8m below overflow level, drained for maintenance in July 2010
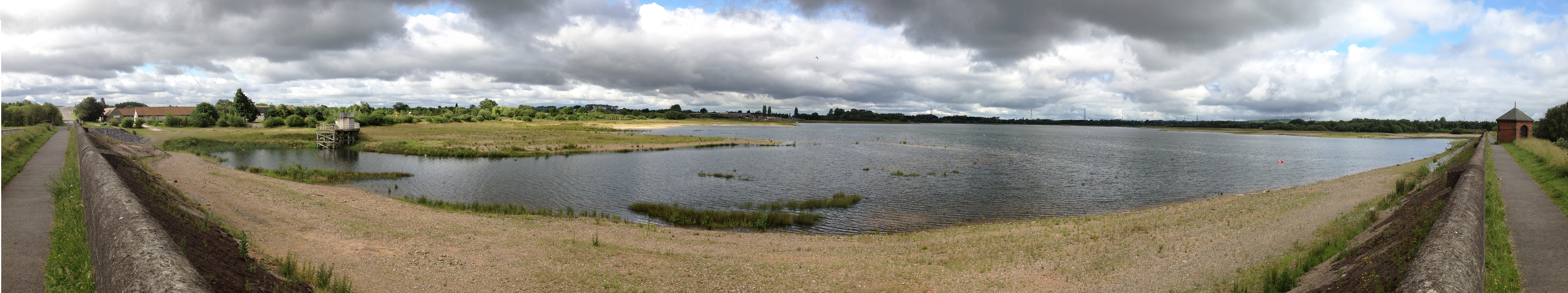
Panorama of Chasewater 4m below overflow level, during refill in July 2012
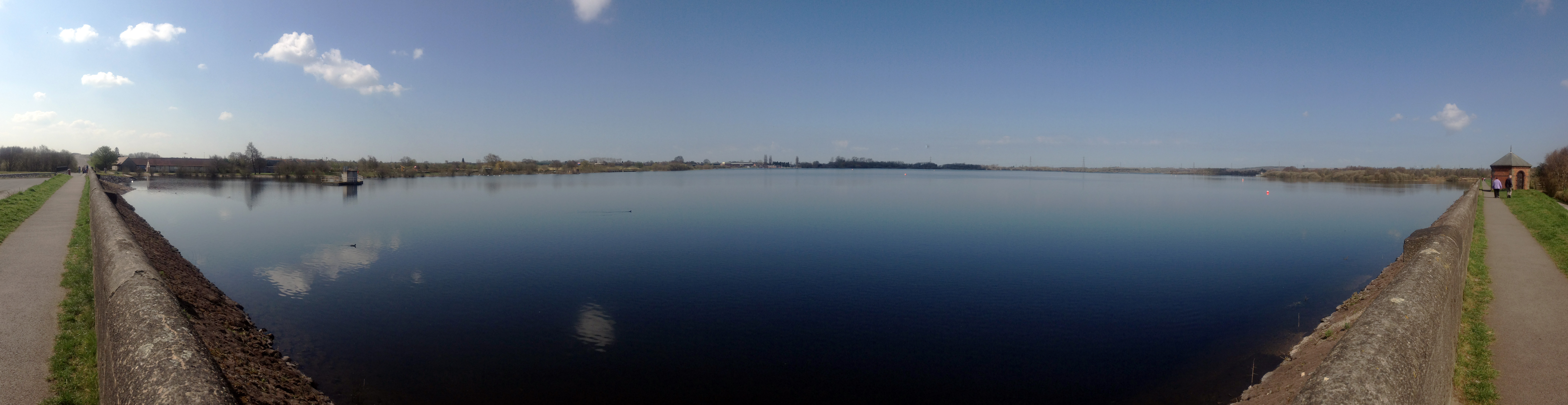
Panorama of Chasewater at top water level in May 2013

== See also ==
- Canals of the United Kingdom
- History of the British canal system
