= Lichfield Canal =

English canal under restoration

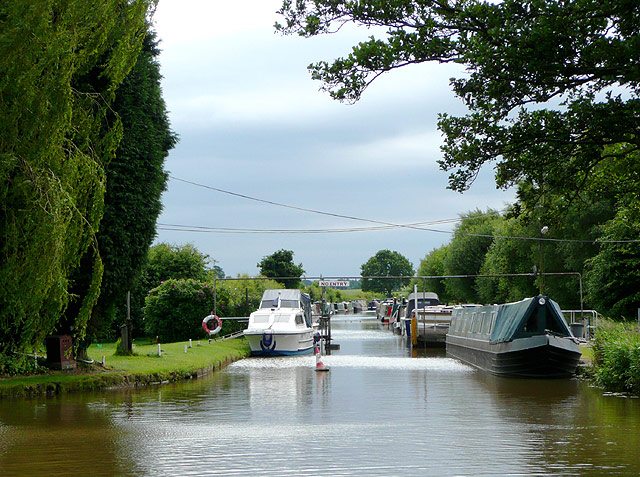
- A short section at the eastern end acts as moorings
- Interactive map of Lichfield Canal

Specifications
- Locks: 30
- Status: active restoration project

History
- Original owner: Wyrley and Essington Canal Company
- Date of act: 1794
- Date completed: 1797
- Date closed: 1955

Geography
- Start point: Huddleford Jn, Coventry Canal
- End point: Ogley Junction, Brownhills

The Lichfield Canal, as it is now known, was historically a part of the Wyrley and Essington Canal, being the section of that canal from Ogley Junction at Brownhills on the northern Birmingham Canal Navigations to Huddlesford Junction, east of Lichfield, on the Coventry Canal, a length of 7 miles (11.3 km). The branch was abandoned in 1955, along with several other branches of the Wyrley and Essington, and much of it was filled in.

Restoration plans were first voiced in 1975, and since 1990, the Lichfield & Hatherton Canals Restoration Trust have been actively engaged in excavating and rebuilding sections of the canal as they have become available. Major projects have included an isolated aqueduct over the M6 Toll motorway, ready for when the canal reaches it.

== History ==
The Wyrley and Essington Canal was built under an act of Parliament, the Birmingham Canal Navigation Act 1792 (32 Geo. 3. c. 81), passed on 30 April 1792, for a canal which would run from Horseley Junction near Wolverhampton to Sneyd Junction, near Bloxwich. The main line would be level, following the 473-foot (144 m) contour. From this junction, a branch would run to Wyrley Bank and on to Essington, which would include nine locks, and another level branch would run to Birchills, near Walsall. In 1794, the company obtained a second act of Parliament, the Wyrley and Essington Canal Act 1794 (34 Geo. 3. c. 25), which authorised a long extension from Birchills to Brownhills, again on the level, but then descending through 30 locks to reach Huddlesford Junction, on the Birmingham and Fazeley Canal near Lichfield. The whole canal was opened on 9 May 1797, although there were problems with inadequate water supply, which were not resolved until 1800, with the building of Cannock Chase reservoir, Chasewater.

Although not prosperous, the Wyrley and Essington Canal Company made enough profit to start paying dividends, which eventually rose to 6 per cent in 1825. The price of coal in Lichfield dropped considerably, due to the benefits of cheap transport. Following an agreement reached on 9 February 1840, the whole canal became part of the Birmingham Canal Navigations from April of that year. Under the terms of the British Transport Commission Act 1954 (2 & 3 Eliz. 2 c. lv) most of the branches of the original Wyrley and Essington Canal were closed, including the branch from Ogley to Huddlesford, which was abandoned in 1955. Much of the bed was subsequently filled in, although a short section at Huddlesford Junction remained in use as moorings. The branch has subsequently been named the Lichfield Canal, while Huddlesford Junction is now considered to be on the Coventry Canal.

== Restoration ==
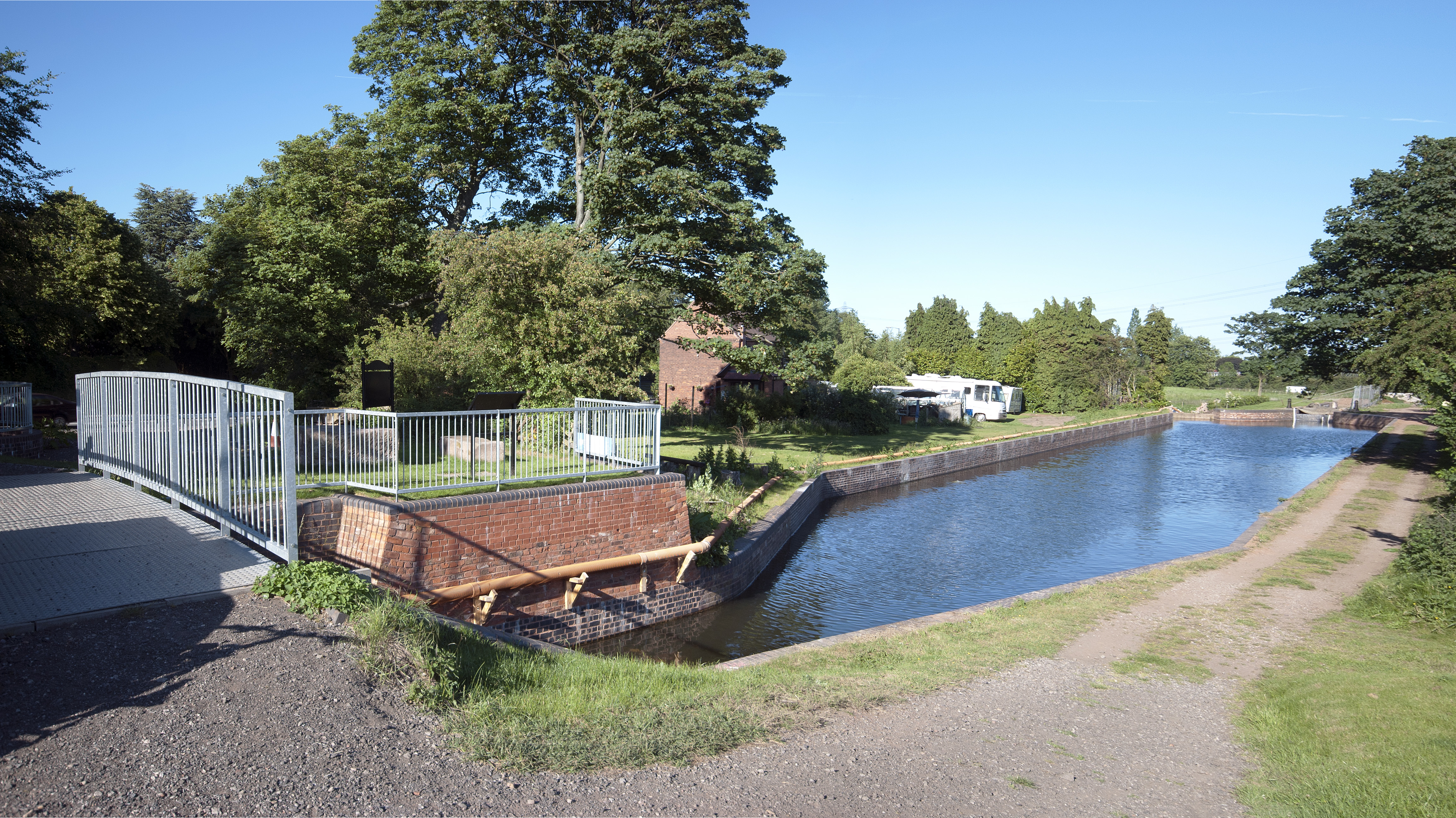
Borrowcop Locks Canal Park on Tamworth Road between Lock 25 and 26.

Plans to restore the Lichfield Canal were first raised in 1975, when area planning authorities were required to produce county structure plans. The Inland Waterways Association (IWA) encouraged all members to ensure that local waterways were properly noted in the structure plans. Ideas for the restoration were put before the West Midlands planning team. Although the scheme was deemed to be unviable, interest in restoration continued, and the Lichfield & Hatherton Canals Restoration Trust (LHCRT) was formed to promote the restoration of the Lichfield Canal and the Hatherton Canal. Lichfield District Council allowed the Trust to start work on a half-mile (0.8 km) section near Fosseway Lane in 1990. In 1993, the Trust published detailed plans for the Ogley Locks Branch, now formally branded the "Lichfield Canal".

All 7 miles (11 km) of the canal are within the jurisdiction of Lichfield District Council. The Trust began working on three main sites, as they became available. The first site was the half mile at Fossway Lane, bounded by locks 18 and 19, which was owned by the council. The second was at Darnford Lane, on either side of lock 29, which was bought by the council in 1995, using a Derelict Land Grant. The third was at Tamworth Road, covering locks 24 to 26. The upper two have been largely restored, while lock 24 was excavated to assess its condition, but was filled in again to conserve it, pending a decision on how the canal would cross Cricket Lane, immediately upstream from the lock. This whole area was landscaped, and designated the Borrowcop Locks Canal Park. In 2023, the lock was re-excavated and turned into a narrows, by removing the gates and lowering the upstream cill. The pound immediatedly above the lock has been lowered, to enable it to pass under Cricket Lane, where a new bridge will be built by Persimmon Homes as part of a housing development. A new lock 24 will then be constructed upstream from the bridge.

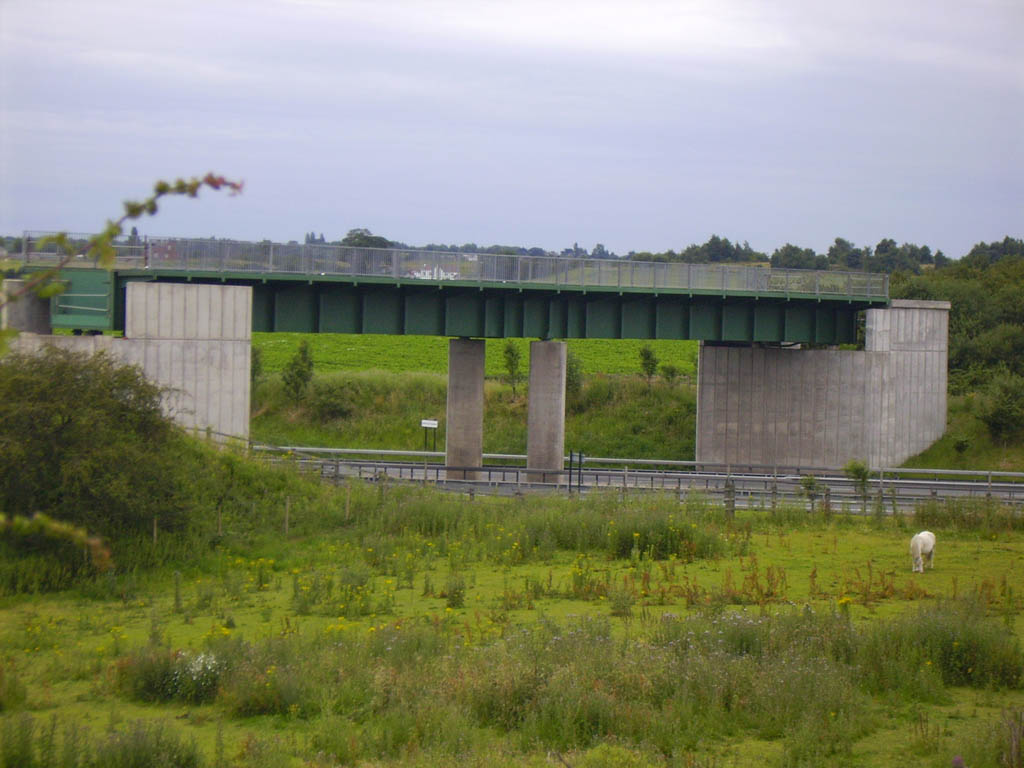
The M6 Toll aqueduct.

Restoration was threatened by the construction of the M6 Toll motorway around the north of Birmingham, which cut across the canal's route. The Inspector heading the enquiry for the Northern Relief Road ruled that the contractor would only be responsible for the footings for a new aqueduct to carry the canal over the motorway, and that the Trust would need to raise the costs for the rest of the structure. An appeal was launched for funds, headed by the actor David Suchet, and together with a grant of £250,000 from the Manifold Trust, the £450,000 cost was met, the road contractors built the supporting columns, and on 16 August 2003, a steel trough was craned into position, having been pre-fabricated by Rowecord Engineering, who are based in South Wales. (The aqueduct has been finished but the canal has yet to reach it, giving it an odd appearance). This had a beneficial side-effect – the Government promised that never again would a new road be built in the path of a waterway restoration scheme, unless an aqueduct or tunnel was provided.

A new bridge taking Cappers Lane over the canal near Whittington was opened by David Suchet on 21 April 2006. Construction costs came from the European Regional Development Fund, but the new bridge will be demolished as part of the High Speed 2 rail link construction. It will be replaced by a new bridge further to the east, and the rail project will construct a diversion for the canal to enable Cappers Lane Viaduct to be built.

By August 2010, most of the work on a by-wash for lock 25, adjacent to the Borrowcop Locks Canal Park, had been carried out by members of the Restoration Trust, with help from the Waterway Recovery Group during weekend visits to Lichfield. The canal between Lock 25 and 26 was filled with water in April 2011, the first part of the canal to be filled with water since restoration works started.

The end of the canal from Huddlesford Junction had been used for moorings by the Lichfield Cruising Club since 1959, and by 2006 included 3,000 feet (910 m) of moorings, a winding hole and a slipway. Recognising that the restoration of the canal would result in some of these moorings becoming unusable, the club purchased an adjacent field in 2006, on which to construct new moorings. Following over 10 years of negotiations, High Speed 2 agreed to construct the new moorings, as they needed some of the field for their own project. Work started in late 2021, and was completed in August 2022.

In September 2025, the LHCRT received a £200,000 Community Infrastructure Levy grant from Lichfield District Council to support Phase 2 of the Gallows Reach section. The funding covers works on a 225-metre canal stretch, including sheet piling, lining, and the creation of a new pedestrian route connecting local housing developments.

Pound 26 Restoration
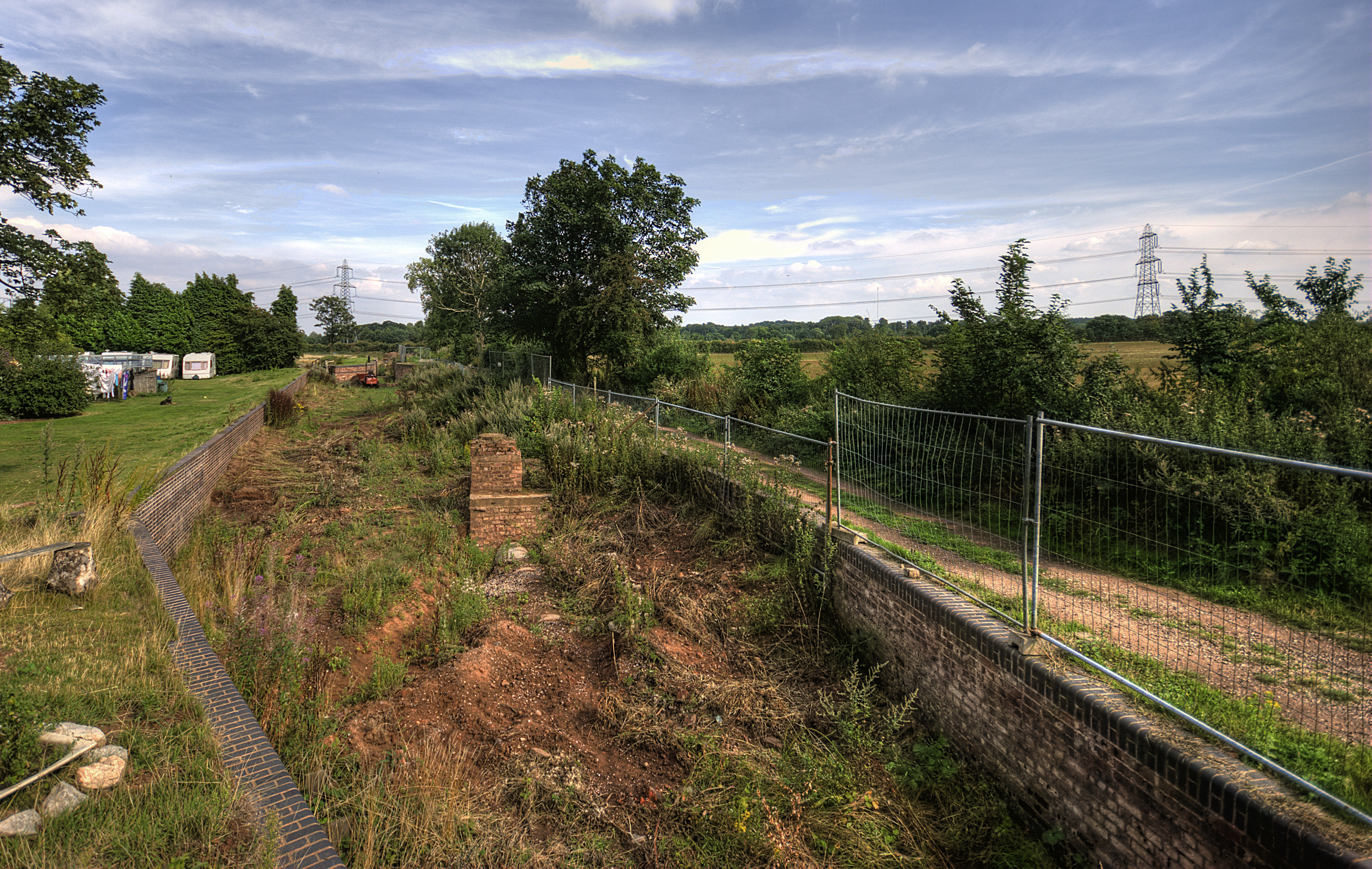
Lock 25 prior to restoration

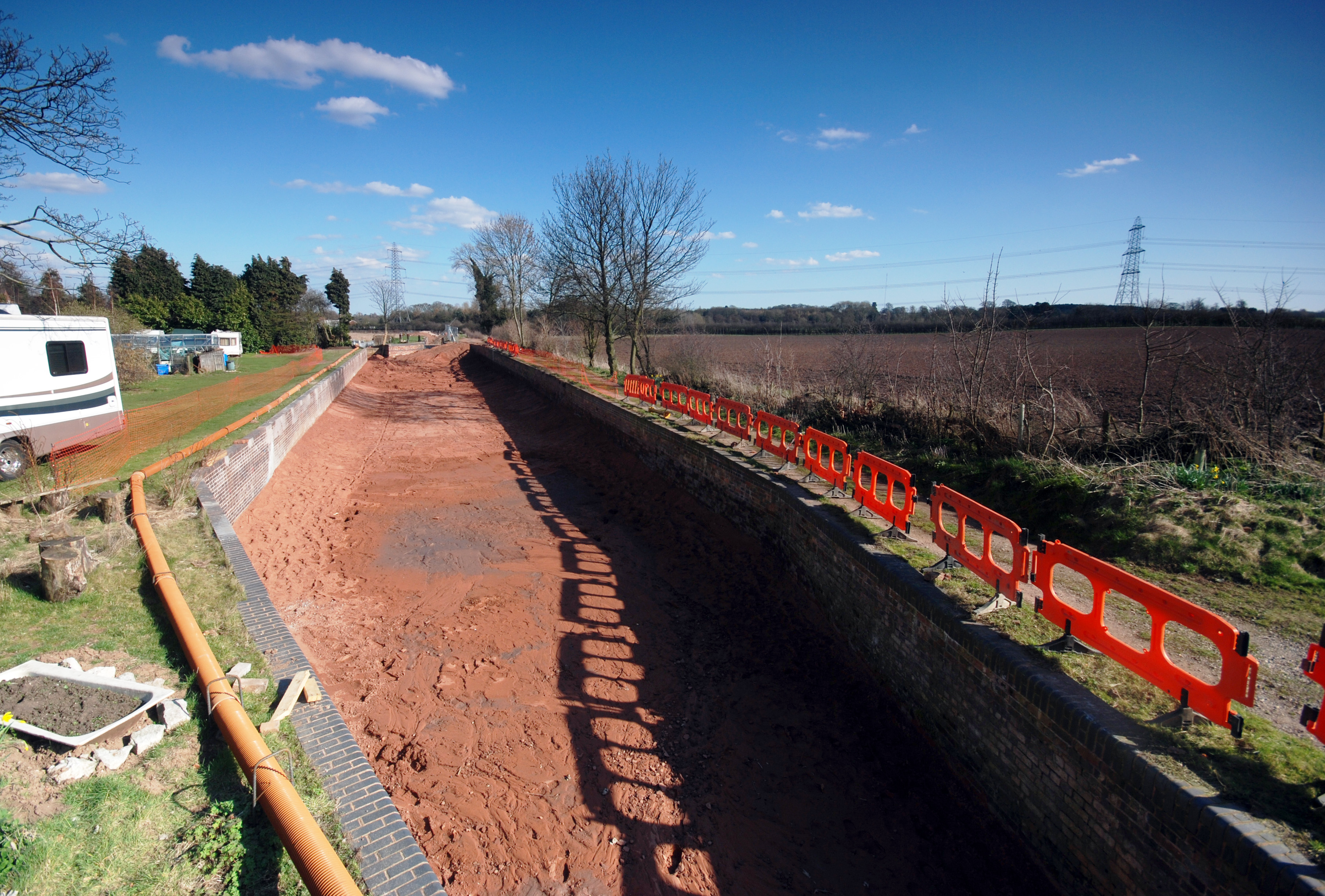
Lock 25 during restoration

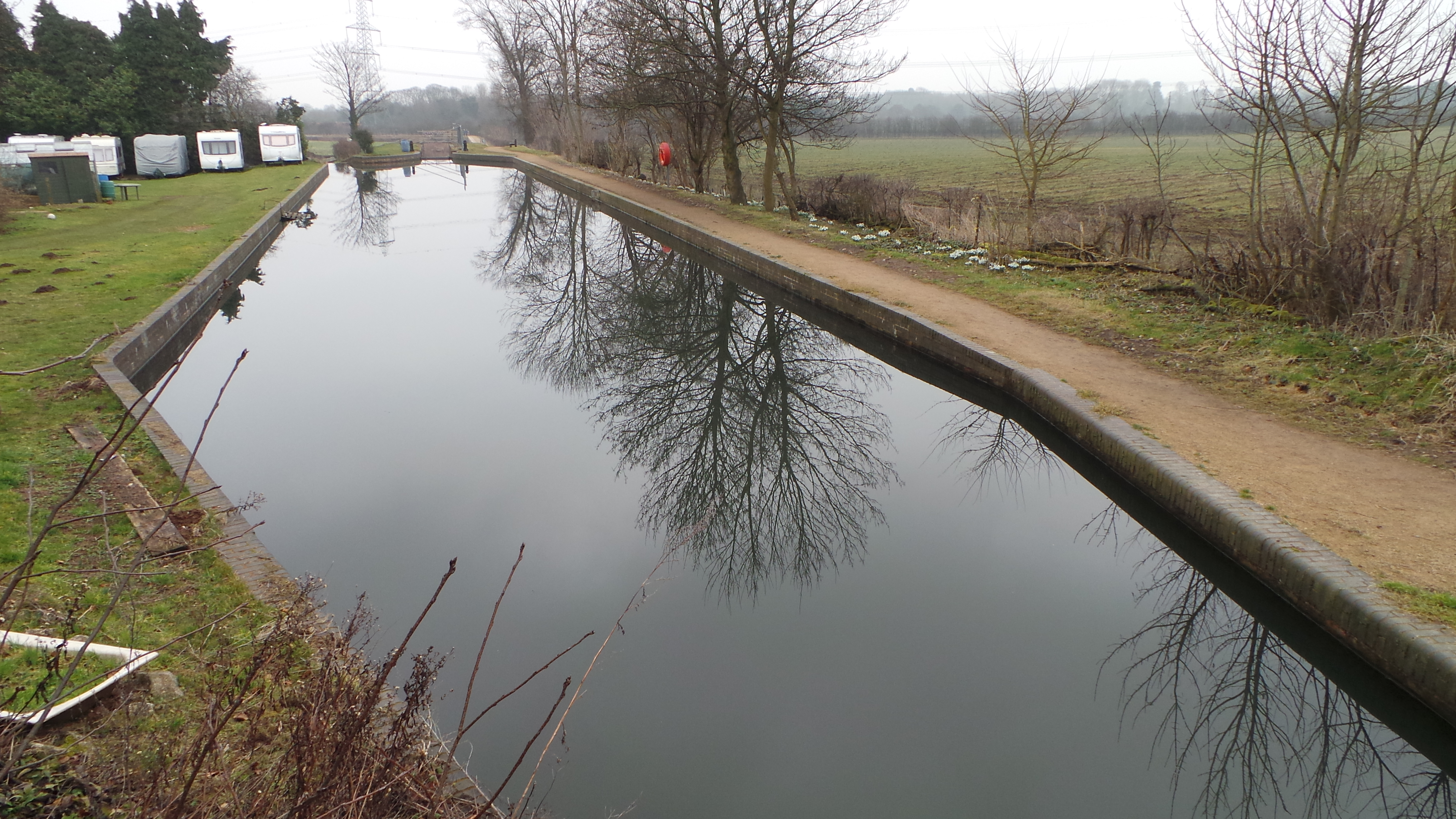
The first part of Lichfield Canal (between Lock 25 and 26) to be re-filled with water (April 2011)
Restoration at Borrowcop Locks Canal Park 2016-2017
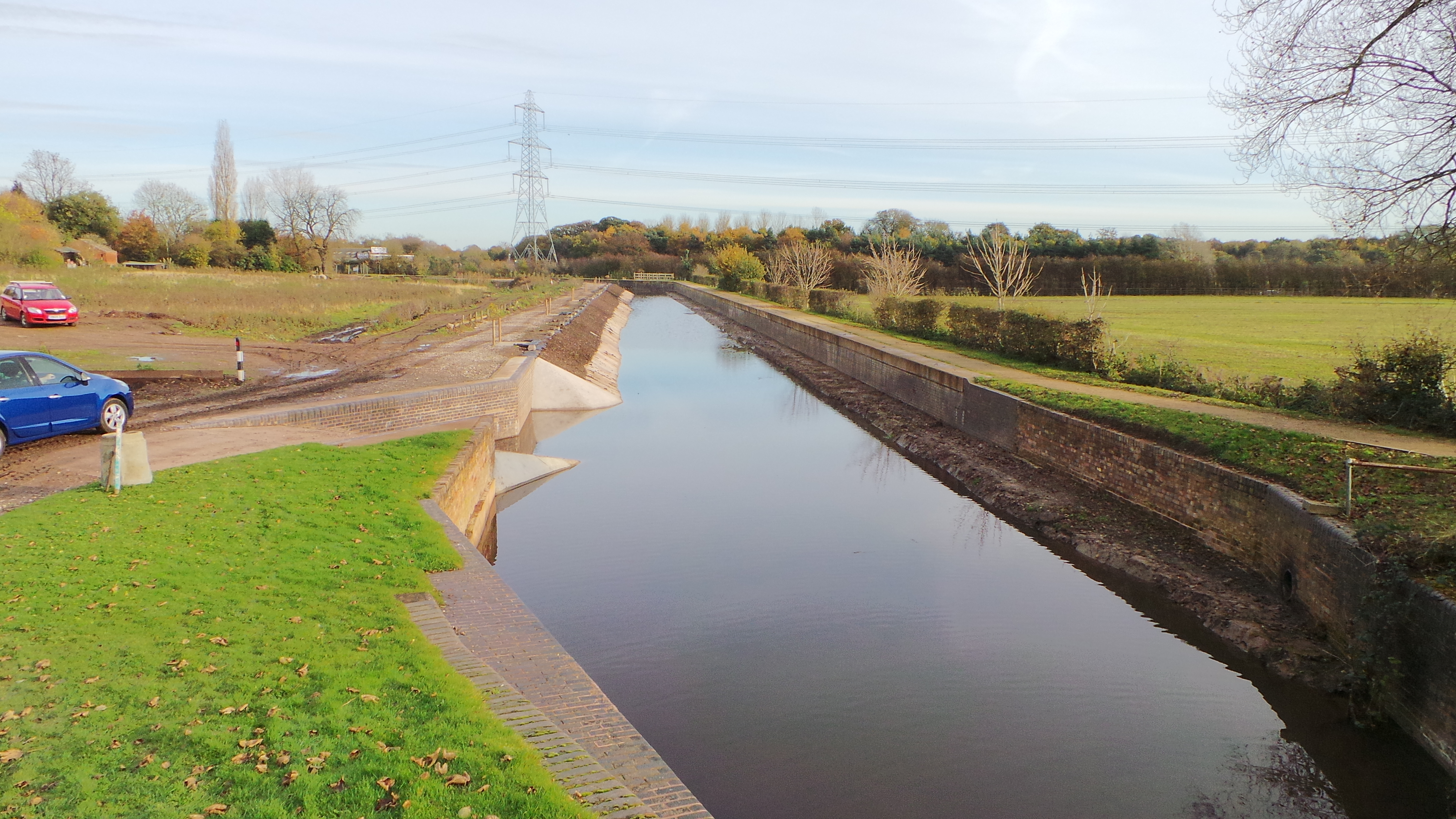
Pound 27 of the Lichfield Canal was completed in November 2016 but will not be fully in water until flood control structures have been agreed with the Environment Agency.

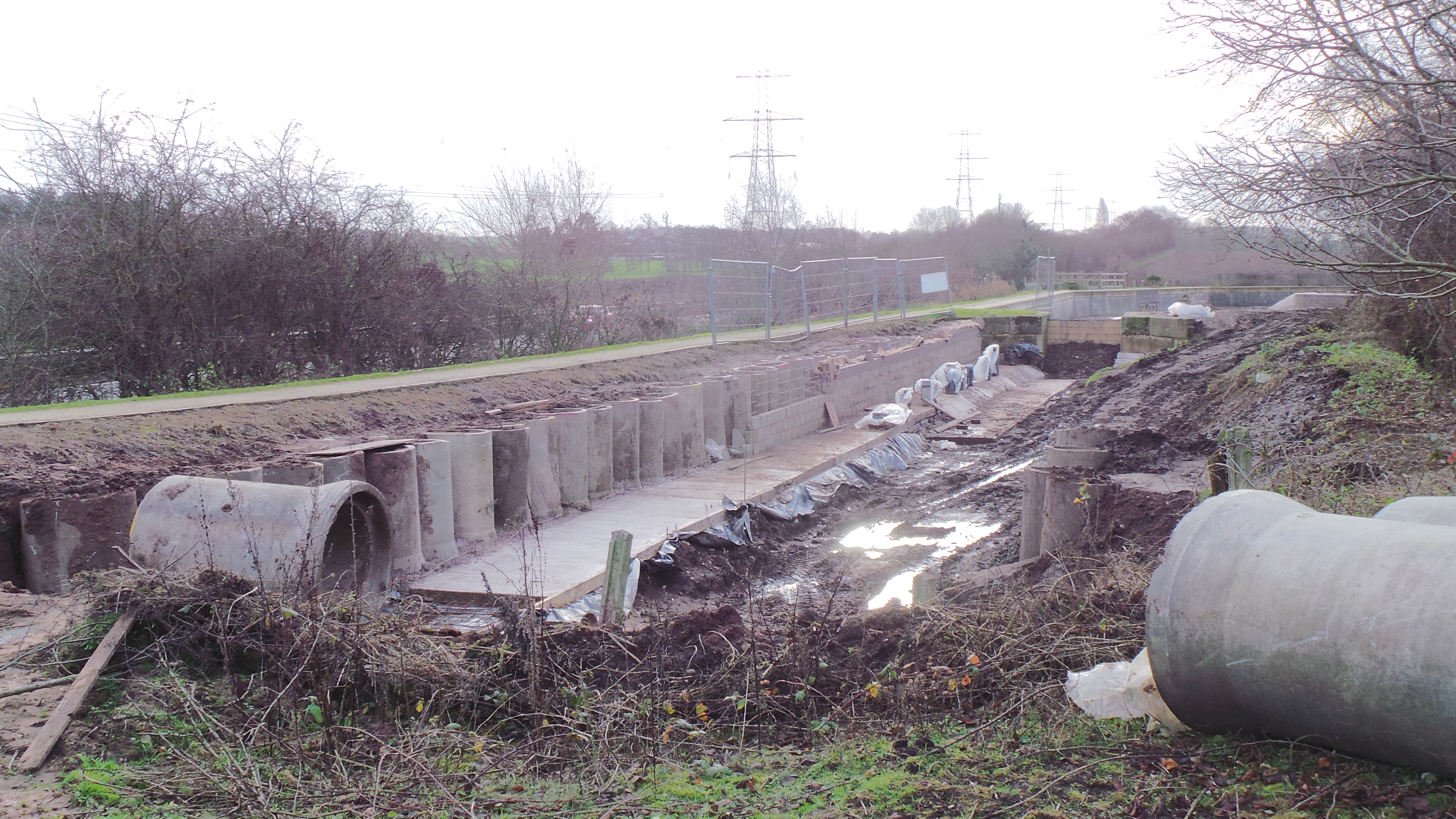
The Lichfield Canal in the process of restoration by Lichfield and Hatherton Canals Restoration Trust. This section runs along the A38, where the A51 crosses the route of the canal.

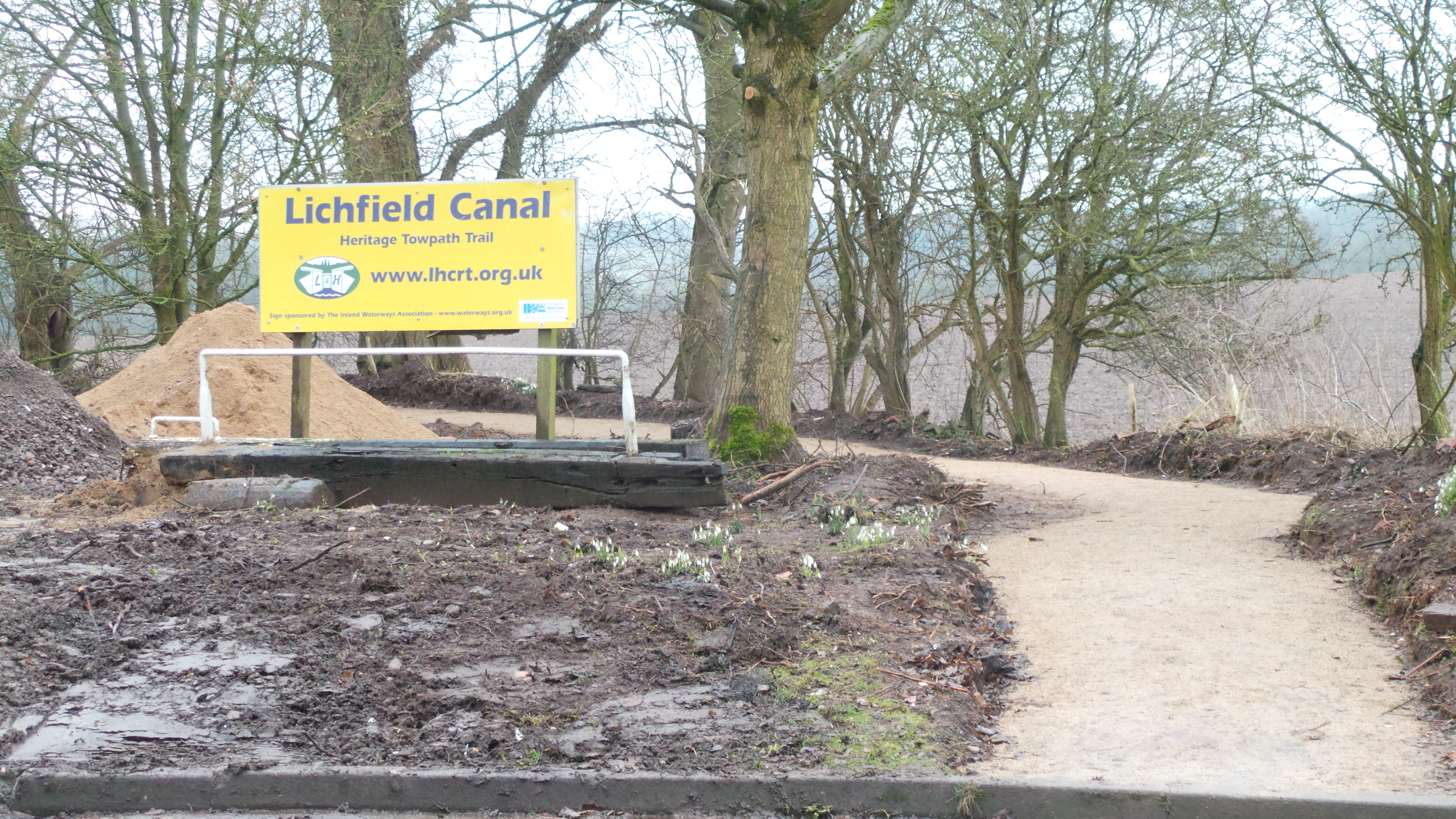
The Heritage Towpath Trail was extended from Borrowcop Locks Canal Park to Cricket Lane in February 2017

== Route ==
| Point | Coordinates (Links to map resources) | OS Grid Ref | Notes |
|---|---|---|---|
| Huddlesford Junction | 52.6833°N 1.7771°W | SK15160953 | Junction with Coventry Canal |
| Watery Lane accommodation bridge | 52.6806°N 1.7815°W | SK14880923 | |
| Cappers Lane | 52.6798°N 1.7829°W | SK14770914 | |
| Darnford Bridge | 52.6753°N 1.7958°W | SK13830870 | |
| A51 Tamworth Road, Freeford Bridge | 52.6723°N 1.8022°W | SK13460830 | |
| A38 road | 52.6725°N 1.8051°W | SK13290833 | Lichfield bypass |
| A5206 London Road | 52.6720°N 1.8226°W | SK12090826 | |
| Bend | 52.6710°N 1.8272°W | SK11770816 | |
| Shortbutts Lane | 52.6719°N 1.8293°W | SK11630826 | |
| Cross-City Line Rail | 52.6747°N 1.8302°W | SK11570856 | |
| Fosseway Lane | 52.6688°N 1.8526°W | SK10060790 | locks below - Ogley 3rd flight |
| Wall Lane | 52.6665°N 1.8589°W | SK09650765 | |
| Shaw's Bridge | 52.6653°N 1.8646°W | SK09260751 | |
| Pipehill A461 Walsall Road | 52.6673°N 1.8689°W | SK08970774 | meets disused railway |
| Coppice Lane | 52.6622°N 1.8770°W | SK08430717 | |
| A461 Walsall Road | 52.6606°N 1.8762°W | SK08480696 | locks below - Ogley 2nd flight |
| A5 road | 52.6562°N 1.8796°W | SK08260649 | Muckley Corner |
| Boat Bridge A461 | 52.6519°N 1.8888°W | SK07630602 | |
| M6 Toll - new Lichfield Canal Aqueduct | 52.6552°N 1.9015°W | SK06760638 | Unfinished aqueduct, part of restoration project |
| Barracks Lane | 52.6529°N 1.9082°W | SK06310613 | locks below - Ogley 1st flight |
| Ogley Junction | 52.6516°N 1.9163°W | SK05770598 | Junction with remaining Wyrley and Essington Canal |

== See also ==
- Canals of Great Britain
- History of the British canal system

== Bibliography ==
- Hadfield, Charles (1985). The Canals of the West Midlands. David and Charles. ISBN 0-7153-8644-1.
- LHCRT (June 2009). Restoration of the Lichfield & Hatherton - Lichfield. Lichfield & Hatherton Canals Restoration Trust.
- Nicholson (2003). Nicholson Guides Vol 3: Birmingham and the Heart of England. Harper Collins. ISBN 0-00-713666-8.
- Priestley, Joseph (1831). "Historical Account of the Navigable Rivers, Canals and Railways of Great Britain". Archived from the original on 12 March 2016.
- Squires, Roger (2008). Britain's restored canals. Landmark Publishing. ISBN 978-1-84306-331-5.
