= Wyrley and Essington Canal =

Narrow canal in the Midlands, England

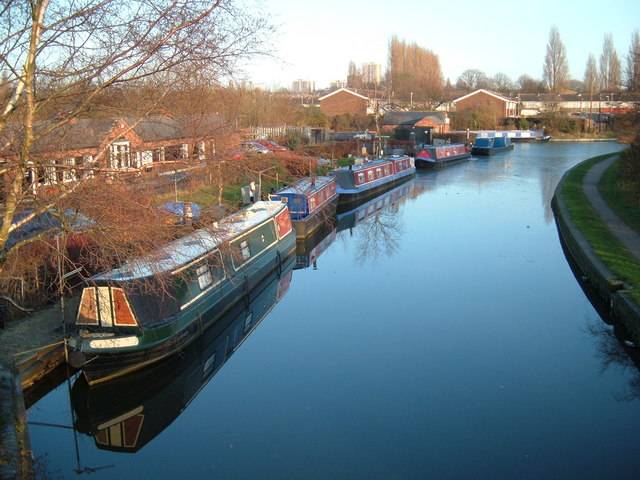
- Sneyd Wharf on the Wyrley and Essington Canal
- Interactive map of Wyrley and Essington Canal

Specifications
- Maximum boat length: 70 ft 0 in (21.34 m)
- Maximum boat beam: 7 ft 0 in (2.13 m)
- Locks: 0 (originally 39)
- Status: Most navigable
- Navigation authority: Canal and River Trust

History
- Original owner: Birmingham Canal Navigations
- Principal engineer: William Pitt
- Date of act: 1792, 1794
- Date completed: 1797
- Date closed: Sneyd Branch 1900s, parts in 1955

Geography
- Start point: Wolverhampton
- End point: Huddlesford Junction near Lichfield
- Branches: Sneyd, Cannock Extension, Daw End, Chasewater

The Wyrley and Essington Canal, known locally as "the Curly Wyrley", is a canal in the English Midlands. As built it ran from Wolverhampton to Huddlesford Junction near Lichfield, with a number of branches: some parts are currently derelict. Pending planned restoration to Huddlesford, the navigable mainline now terminates at Ogley Junction near Brownhills. In 2008 it was designated a Local Nature Reserve.

== Construction ==
Birmingham Canal Navigation Act 1792
- Act of Parliament
- Parliament of Great Britain
- Long title: An Act for making and maintaining a Navigable Canal, from or from near Wyrley Bank, in the County of Stafford, to communicate with the Birmingham and Birmingham and Fazeley Canal, at or near the Town of Wolverhampton, in the said County; and also certain Collateral Cuts therein described, from the said intended Canal.
- Citation: 32 Geo. 3. c. 81
- Territorial extent: Great Britain

Dates
- Royal assent: 30 April 1792
- Commencement: 31 January 1792 (Note: Start of session.)
- Repealed: 14 April 1840
Other legislation
Amended by	Wyrley and Essington Canal Act 1794
Repealed by	Wyrley and Essington Canal Navigation Act 1840

Status: Repealed

Text of statute as originally enacted

The canal was built to allow transport of coal from coal mines near Wyrley, Essington and New Invention to Wolverhampton and Walsall, but also carried limestone and other goods. An act of Parliament, the Birmingham Canal Navigation Act 1792 (32 Geo. 3. c. 81) received royal assent on 30 April 1792, entitled "An Act for making and maintaining a navigable Canal from, or from near, Wyrley Bank, in the county of Stafford, to communicate with the Birmingham and Birmingham and Fazeley Canal, at or near the town of Wolverhampton, in the said county; and also certain collateral Cuts therein described from the said intended Canal". The act authorised the construction of a canal from the Birmingham Canal near Wolverhampton to Wyrley Bank, and the raising of up to £45,000 to pay for construction, £25,000 from the issuing of shares and another £20,000 in loans. The appointed engineer was William Pitt, who might have been the Staffordshire historian, but the minute books of the committee have not survived, so there are no details of how the work progressed, or of Mr Pitt. The Birmingham Canal Company was renamed the Birmingham Canal Navigations (BCN) in 1794.

The canal was level from the Birmingham Canal to Sneyd Junction, a distance of 6.4 miles (10.3 km). The main line then ascended through five locks to reach the collieries at Wyrley Bank, with a further four locks to reach the Essington colliery. A second branch continued on the level from Sneyd Junction to Birchills, near Walsall. There was some animosity with the Birmingham Canal, since the committee passed a resolution to ensure that no person who was a committee member for that canal could become part of the committee. This was rescinded after six months, to reduce tensions. The level section to Sneyd Junction opened in November 1794, but there were issues with the connecting stop lock. The Birmingham Canal had managed to get a clause inserted into the enabling act allowing them to stop boats moving between the two canals if the water level in the Wyrley and Essington was less than 6 inches (15 cm) above the level in the Birmingham Canal. Getting lock gates to seal with such a small drop in level proved difficult, and the gates were locked shut to prevent water passing into the Wyrley and Essington.

Wyrley and Essington Canal Act 1794
- Act of Parliament
- Parliament of Great Britain
- Long title: An Act for extending the Wyrley and Essington canal.
- Citation: 34 Geo. 3. c. 25
- Territorial extent: Great Britain

Dates
- Royal assent: 28 March 1794
- Commencement: 28 March 1794 (Note: The Acts of Parliament (Commencement) Act 1793.)
- Repealed: 14 April 1840
Other legislation
Amends	Birmingham Canal Navigation Act 1792
Repealed by	Wyrley and Essington Canal Navigation Act 1840

Status: Repealed

Text of statute as originally enacted

A second act, the Wyrley and Essington Canal Act 1794 (34 Geo. 3. c. 25) received royal assent on 28 March 1794, entitled "An Act for extending the Wyrley and Essington Canal" – this authorised a long extension, from Sneyd (thus making the line from Sneyd to Wyrley Bank effectively a branch) past Lichfield to Huddlesford Junction on the Coventry Canal, together with the raising of up to £115,000 (equivalent to £16 million in 2025), to complete construction. The 1794 act also authorised a branch to the Hay Head Limeworks, which became known as the Daw End branch, and a short branch to some coal pits, which is variously known as the Lords Hayes, Lord Hayes or Lord Hay's branch. The Lichfield branch would create a new and shorter route for coal traffic from Tipton bound for the Trent and Mersey Canal, and because this would take traffic away from the Birmingham Canal, passage of the bill through Parliament was smoothed out by allowing them to charge a compensation toll of 3 pence (3/240 of a pound) per ton on coal passing through Wolverhampton which was bound for Fazeley via the new route. Water supply was carefully regulated, to protect the supplies used by millers and other canals, and there was a restriction on the amount that could be discharged into Whittington Brook, to protect the Marquess of Donegall's pleasure gardens from damage.

The Lichfield route through to Huddlesford Junction was opened on 8 May 1797, but the company faced financial difficulties, partly caused by shareholders failing to honour the calls on their shares. In April 1798, the company announced that the Hay Head branch could not be finished, because of the lack of funds, but somehow they managed to fund the rest of the work, which was completed by April 1799. They borrowed £1,000 in May 1801, to enable work on the Hay Head branch to resume, but it was still not finished one year later. In July 1800, the accounts showed that there were £3,120 of arrears due to shareholders failing to pay calls. However, they issued their first dividend of £2 per share in November, which resulted in most of the arrears being paid up subsequently. There were also problems with water supply, in part caused by leakage into mines, which resulted in there being insufficient water in some of the pounds. Water was obtained by draining Norton Bog near Chase Water, but the company faced additional difficulties in 1799 when the dam of the Norton Pool Chasewater reservoir failed, causing considerable damage as the water surged through Shenstone, Hopwas and Drayton. Matters were finally resolved when the repairs to the reservoir at Cannock Chase was completed, around 1800.

=== Operation ===
In one sense, the Wyrley and Essington Canal was built ahead of its time, as it ran through rural countryside, and its full potential was only realised with the opening of the Cannock Chase coalfield, towards the end of the nineteenth century. However, it enabled people in Lichfield to obtain cheap coal, and there was a regular service from Lichfield to Derby and Burton upon Trent, while a service from Wolverhampton to London called at Lichfield three times each week. The canal fuelled the development of collieries and limestone quarries near Bloxwich, and an ironworks at Goscote. The brick making industry flourished at Sneyd, using coal that arrived by canal, with the bricks being used for new housing development at Walsall. Other local industries that made use of the canal included bit-making, lock-smithing and tack-making.

The Daw End Branch ran from Catshill Junction to limestone quarries and limeworks at Hay Head. It was around 5.4 miles (8.7 km) long with no locks, and opened in 1800. Prior to its opening, the limestone quarries had been described as "inexhaustible as quantity, and of a very superior quality" in 1795. By 1809, they were disused, and the construction of a railway to serve them had been abandoned. Boats only travelled as far as Daw End wharf at that time, but by 1822 they had reopened, as they were advertised as supplying the ingredients for Brindley's British Cement.

The canal to Essington also suffered from mixed fortunes. The water supply was never really adequate for the number of locks, and in 1798 Henry Vernon, who owned most of the collieries and who had for a time been chairman of the canal company, was paid to pump water from his mines into the canal. He then laid a bill before Parliament for a railway, to run from his collieries to the Staffordshire and Worcestershire Canal at Little Sandon, which would enable him to stop using the Essington Branch. The bill was opposed by both canals, with the Wyrley and Essington arguing that Vernon had become bankrupt in 1789, and that the management of his collieries had since been entrusted to Hordern, who was the canal company's treasurer. The branch had only been built on the promise of the coal traffic from Vernon's mines. Disagreement carried on for years, and the canal company proposed to open proceedings against him in 1812 and 1813, to recover money that he still owed them. Attempts to resolve the issues included an agreement to extend the Wyrley branch for 1.5 miles (2.4 km) towards Wyrley Bank, and to construct a railway to his collieries. The new canal was closed by 1829, but was later reopened and extended. The Essington Branch, which was only 0.75 miles (1.2 km) long, rose to a height of 530 feet (160 m) above ordnance datum. It was the highest point on the Wyrley and Essington, but the branch was the first part of the canal to close, in the 1830s.

Wyrley and Essington Canal Navigation Act 1840
- Act of Parliament
- Parliament of the United Kingdom
- Long title: An Act for consolidating the Wyrley and Essington Canal Navigation with the Birmingham Canal Navigations, and for granting further Powers to the Company of Proprietors of the Birmingham Canal Navigations.
- Citation: 3 & 4 Vict. c. xxiv
- Territorial extent: United Kingdom

Dates
- Royal assent: 14 April 1840
- Commencement: 14 April 1840 (Note: Section 1.)
Other legislation
Amends	Birmingham Canal Navigations Act 1835
Repeals/revokes	Birmingham Canal Navigation Act 1792; Wyrley and Essington Canal Act 1794
Amended by	Birmingham Canal Navigations Act 1844; London and Birmingham Railway and Birmingham Canal Arrangement Act 1846; Birmingham and Dudley Canal Consolidation Act 1846
Relates to	Shrewsbury and Birmingham Railway Act 1846Shrewsbury, Wolverhampton and South Staffordshire Junction Railway Act 1846; Birmingham, Wolverhampton and Dudley Railway Act 1846; Trent Valley, Midlands and Grand Junction Railway Act 1846; Shropshire Union Railways and Canal (Chester and Wolverhampton Line) Act 1846; Stourbridge Railway Extension Act 1861; Birmingham Canal Navigations Act 1926; British Transport Commission Act 1953

Status: Amended

Text of statute as originally enacted

The idea of amalgamation was first raised by the Birmingham Canal Navigations in 1820, but the Wyrley and Essington had rejected the idea. In 1822 they considered whether trade could be improved by building links to neighbouring canals. A number of mine owners suggested a link between the two systems at Walsall in 1825, and surveys for links to the Staffordshire and Worcestershire Canal and to the Birmingham system were made in 1826 and 1827. There was more pressure for a link at Walsall from a group of industrialists in 1829, which resulted in the Wyrley and Essington proposing amalgamation. This time, the Birmingham company were not interested, and in 1835 they dismissed the idea of a junction at Walsall. In 1838, the Walsall contingent suggested the Birmingham company could build the link, and the Wyrley and Essington could supply the water. Still the Birmingham company were not interested, and so the Wyrley and Essington decided to submit a bill to Parliament to build the link themselves. Almost overnight, the Birmingham company's attitude changed, and an agreement to amalgamate was signed on 9 February 1840, which was ratified by an act of Parliament, the Wyrley and Essington Canal Navigation Act 1840 (3 & 4 Vict. c. xxiv) obtained in April.

=== BCN era ===
Once the Wyrley and Essington Canal became part of the Birmingham Canal Navigations, there was a rush of activity to connect the two systems together. The Walsall Junction Canal was the first to be built, consisting of a short section from Birchills Junction and a flight of eight locks descending to the Walsall Canal. It was 0.6 miles (0.97 km) long and opened in 1841. The Bentley Canal was 3.4 miles (5.5 km) long, and descended through ten locks from Wednesfield Junction on the Wyrley and Essington to the Anson Branch, just above its junction with the Walsall Canal. It opened in 1843. The third link was the Rushall Canal, which descended through nine locks from the end of the Daw End branch, to join the Tame Valley Canal at Rushall Junction. This canal had been opened in 1844, and the Rushall Canal, which was 2.9 miles (4.7 km) long, opened in 1847.

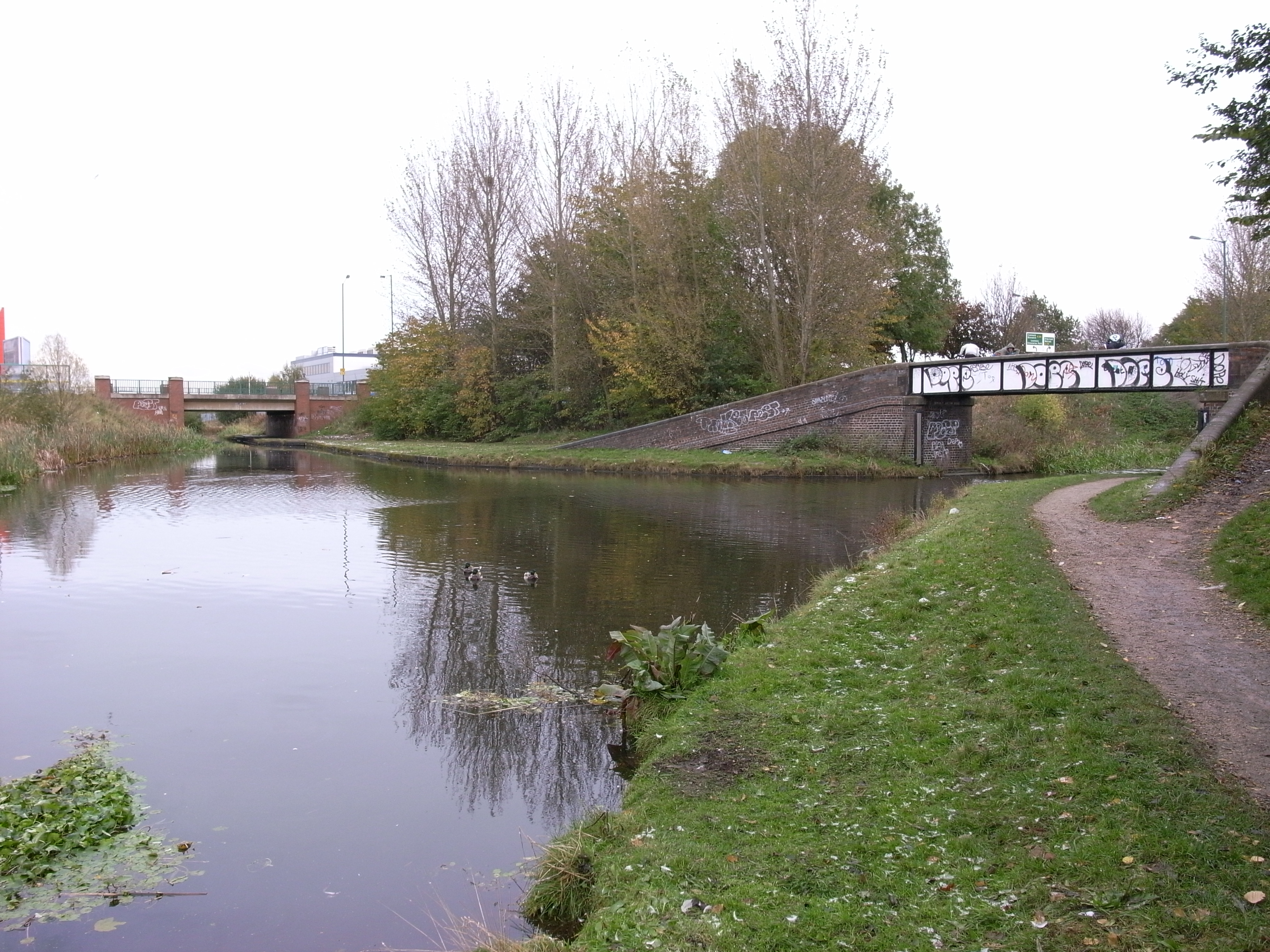
Birchills Junction - The branch to the Walsall Canal runs through the bridge on the right

The extensions of the 1840s had proved to be a success, and in 1854 the BCN, now under the control of the London and North Western Railway (LNWR), obtained an act of Parliament to authorise further works, three of which affected the Wyrley and Essington. The main project was for the construction of the Cannock Extension Canal, a branch between Pelsall and the coal mining area of Hednesford, near Cannock. This included two tramways, one from Norton Springs, and a second from Hednesford Basin to Littleworth. At the time the act was obtained, the Staffordshire and Worcestershire Canal agreed to build a connecting link from their Hatherton Branch to a junction with the proposed Cannock Extension Canal. Purchase of the land for the link was jointly funded by the two companies, but the construction of the flight of 13 locks was paid for by the Staffordshire and Worcestershire Canal. Although the work was completed by 1860, they were not used until the opening of the Cannock branch to Hednesford basin in 1863.

The 1854 act also authorised an extension of the Lord Hay's branch towards Cannock Chase, and another extension of the line along Wyrley Bank, which was completed in 1857. Between them, the Cannock Extension Canal and the Wyrley Bank extension cost over £100,000. Water supply for the Wyrley and Essington came from the Cannock reservoir, and was fed into the canal by a 1.5-mile (2.4 km) feeder. In the early 1860s, the Marquess of Anglesey was opening new coal mines close to the reservoir, and the feeder was widened to make it navigable, to tap into this new market. It became known as the Anglesey Branch.

Heavy coal traffic used the Cannock Extension Canal for its entire life, although subsidence caused by the mining was a regular problem. In an effort to combat the effects of a section of canal sinking, the BCN erected a number of safety gates. Those at Northwood consisted of two sets of mitred gates beneath a bridge, one facing each way, so that if the canal breached, the movement of water would cause one set of gates to close, depending on which side of the bridge the breach occurred.

In common with other canals in the Midlands, it was built as a "narrow" canal, that is, able to take narrowboats approximately 70 by 7 feet (21.3 by 2.1 metres).

The canal was lock-free from the Birmingham Canal mainline at Horseley Fields Junction for 16.5 miles (26.6 kilometres), after which there were 30 locks descending to Huddlesford over a further 7 miles (11 kilometres).

=== Branches ===
A number of branches were constructed:

The section of the original mainline from Sneyd to Wyrley Bank, later considered a branch, was opened in 1798, some 2.2 miles (3.5 km) long with five locks; this was extended towards Great Wyrley in 1799, but the extension was disused by 1829. It was reopened and extended to reach Great Wyrley and serve the mines there in 1857. When completed it was 3.5 miles (5.6 km) long, with major wharfs at Broad Lane, Landywood and Wyrley. This branch was abandoned in 1955, under the powers of the act of abandonment.

The Birchills Branch was opened in 1798, 2.1 miles (3.4 km) long. In 1840 a link to the Walsall Canal was created by a flight of 8 locks at the southern end of the branch.

The Daw End Branch from Catshill Junction to limestone quarries and limeworks at Hay Head was also opened in 1800, some 5.4 miles (8.7 kilometres) long with no locks. Over the years it has suffered from mining subsidence, with the result that many of the embankments are now much taller than when they were constructed. The British Transport Commission Act 1954 (2 & 3 Eliz. 2. c. lv) allowed the final section to the limeworks to be abandoned. Surrounded now by Hay Head Woods, it is still partially watered, and the area has been declared a Site of Important Nature Conservation (SINC).

The Lord Hayes Branch was 0.9 miles (1.4 km) long with no locks; this branch was built under the 1794 act and abandoned under the British Transport Commission Act 1954.

There were three short branches at Gilpins, Slough and Sandhills, all of which are now abandoned.

=== Public ownership ===
In common with most British canals on which there was still reasonable amounts of traffic, the Birmingham Canal Navigations were nationalised on 1 January 1948, under the powers of the Transport Act 1947. All such waterways were initially managed by the Docks and Inland Waterways Executive, which was replaced by a board, answerable to the British Transport Commission in 1953. At that time, the only concern was commercial profitability, with no thought being given to leisure use of the canal network. An act of Parliament, the British Transport Commission Act 1954 (2 & 3 Eliz. 2. c. lv) brought about the closure of the Ogley Locks section of the Wyrley and Essington from Ogley Junction to Huddleford Junction. Several of the branches were also closed at the same time. These were the Sneyd and Wyrley Bank branch, the Lord Hayes branch, and part of the Hay Head branch. The Bentley Canal closed in 1961, removing another link to the network.

The Cannock Extension Canal closed soon afterwards. In July 1960, mining subsidence resulted in the canal bed dropping by 21 ft (6.4 m), and although the banks were rebuilt, commercial traffic stopped in 1961. The canal to the north of the A5 road was abandoned three years later. The Churchbridge connection had been abandoned in 1955, as traffic had ceased on the Hatherton Branch in 1949, again following subsidence. The Churchbridge flight of locks and most of the route north of the A5 have since been destroyed, as a result of opencast mining. Coal traffic on the branch from Anglesey Basin continued for a little longer, but finally ceased in 1967. Since the closure of the Ogley Locks section through Lichfield, the basin is the most northerly point on the Birmingham Canal Navigations to which it is possible to travel by boat.

After closure, much of the Ogley Locks Branch was sold off, and parts were built over, but many of the locks were simply filled in, with the basic structures still intact. Legislation passed in 1975 meant that area planning authorities had to prepare county structure plans. The Inland Waterways Association Midlands Branch and the BCN Society submitted plans to restore the Ogley Locks Branch to the West Midlands planning team, but the scheme was not deemed to be viable at the time. The Lichfield & Hatherton Canals Restoration Trust was formed in 1989, and in 1993 published detailed proposals for the restoration of the branch, which they rebranded as the Lichfield Canal. In 2009 the engineering consultants W S Atkins produced a feasibility study for the restoration, and the Trust have made steady progress in restoring the canal.

Part of the Lord Hayes branch could be restored, as it has been identified as a suitable terminus for the reinstated Hatherton Canal in a feasibility study carried out by W S Atkins. Previously a route to reconnect the Hatherton Canal to Grove Basin on the Cannock Extension Canal had been favoured, but met with opposition from landowners and on environmental grounds, whereas the Lord Hayes route satisfies the environmental concerns, is preferable to landowners, and would reduce the number of new road bridges needed.

== Name ==
The affectionate, rhyming, name "Curly Wyrley" is derived from the fact that the canal is a contour canal, and so it twists and turns in order to avoid any gradients, and thus the need for locks. Some of the bends have been straightened over the years, following mining subsidence.

== Route ==
Point	Coordinates (Links to map resources)	OS Grid Ref	Notes
Huddlesford Junction	52.6833°N 1.7771°W	SK150095	From here to Ogley Junction is also known as the Lichfield Canal (under restoration). Junction with Coventry Canal
Ogley Junction	52.6516°N 1.9163°W	SK056060	continues as Lichfield Canal to Huddlesford Junction - dry
A5 road (Watling Street)	52.6562°N 1.9261°W	SK049065	Freeth Bridge, on Anglesey Branch
Anglesey Branch aqueduct	52.6555°N 1.9235°W	SK051064	over dismantled railway
Anglesey Branch terminus	52.6639°N 1.9404°W	SK040073	with feeder from adjacent Chasewater Reservoir
Chasewater Reservoir	52.666°N 1.949°W	SK034076	
Sandhills Branch	52.6426°N 1.9216°W	SK034076	
Catshill Junction	52.6411°N 1.9279°W	SK048048	Daw End Branch
Longwood Junction	52.5904°N 1.9424°W	SP039992	Daw End Branch joins Rushall Canal
Slough Arm	52.6452°N 1.9535°W	SK031053	
Gilpins Arm	52.6365°N 1.9625°W	SK025043	
Pelsall Junction	52.6376°N 1.9727°W	SK018044	Cannock Extension Canal
Lords Hayes Branch	52.6361°N 1.9887°W	SK007043	dry
Lords Hayes terminus	52.6353°N 2.0125°W	SJ991042	dry - estimated from map
Chase Line aqueduct	52.6024°N 1.9881°W	SK008005	
Birchills Junction	52.5987°N 1.9979°W	SK002000	Walsall Canal
Sneyd Junction	52.6149°N 2.0232°W	SJ984019	dry
Essington Junction	52.6253°N 2.0295°W	SJ980030	Essington Locks branch, dry - estimated
Junction at Norton Colliery	52.6376°N 2.0218°W	SJ985044	dry - estimated from map
Wyrley terminus	52.655°N 2.0386°W	SJ973064	dry - estimated from map
Essington terminus	52.6303°N 2.0440°W	SJ970036	dry - estimated from map
M6 bridge	52.6069°N 2.0208°W	SJ985010	Under M6 motorway
Short Heath branch	52.6025°N 2.0419°W	SJ971005	Towards New Invention
Wednesfield Junction	52.5970°N 2.0925°W	SO937999	Bentley Canal
Horseley Fields Junction	52.5852°N 2.1132°W	SO923986	BCN Main Line

== See also ==
- Canals of the United Kingdom
- History of the British canal system

== Bibliography ==
- Atkins (July 2009). "Lichfield Canal - Feasibility Study Report". W S Atkins. Archived from the original on 11 April 2019.
- Broadbridge, S R (1974). The Birmingham Canal Navigations Vol 1 1768-1846. David and Charles. ISBN 978-0-7153-6381-2.
- Cumberlidge, Jane (2009). Inland Waterways of Great Britain (8th Ed.). Imray Laurie Norie and Wilson. ISBN 978-1-84623-010-3.
- De Salis, Henry Rodolph (1904). "Bradshaw's Guide". Archived from the original on 18 February 2012.
- Dean, Richard (1989). Historical Map of the Birmingham Canals (Map). M & M Baldwin. ISBN 978-0-947712-08-2.
- Hadfield, Charles (1985). The Canals of the West Midlands. David and Charles. ISBN 978-0-7153-8644-6.
- Paget-Tomlinson, Edward (2006). Canal and River Navigations. Landmark Publishing. ISBN 978-1-84306-207-3.
- Priestley, Joseph (1831). "Historical Account of the Navigable Rivers, Canals, and Railways of Great Britain". Archived from the original on 6 March 2016.
- Squires, Roger (2008). Britain's restored canals. Landmark Publishing. ISBN 978-1-84306-331-5.
- Ware, Michael E. (1989). Britain's Lost Waterways. Moorland Publishing. ISBN 978-0-86190-327-6.
