= Huddlesford Junction =

Canal junction in Staffordshire, England

Coordinates: 52°41′00″N 1°46′38″W

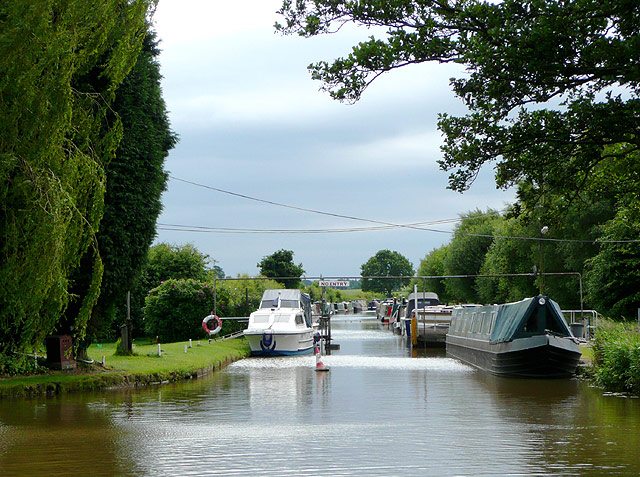
- The Lichfield Canal from Huddlesford Junction

Specifications
- Status: moorings
- Navigation authority: British Waterways

History
- Date completed: 1797
- Date closed: 1954

Huddlesford Junction (grid reference SK150095) is a canal junction at the original north-eastern limit of the Wyrley and Essington Canal where it met the Coventry Canal, near Lichfield, in Staffordshire, England.

== History ==
The Coventry Canal was authorised by an act of Parliament, the Coventry Canal Act 1768 (8 Geo. 3. c. 36), and the intention was to build a canal from Coventry, passing through Bedworth, Atherstone, Fazeley and Whittington, to join with the Grand Trunk Canal at Fradley Junction. The Grand Trunk Canal was later renamed the Trent and Mersey Canal. Good progress was made at first, and the initial 10 miles (16 km) from Coventry to Bedworth, where there were coal mines, opened in 1769. A lucrative trade in coal developed, and two years later, the canal reached Atherstone, but here a flight of eleven locks were needed and there was insufficient capital to proceed any further.

The Birmingham and Fazeley Canal was authorised 13 years later, in 1784, which would join the Coventry Canal at Fazeley Junction. Prior to obtaining their act of Parliament, they negotiated with several other canals, in order to ensure that significant trade would be generated once it was opened. The Oxford Canal agreed to complete their line, to link up with the River Thames at Oxford, and the remaining length of the Coventry Canal would be built in three sections. The Coventry Canal would extend their existing line from Atherstone to Fazeley, which included the flight of locks at Atherstone and two more at Galscote. The Birmingham and Fazeley Canal would build the next section from Fazeley to Whittington Brook, and the final section from Whittington Brook to Fradley would be built by the Trent and Mersey Canal. In an unusual example of cooperation, the network was completed in 1790.

The final part of the jigsaw which resulted in the junction being created was the Wyrley and Essington Canal, which was authorised in 1792 as a canal from coal mines in Wyrley and Essington to Wolverhampton, with a branch to Birchills, near Walsall. With construction only just started, they applied for a second Act of Parliament, which resulted in the main line to Wyrley becoming a branch, and the branch to Birchills being extended to collieries at Brownhills, and then descended through 30 locks, passing Lichfield to reach Huddlesford Junction. Huddlesford Junction was on the section of the Coventry Canal built by the Trent and Mersey, although the Coventry company eventually bought that section back. The Wyrley and Essington Canal, including the junction, opened on 8 May 1797, but traffic was a little intermittent at first, as the locked section was often short of water. This was compounded by the failure of the reservoir at Sneyd in the summer of 1799, but resolved once the reservoir at Cannock Chase was completed in 1800.

The Wyrley and Essington Canal became disused to the east of Ogley Junction and was abandoned in 1954. Restoration works have been underway since 1990, spearheaded by the Lichfield and Hatherton Canals Restoration Trust who have been actively engaged in excavating and rebuilding sections of the canal. The canal is now called the Lichfield Canal and the Trust aims to have the restoration completed by 2026. Currently only a small section from Huddlesford Junction to Cappers Lane Bridge is in use as moorings.

== Location ==
The junction is located 4 miles (6.4 km) south from Fradley Junction, where the Coventry Canal joins the Trent and Mersey. There are no locks on this section, but there are Trent and Mersey locks close to both sides of Fradley Junction. To the south of the junction, it is 1.5 miles (2.4 km) to Whittington Brook, the point at which the canal is still officially part of the Birmingham and Fazeley Canal, as the 5.5 miles (8.9 km) to Fazeley Junction was never sold to the Coventry Canal. Continuing along the Coventry Canal, the first of the Glascote locks is 1.4 miles (2.3 km) from Fazeley Junction, and a total of 8.4 miles (13.5 km) from Huddlesford Junction. The first lock on the Birmingham and Fazeley Canal is 3 miles (4.8 km) to the south of Fazeley Junction.

Adjacent to Huddlesford Junction is The Plough, a red-brick country pub and restaurant, and Lichfield Cruising Club, a boat owners club which uses the first 0.25 miles (0.40 km) of the Lichfield Canal as moorings. Boat owners began informally mooring their boats there in 1959, when the watered section suffered from silting and was choked with weed. The Lichfield Cruising Club was set up in its present form in 1978, and members have since enhanced the area by removal of silt and weed, by creating a clubhouse from two cottages formerly used by lengthsmen employed by British Waterways, and by the addition of a winding hole and slipway close to Capers Lane Bridge.

== Panorama ==
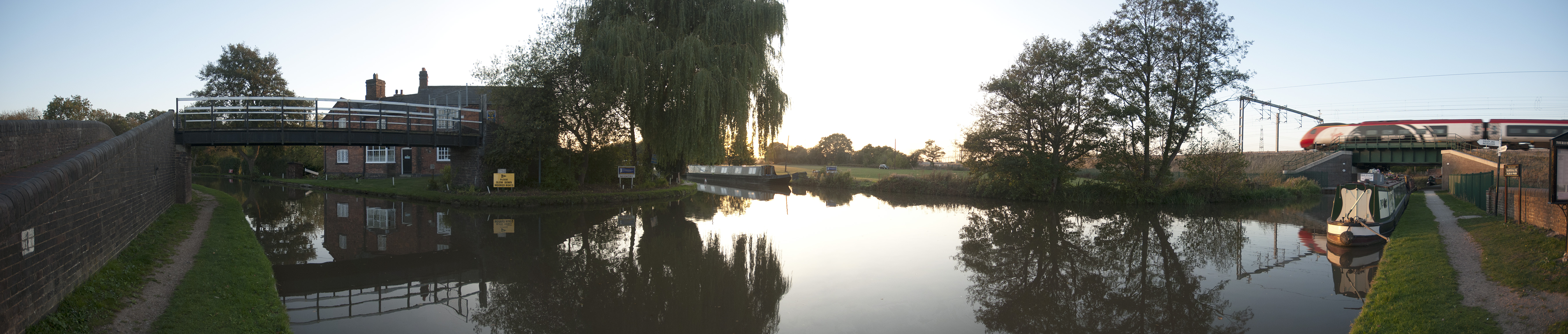
Huddlesford Junction with Coventry Canal in the foreground and Lichfield Canal in the centre

== See also ==
- Canals of the United Kingdom
- History of the British canal system

== Bibliography ==
- Cumberlidge, Jane (2009). Inland Waterways of Great Britain (8th Ed.). Imray Laurie Norie and Wilson. ISBN 978-1-84623-010-3.
- Hadfield, Charles (1985). The Canals of the West Midlands. David and Charles. ISBN 0-7153-8644-1.
- Nicholson (2003). Nicholson Guide Vol 3 - Birmingham & the Heart of England. Harper Collins. ISBN 0-00-713666-8.
- Pearson, Michael (1989). Canal Companion: Birmingham Canal Navigations. J. M. Pearson & Associates. ISBN 0-907864-49-X.
