= List of canal junctions in the United Kingdom =

This List of canal junctions in the United Kingdom is an incomplete list of canal junctions in the United Kingdom that have articles in Wikipedia, in alphabetical order.

Junction	Canals	Location	Image
Aldersley Junction, West Midlands	The Birmingham Main Line Canal terminates here. It meets the Staffordshire and Worcestershire Canal near Oxley, Wolverhampton, and one kilometre south of Autherley Junction.	grid reference SJ902011	
Aston Junction, West Midlands	Birmingham and Fazeley Canal, Digbeth Branch Canal	grid reference SP076881	
Autherley Junction, West Midlands	Shropshire Union Canal, Staffordshire and Worcestershire Canal	grid reference SJ901020	
Barbridge Junction	The Shropshire Union Canal Middlewich Branch terminates here. It meets the Shropshire Union Canal Main Line	grid reference SJ612570	
Birchills Junction	Walsall Canal, Wyrley and Essington Canal main line	grid reference SK002000	
Bordesley Junction, West Midlands	Grand Union Canal splits into mainline and north-east arm	grid reference SP084864	
Bromford Junction, West Midlands	BCN New Main Line, Spon Lane Locks Branch	grid reference SO996899	
Catshill Junction	Wyrley and Essington Canal main line, Daw End Branch Canal	grid reference SK048048	
Dukinfield Junction, Greater Manchester	Ashton Canal, Peak Forest Canal	grid reference SJ933984	Dukinfield Junction
Fazeley Junction, Staffordshire	Birmingham and Fazeley Canal, Coventry Canal	grid reference SK202020	
Fradley Junction, Staffordshire	Coventry Canal, Trent and Mersey Canal	grid reference SK140139	
Frankton Junction, Shropshire	Montgomery Canal, Llangollen Canal	grid reference SJ369318	
Hardings Wood Junction, Staffordshire	Macclesfield Canal (Hall Green Branch), Trent and Mersey Canal	grid reference SJ834546	
Hawkesbury Junction, Warwickshire	Oxford Canal, Coventry Canal	grid reference SP360846	
Haywood Junction, Staffordshire	Staffordshire and Worcestershire Canal, Trent and Mersey Canal	grid reference SJ994229	
Horseley Fields Junction, West Midlands	BCN Main Line, Wyrley and Essington Canal	grid reference SO923986	
Huddlesford Junction, Staffordshire	Coventry Canal, Wyrley and Essington Canal	grid reference SK150095	
Hurleston Junction, Cheshire	Llangollen Canal, Shropshire Union Canal main line	grid reference SJ625553	
Kings Norton Junction	Stratford-upon-Avon Canal, Worcester and Birmingham Canal	grid reference SP052794	
Kingswood Junction	Stratford-upon-Avon Canal, Grand Union Canal	grid reference SP185709	
Browning's Pool, Little Venice, London	Grand Union Canal, Regent's Canal	grid reference TQ261818	
Marple Junction	Macclesfield Canal, Peak Forest Canal	grid reference SJ961884	
Norbury Junction	Birmingham and Liverpool Junction Canal (later Shropshire Union Canal), and branch linking to Shrewsbury Canal	grid reference SJ793228	
Ogley Junction	On the Wyrley and Essington Canal where the Anglesey Branch leaves the main line	grid reference SK056060	
Old Turn Junction	The Birmingham and Fazeley Canal meets the BCN Main Line	grid reference SP059868	
Pelsall Junction	Southern limit of the Cannock Extension Canal where it meets the Wyrley and Essington Canal main line	grid reference SK018044	
Rumer Hill Junction	Former junction - now lost - on the Cannock Extension Canal where the Churchbridge Branch left to join the Hatherton Canal	grid reference SJ991090	
Rushall Junction	Southern limit of the Rushall Canal where it meets the Tame Valley Canal	grid reference SP030947	
Salford Junction	The Grand Union Canal and Tame Valley Canal meet the Birmingham and Fazeley Canal	grid reference SP095901	
Smethwick Junction	The junction of the BCN Old Main Line and the BCN New Main Line	grid reference SP028890	
Spon Lane Junction	Originally the junction of the Birmingham Canal (proceeding south-west and east) and the Wednesbury Canal (proceeding west), this now forms the junction at the top of the "canal slip road" down to the BCN New Main Line (proceeding west) and the BCN Old Main Line (proceeding south-west and east).	grid reference SP003898	
Stockingfield Junction	Originally a terminus it became the junction for the Glasgow Branch of the Forth and Clyde Canal in 1777 running to Port Dundas via Spiers Wharf by 1790. The Monkland Canal joined the branch at the Port Dundas basin.	grid reference NS571689	
Tame Valley Junction	Western limit of the Tame Valley Canal where it meets the Walsall Canal	grid reference SO976936	
Wappenshall Junction	The Newport Branch Canal joins the Shrewsbury Canal. The canals here are no longer navigable but the junction still exists.	grid reference SJ662145	

== See also ==
- Junction (canal)
- Canals of Great Britain
- History of the British canal system
- List of canal aqueducts in the United Kingdom
- List of canal basins in the United Kingdom
- List of canal locks in the United Kingdom
- List of canal tunnels in the United Kingdom
