= Birmingham and Warwick Junction Canal =

Canal in the West Midlands, England

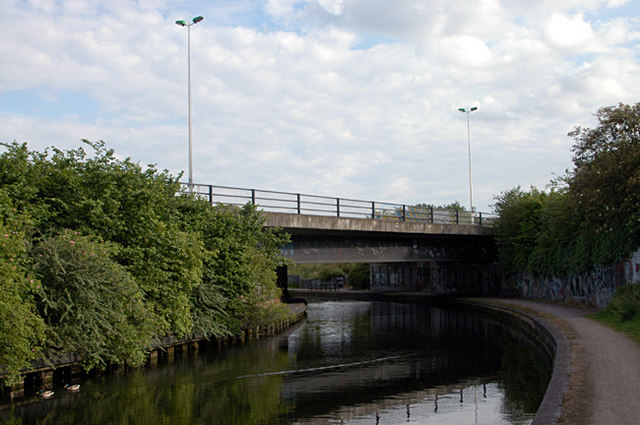
- The canal at the Heartlands Spine Road
- Interactive map of Birmingham and Warwick Junction Canal

Specifications
- Length: 2.6 miles (4.2 km)
- Maximum boat length: 72 ft 0 in (21.95 m)
- Maximum boat beam: 7 ft 0 in (2.13 m)
- Locks: 5 (originally 6)
- Status: Navigable
- Navigation authority: Canal and River Trust

History
- Original owner: Birmingham and Warwick Canal; Birmingham and Napton Canal
- Date of act: 1840
- Date of first use: 1844

Geography
- Start point: Salford Junction
- End point: Bordesley Junction
- Branch of: Grand Union Canal

Birmingham and Warwick Junction Canal Navigation Act 1840
- Act of Parliament
- Parliament of the United Kingdom
- Long title: An Act for making and maintaining a navigable Cut or Canal connecting the Warwick and Birmingham Canal with the Birmingham Canal, commencing by a Junction with the Warwick and Birmingham Canal, in the Hamlet of Bordesley in the Parish of Aston-juxta-Birmingham in the County of Warwick, and terminating by a Junction with the Birmingham Canal, near Salford Bridge, in the same Parish.
- Citation: 3 & 4 Vict. c. lvii
- Territorial extent: United Kingdom

Dates
- Royal assent: 4 June 1840
- Commencement: 4 June 1840 (Note: Section 1.)
Other legislation
Amends	Birmingham Canal Navigations Act 1835

Text of statute as originally enacted

The Birmingham and Warwick Junction Canal is a short canal connecting the Warwick and Birmingham Canal at Bordesley Junction in Birmingham (52.47570°N 1.87715°W) to the Birmingham and Fazeley Canal at Salford Junction near Gravelly Hill Interchange (52.50855°N 1.85926°W). It was authorised in 1840 to relieve pressure on the overcrowded locks at the eastern end of the Birmingham Canal Navigations system. Boats travelling along it had to negotiate six locks, rather than the six of the Ashted flight and the eleven of the Aston flight. The connection to the Grand Junction Canal leading to London (now part of the Grand Union Canal) opened in 1844. It is 2.6 miles (4.2 km) long and had six locks, although the stop lock known as Nechells Shallow Lock, at the northern end of the canal, has now been decommissioned, and its gates removed.

== History ==
During the 1830s, the Birmingham Canal Navigations (BCN) had been upgraded to improve the flow of traffic. James Brindley's main line, now known as the BCN Old Main Line, which had followed the contours, had been reduced in length from 22.6 miles (36.4 km) to 15.6 miles (25.1 km) by Thomas Telford, with the new route known as the BCN New Main Line. The company was left with overcrowded locks at the eastern end of the new main line. Traffic from the BCN and the Worcester and Birmingham Canal descended through thirteen locks at Farmers Bridge. If it was bound for London via the Warwick and Birmingham Canal, it then turned right along the Digbeth Branch and descended the six locks of the Ashted Flight. If it was heading for the north east along the Birmingham and Fazeley Canal, it descended through the eleven locks of the Aston Flight to Salford.

Proposals to remedy this had been made in 1793, 1810 and 1811, but had been thwarted by objections from the Worcester and Birmingham Canal and the Warwick and Birmingham Canal, who feared that they would lose trade. The plans were revived in 1838, with the Tame Valley Canal providing a northern bypass for the overloaded locks. In 1839, it was noted that the Farmers Bridge locks were open 24 hour a day, including on Sundays, and yet there were often 20 to 30 boats queueing to use them at both the top and bottom of the flight, particularly during the autumn and winter months. A new route from Bordesley to Salford bridge had been proposed in 1836, and the Warwick and Birmingham Canal had requested the BCN build it in 1839, but they declined to do so. An independent bill was submitted to Parliament for the canal, called the Birmingham and Warwick Junction Canal, and again the BCN objected.

Despite the objections the Birmingham and Warwick Junction Canal Navigation Act 1840 (3 & 4 Vict. c. lvii) received Parliamentary approval on 4 June 1840. The canal had been surveyed by Frederick Wood, and was financed by the Birmingham and Warwick Canal and the Warwick and Napton Canal, because their canals were likely to benefit from it. The engineer for the project was James Potter, while Clarkson and Hall were employed as contractors to build it. It was about 2.6 miles (4.2 km) long, and descended through six locks, saving considerable time compared to the 17 locks of the Ashted and Aston flights. The work was completed in 1844, and the canal opened on 14 February, the same day as the Tame Valley Canal opened.

Officers for the company were drawn from the two canals who financed it. 600 shares, valued at £100 each, were issued, the Warwick and Birmingham Canal holding 335, and the Warwick and Napton Canal holding 265. The cost of construction was £112,579, with the additional capital provided through loans of £52,579 by the two companies, split according to their share holding. After the first year, the canal was managed as if it were part of the Warwick and Birmingham Canal, with no separate minute books being kept. Water that descended through the locks was collected in Saltley Reservoir, from where it was pumped to the top of Camp Hill Locks, a flight of six locks immediately to the south of Bordesley Junction on the Warwick and Birmingham main line.

=== Operation ===
Because there were no separate minute books, little is known of how the Junction Canal fared after construction. though it made some profit, as the loans were repaid to the two Warwick canals, and profits were then split, with the Warwick and Birmingham receiving twenty-two thirty-sevenths of the proceeds, and the Warwick and Napton receiving the rest. The canal opened as the Warwick canals began facing competition from the railways, particularly the London and Birmingham Railway. Dividends paid by the Warwick and Birmingham Canal dropped from nine percent in 1845 to four percent in 1850, two percent in 1853, and then ceased. In 1845 the unwieldy-named London & Birmingham Extension & Northampton, Daventy, Leamington & Warwick Railway offered to buy the three Warwick canals, to convert them into railways. The railway company paid £10,000 in deposits, but decided that the idea would not be sanctioned by Parliament. Instead they suggested that a new company be set up to buy the canals and convert them. The Warwick canals rejected the idea, but kept the deposits.

With income dropping rapidly, management of the Warwick and Birmingham Canal was handled by a receiver. The company was reconstructed, and managed to resume dividend payments in 1859, although this only amounted to three percent. In 1895, the Warwick canals tried to amalgamate with the Grand Junction Canal, but the Parliamentary bill to authorise it was withdrawn. The canal carriers Fellows Morton & Clayton offered to lease the canals in 1903, intending to providing electric traction on the London to Birmingham route. Nothing came of the electrification proposal, although they did guarantee to move 100,000 tons of cargo per year along the canals, and from 1904, 70,000 tons per year. A joint management committee was appointed in 1917, consisting of four members from the Warwick and Birmingham and three from the Warwick and Napton. On 1 January 1929 the three Warwick canals were bought by the Regent's Canal company to become part of the Grand Union Canal.

In order to increase capacity of the new canal, 52 narrow locks between Camp Hill and Calcutt were converted to weirs, and wide locks which were 83.5 by 15 feet (25.5 by 4.6 m) were built nearby. The depth of the canal was increased to 5.5 feet (1.7 m). The work was complete in 1934, but the Camp Hill lock flight and the locks on the former Birmingham and Warwick Junction Canal were not widened as they only led to other narrow canals. Despite trading difficulties in the 1940s, the canals remained open, to be taken over by the British Transport Commission in 1948, and transferred to the British Waterways Board in 1962. Since 2012, they have been the responsibility of the Canal and River Trust.

== Route ==
The northerly end of the canal is at Salford Junction, where it joins the Birmingham and Fazeley Canal. The Tame Valley Canal also starts at the junction, before heading towards the north west. The junction is below the elevated M6 motorway on the edge of the Gravelly Hill Interchange, known to many people as Spaghetti Junction. The canal heads southwards with a towpath on the west bank, while the Birmingham and Fazeley Canal continues to the south-west, with a towpath on the east bank. Two bridges cross the canals, enabling towpath users to reach the towpaths on the Tame Valley Canal and the Birmingham and Fazeley Canal as it heads eastwards. Beneath the motorway are two aqueducts, where both canals cross the River Tame.

The canal reaches the site of Nechells Shallow Lock, once a stop lock to limit the amount of water that passed between the two canals at their junction, but now with no gates. It was called Salford Bridge Lock in 1904. The B4137 Cuckoo Road crosses on a bridge, after which there is another aqueduct crossing the River Rea, a tributary of the Tame. The river then runs along the west bank of the canal, until both are crossed by the Heartlands Spine Road, which was built in the 1990s. Between these two points, the railway from Stechford to Aston railway station and Aston Church Road cross. Sandwiched between the east bank of the canal and another railway line was Saltley Reservoir, from where water was pumped to Camp Hill Locks. The pumps were initially driven by a Boulton and Watt steam engine. Diesel engines were installed to drive centrifugal pumps in 1936, and these were subsequently replaced by electric motors.

The Heartlands Spine Road now runs between the canal and railway over the reservoir site, but an overflow is being moved as part of the High Speed 2 rail link enabling works. The railway line from Water Orton to Birmingham New Street crosses the canal close to the Spine Road, and there will be a new bridge for the High Speed 2 rail link next to it. The next crossing in the B4114 road on Saltley Viaduct.

The ascent to Bordesley Junction begin soon afterwards. There are five locks, beginning with Garrison Bottom Lock and ending with Garrison Top Lock. Sources differ as to where they are located, with the Ordnance Survey placing the bottom lock to the north of Duddleston Mill Road bridge and Nicholson placing it to the south. Between the third and fourth lock, the railway line from Adderley Park station crosses, and after the locks the canal threads its way beneath a maze of small bridges, and a larger bridge carrying the A4540 dual carriageway, before it reaches Bordesley Junction.

== Bibliography ==
- Broadbridge, S R (1974). The Birmingham Canal Navigations Volume 1 1768–1846. David and Charles. ISBN 978-0-7153-6381-2.
- Hadfield, Charles (1970). The Canals of the East Midlands. David and Charles. ISBN 978-0-7153-4871-0.
- Hadfield, Charles (1985). The Canals of the West Midlands. David and Charles. ISBN 978-0-7153-8644-6.
- Nicholson (2003). Nicholson Guides Vol 3: Birmingham and the Heart of England. Harper Collins. ISBN 978-0-00-713666-7.
