= Tame Valley =

Tame Valley may refer to:

- Tame Valley Canal, a canal in the English Midlands
- Tame Valley Junction, where the Tame Valley Canal meets the Walsall Canal
- Tame Valley, the geographical area surrounding the River Tame, Greater Manchester, between Saddleworth and Stockport
- Tame Valley, the geographical area surrounding the River Tame, West Midlands, between Birmingham and Tamworth
- Tame Valley Industrial Estate, Tamworth

== See also ==
- Teme Valley
