= Salford Junction =

Canal junction in Birmingham, England

Coordinates: 52°30′31″N 1°51′33″W

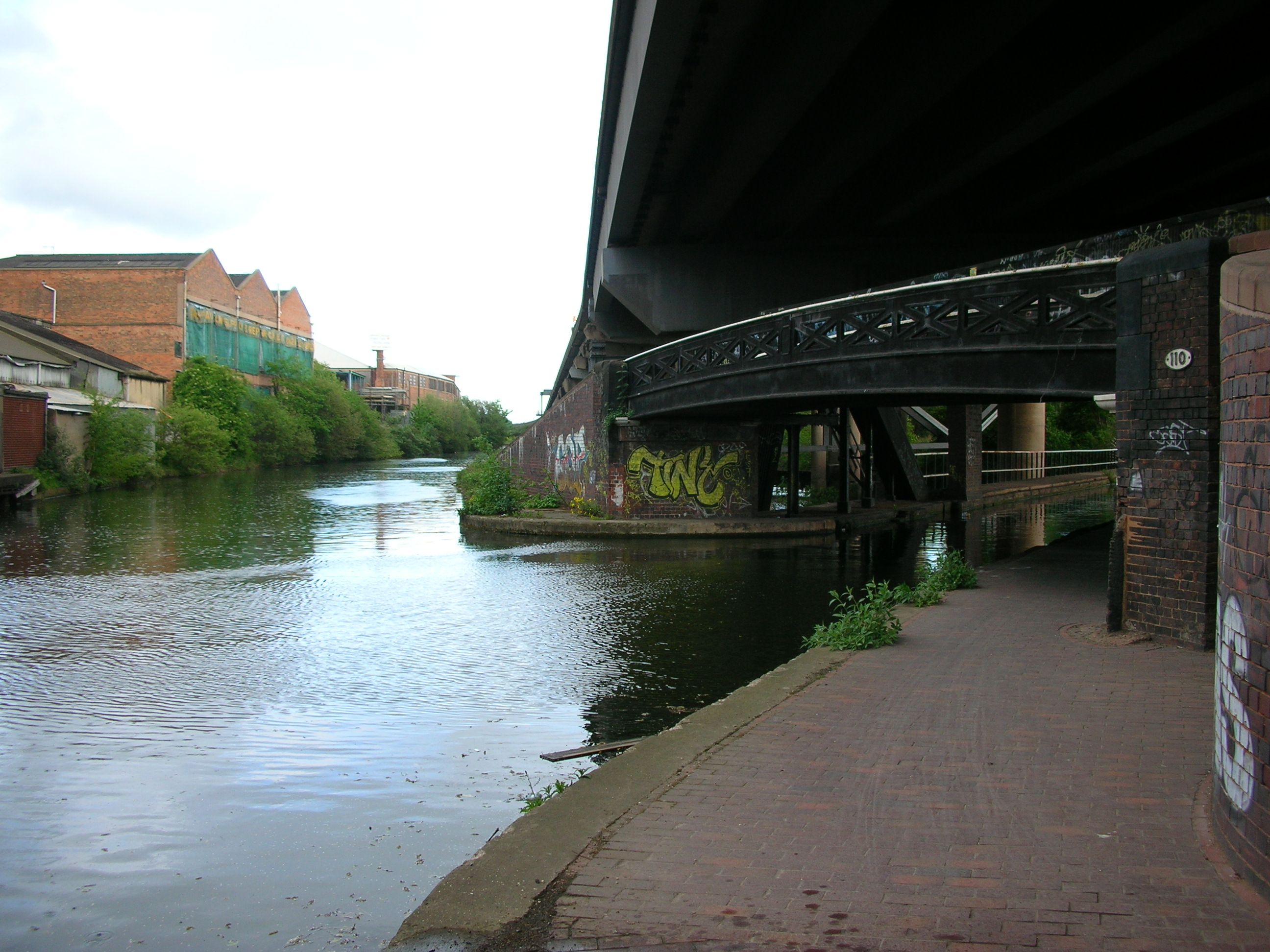
- To Fazeley ahead, to Bordesley Junction right
- Interactive map of Salford Junction

Specifications
- Status: Open
- Navigation authority: Canal and River Trust

History
- Date completed: 1844

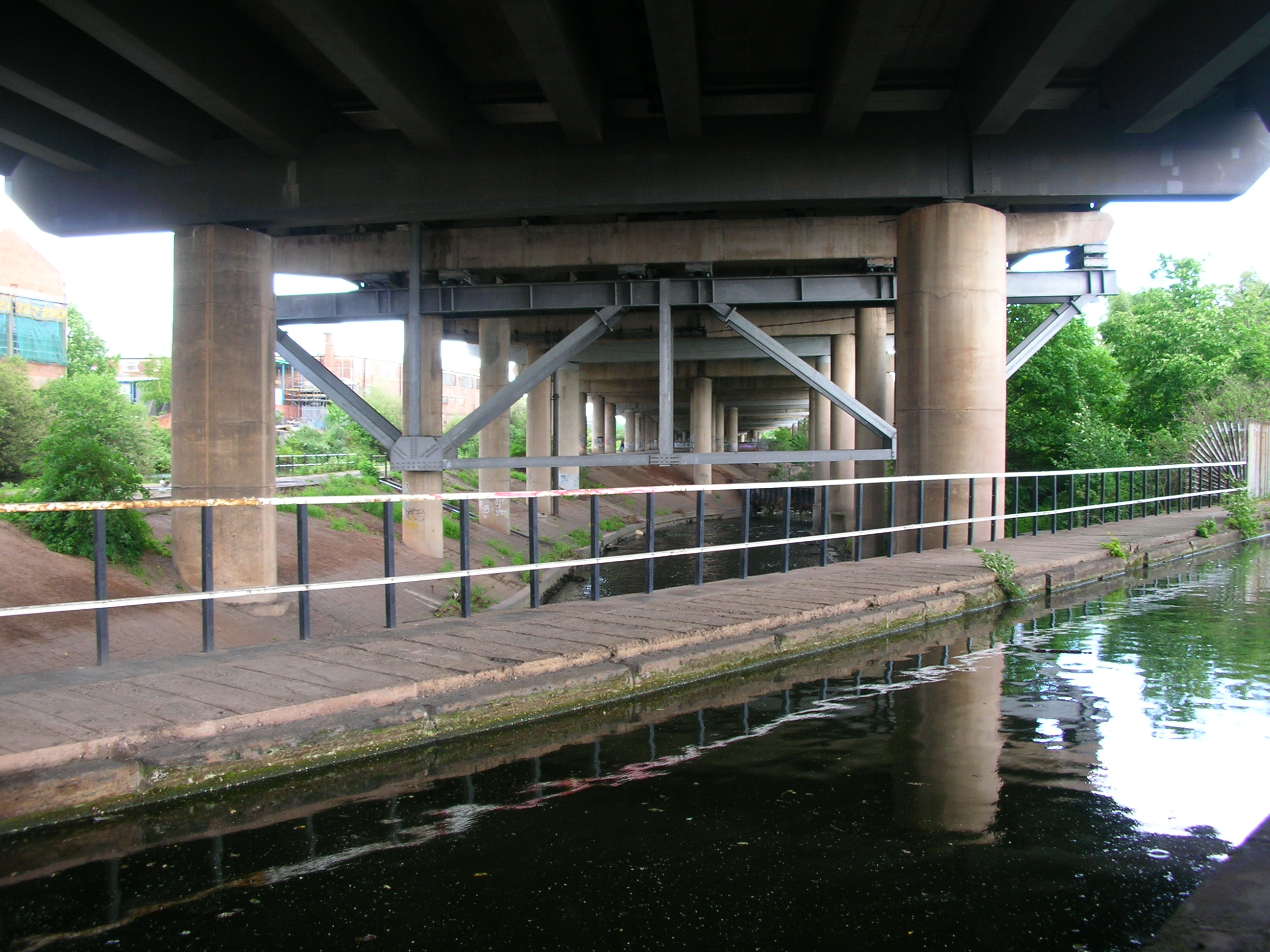
The Grand Union Canal above the River Tame and below the M6 motorway

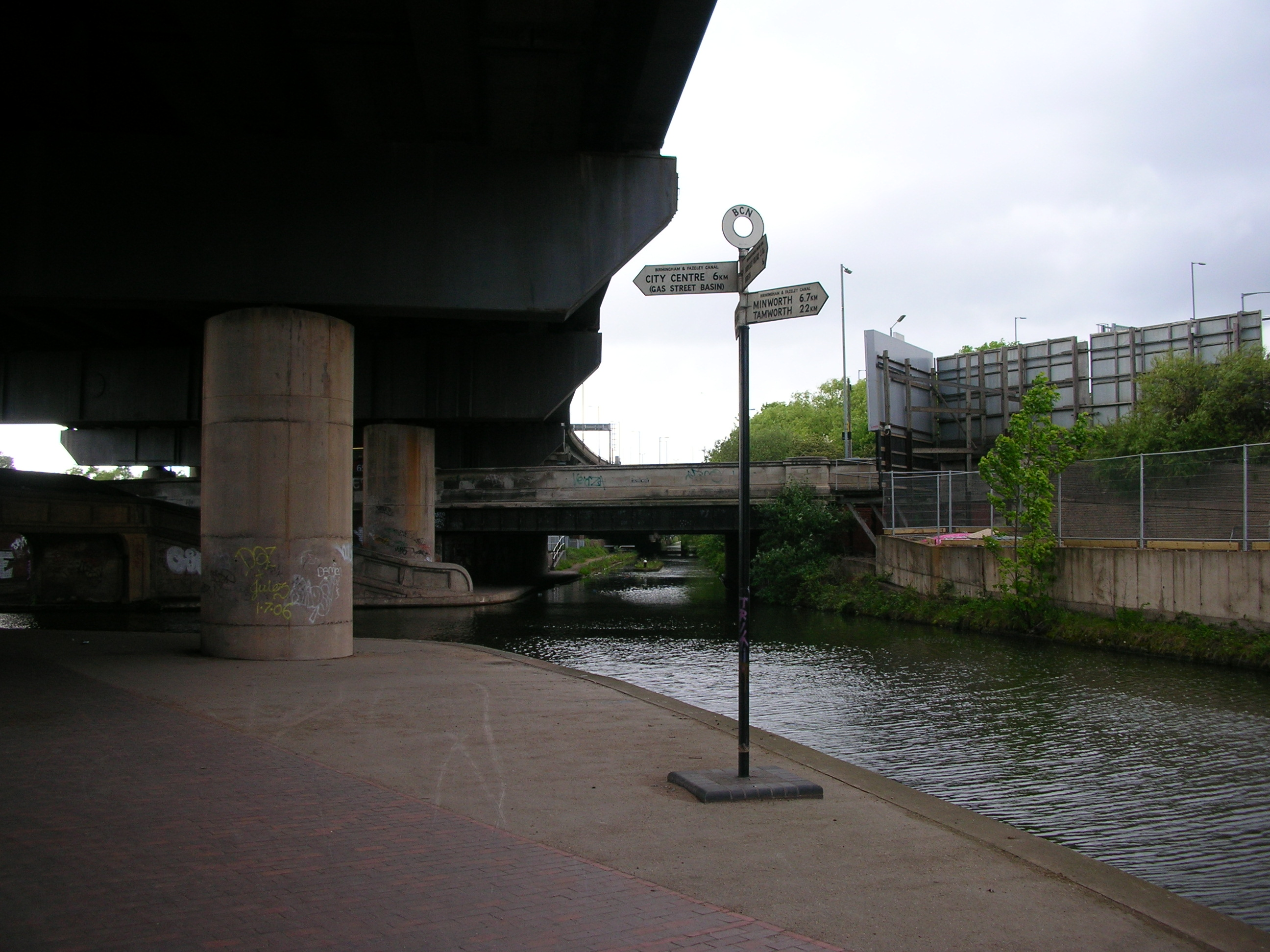
Start of the Tame Valley Canal with its toll island. To Birmingham, left

Salford Junction (grid reference SP095901) is the canal junction of the Grand Union and Tame Valley Canals with the Birmingham and Fazeley Canal. It is in the north of the administrative city of Birmingham, England and historically marked a tripoint between two divisions of Aston to the south and Erdington to the north. It is directly east of most of the Gravelly Hill Interchange (Spaghetti Junction). With Aston and Bordesley Junctions it forms a circuit, at the heart of Birmingham's thirty-five miles of canals.

== History ==
Salford Junction became a double junction on 14 February 1844 when the Grand Union Canal and Tame Valley Canal joined the Birmingham and Fazeley Canal. Prior to this, the Birmingham and Fazeley Canal crossed the River Tame via a seven-arched aqueduct, each with a span of 18 feet. T & S Element opened boatyards at Salford Bridge in 1932 which soon became the company's head office. Spencer, Abbott and Company owned a boatbuilding yard at the junction too, however traces of these companies no longer exist.

A bridge has been recorded as being at this location since 1536 during the reign of King Henry VIII, however it is believed to have existed since 1290. In the document where it is first mentioned, it is named Shrafford Brugge and described as having four arches of stone. "Shrafford" is a Saxon word meaning "the ford by the caves". The caves were natural, water formed cavities in the face of the nearby Copeley Hill escarpment, which were used as air-raid shelters in World War II and were finally removed upon the construction of Spaghetti Junction. The bridge was to be repaired by the parish of Aston, however, when it was destroyed by Roundhead Parliamentary troops during the English Civil War, reparation costs were charged to the county. The bridge was reconstructed in 1810 to convert the footbridge into a road bridge. It was designed by John Couchman (1771–1838), who was paid £3,800 for the work (equivalent to £258,000 in 2025). The bridge was crossed by a road connecting Birmingham to Lichfield. It was destroyed during the construction of Spaghetti Junction.

== Location ==
One of the Birmingham terminations of the Grand Union Canal (originally here named the Birmingham and Warwick Junction Canal) is under the M6 motorway just east of Gravelly Hill Interchange ("Spaghetti Junction", M6 Junction 6). Here, at Salford Junction, it meets the end of the Tame Valley Canal and the Birmingham and Fazeley Canal to Birmingham (south) and Tamworth (north-west). Above Salford Junction are the slip roads to Birmingham's busiest motorway junction. Below it are the confluences of the Hockley Brook and River Rea into the River Tame.

== Bibliography ==
- Clayton, Phil (2005). "Junctions of the BCN (Part Two)". Birmingham Canal Navigations Society.
- Jones, Douglas V. (1989). The Story of Erdington - From Sleepy Hamlet to Thriving Suburb. Westwood Press. ISBN 0-948025-05-0.
- Pearson, Michael (1989). Canal Companion - Birmingham Canal Navigations. J. M. Pearson & Associates. ISBN 0-907864-49-X.
- Priestley, Joseph (1831). "Historical Account of the Navigable Rivers, Canals and Railways of Great Britain".
- Skempton, Sir Alec; et al. (2002). A Biographical Dictionary of Civil Engineers in Great Britain and Ireland: Vol 1: 1500 to 1830. Thomas Telford. ISBN 0-7277-2939-X.
- Stephens, W. B. (1964). Communications: A History of the County of Warwick: Volume 7: The City of Birmingham. Victoria County History – via British History Online.
