= Worsley Braided Interchange =

Large motorway interchange in the United Kingdom

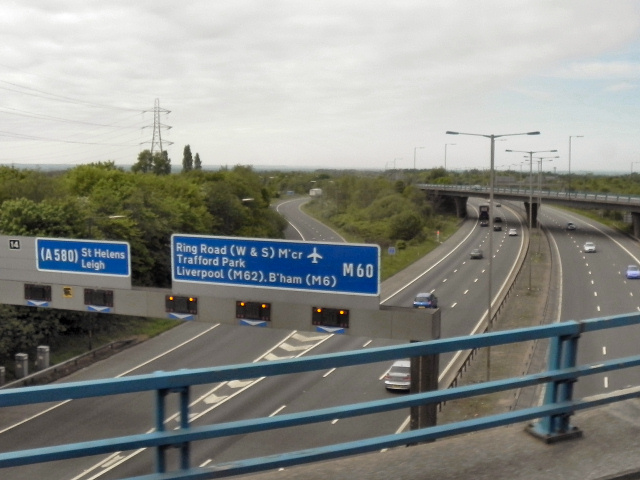
- Worsley Braided Interchange in April 2011
- Interactive map of Worsley Braided Interchange

Location
- City of Salford
- Coordinates: 53.524°N 2.363°W
- Roads at junction: M61; A6

Construction
- Type: 2-level stack interchange
- Opened: 14 October 1970
- Maintained by: National Highways

The Worsley Braided Interchange is a large motorway interchange in the United Kingdom.

== History ==
=== Planning ===
Formal planning began on 12 July 1961, when the government authorised the two surveyors of Lancashire and the West Riding - James Drake of Lancashire and Stuart Maynard Lovell of the West Riding, to plan a 50-mile (80 km) motorway from Worsley, in Lancashire, to Ledsham in the West Riding. From either end, the plan was that there would be improved roads from the eastern end, and from the western end, at Worsley, westwards to Liverpool.

The draft plan of the 24-mile (39 km) section from Worsley to Outlane was published in October 1963, with the further 19 miles (31 km) published on 28 February 1964.

The 5 1/2-mile (8.9 km) section route of the M61 to Middle Hulton (junction 4) was fixed on, including the interchange, on 22 March 1967.

In 1967, the junction was designed to carry around 150,000 vehicles per day.

Diagram of the interchange

=== Construction ===
Construction of the interchange began in the middle of 1967.

The M61 section to Worsley began on 1 January 1969, costing £12,434,103, and was to open by the end of December 1970, being built by a consortium of Sir Alfred McAlpine and Leonard Fairclough & Son (who built the bridges).

The A580-M62 interchange was built by A. Monk Ltd of Padgate. A contract for 4.1 miles of the M62 was given to Monk Ltd, costing £6,143,887, being built from May 1968, from the A580 to the A56 at Whitefield. Monk was also building Spaghetti Junction, Birmingham.

The interchange was planned to open by May 1970. There are 62 bridges.

=== Lighting ===
The junction was fully lit. The lighting cost £500,000 alone. It had a longitudinal catenary lighting system. This overhead lighting system was the first of its kind in the UK. It had 16 miles of conventional lighting and nine miles of catenary lighting, with Phillips lights. The lights were connected with Aerialite armoured cable, being 42 miles long. It was removed in 1998. The road markings were reflectorised Sprayplastic.

=== Opening ===
The section connected to the M62 opened on 14 October 1970, and the section connected to the M61 opened on 17 December 1970.
