= Digbeth Branch Canal =

Short canal in Birmingham

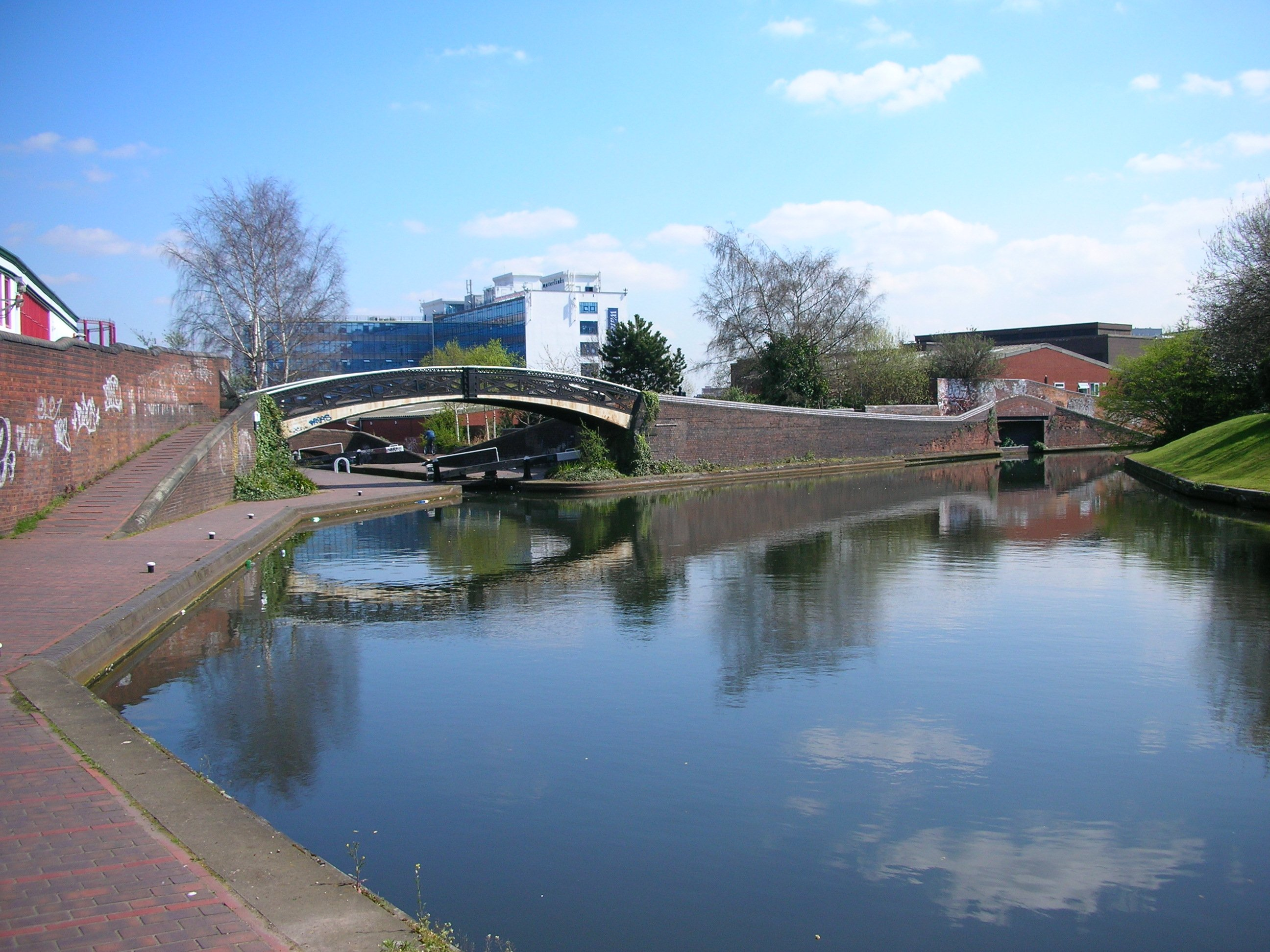
Aston Junction. The Digbeth Branch Canal begins, top right.

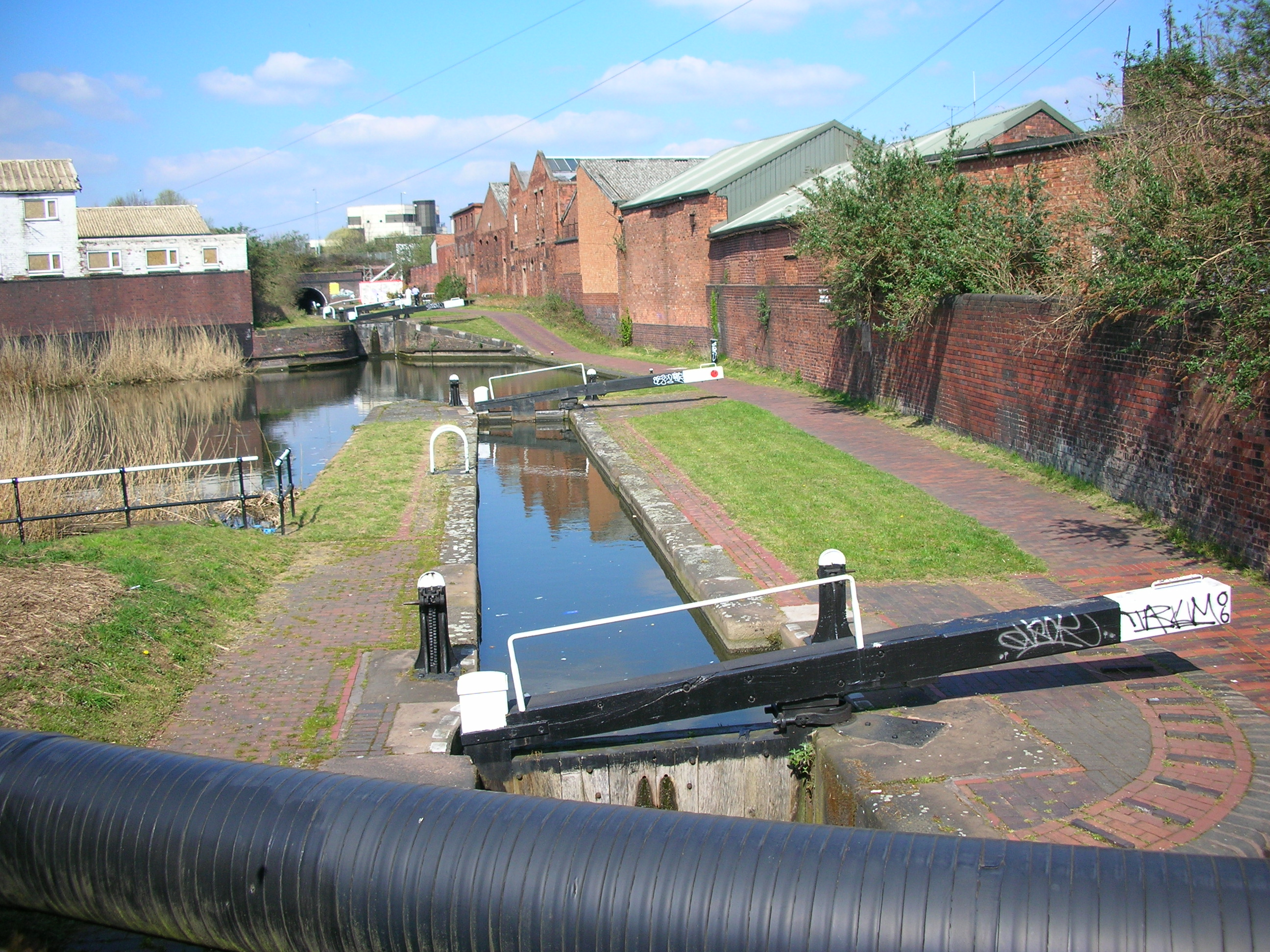
Locks on the Digbeth Branch

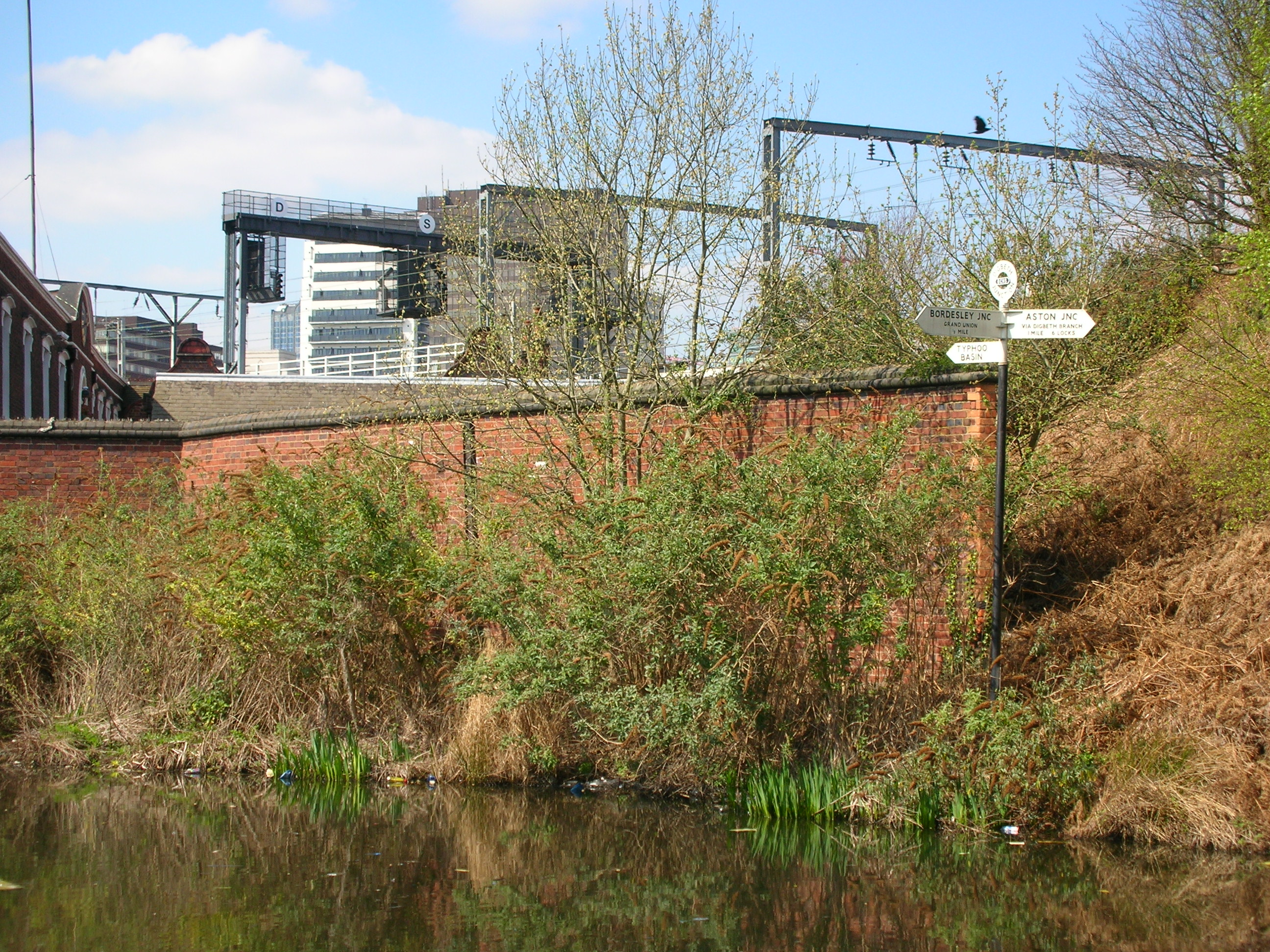
Proof House Junction

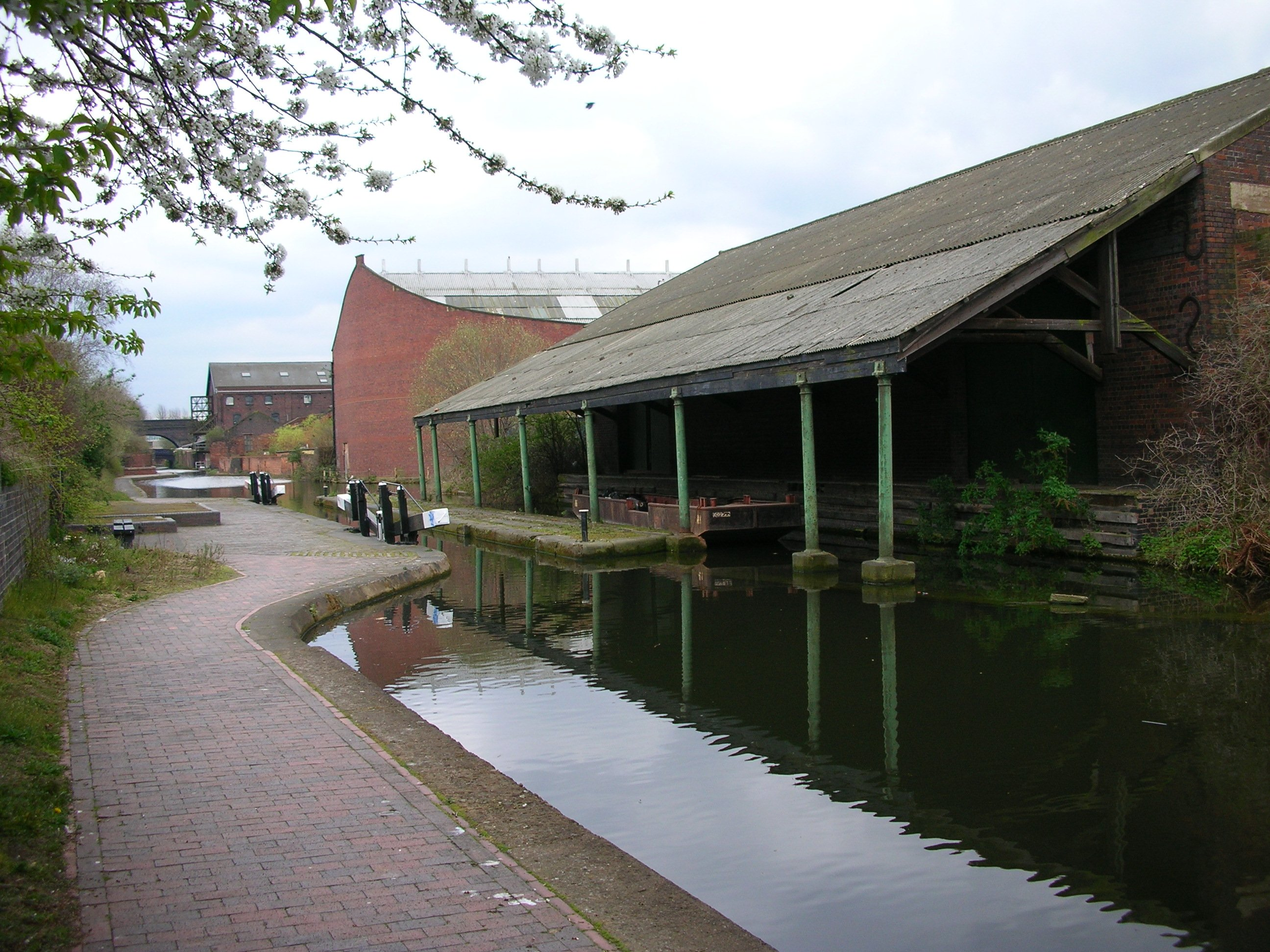
The Warwick Bar stop lock and Banana Warehouse

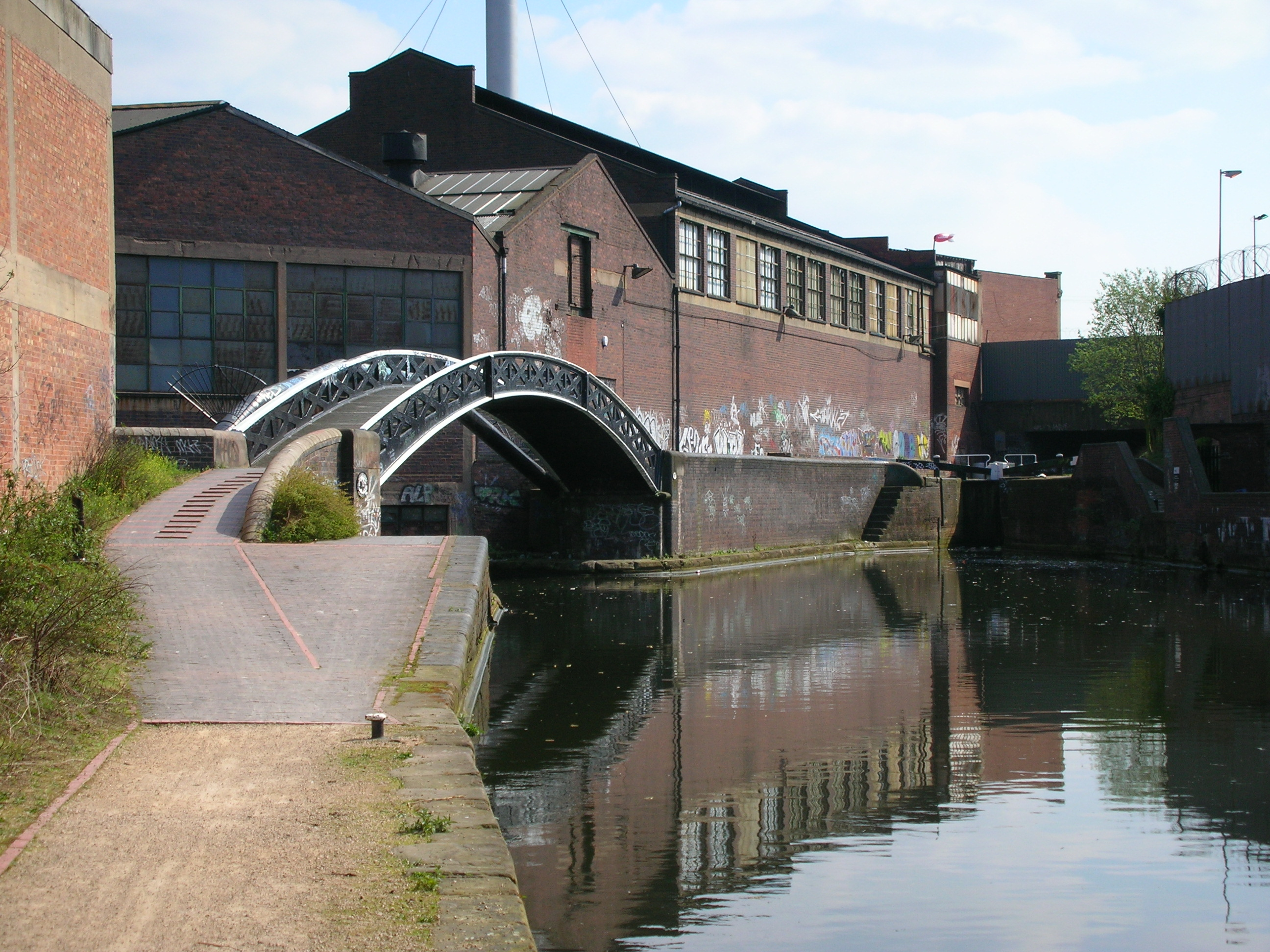
Bordesley Junction

The Digbeth Branch Canal in Birmingham, England is a short canal which links the mainline of the Birmingham and Fazeley Canal at Aston Junction and the Grand Union Canal at Digbeth Junction (or historically, at the adjacent Warwick Bar) in Digbeth, a district in Birmingham, England.

Completed in 1799 the Digbeth Branch of the Birmingham Canal Navigations provided a route for traffic between the mainline of the Birmingham and Fazeley Canal, and thus the Birmingham Canal mainline, to and from the Warwick and Birmingham Canal (now part of the Grand Union Canal), initially via transshipment over a short physical gap between the canals called the Warwick Bar, with a stop lock later allowing through passage of boats.

The 1¼ mile long canal has six locks descending 40 feet from Aston Junction; the final lock will be located under the final approach to High Speed 2's Birmingham Curzon Street railway station. After that final lock, the canal passes through a grade II listed tunnel carrying the lines eastwards from Birmingham New Street railway station, and originally the lines to the original Curzon Street station. Beyond the tunnel is Digbeth Junction. From the junction there is a short branch to the Typhoo Basin.

In modern times, Digbeth Junction is sometimes regarded as the junction with the Grand Union Canal, but historically the through route goes a little further, under a former railway bridge, and meets the Grand Union Canal (originally the Warwick and Birmingham Canal) at the Warwick Bar stop lock just to the rear of Birmingham Proof House.

From here, the Grand Union Canal continues the route onwards to Bordesley Junction.

All of the canal between Ashted Lock at Jennens Road (formerly the A47) and Great Barr Street (Bordesley) is within the Warwick Bar Conservation Area.

== Features ==
Point	Coordinates
Aston Junction	52.49020°N 1.88850°W
Ashted Lock	52.48625°N 1.88401°W
Ashted tunnel North portal	52.48187°N 1.88191°W
Ashted tunnel South portal	52.48080°N 1.88295°W
Railway viaduct	52.48082°N 1.88451°W
Proof House Junction	52.48028°N 1.88411°W
Warwick Bar	52.47985°N 1.88338°W
River Rea	52.47897°N 1.88192°W
Great Barr Street	52.47783°N 1.87996°W
Bordesley Junction	52.47565°N 1.87719°W

== See also ==
- Canals of Great Britain
- History of the British canal system
