= Aston Junction =

Canal junction in Birmingham, England

Coordinates: 52°29′25″N 1°53′19″W

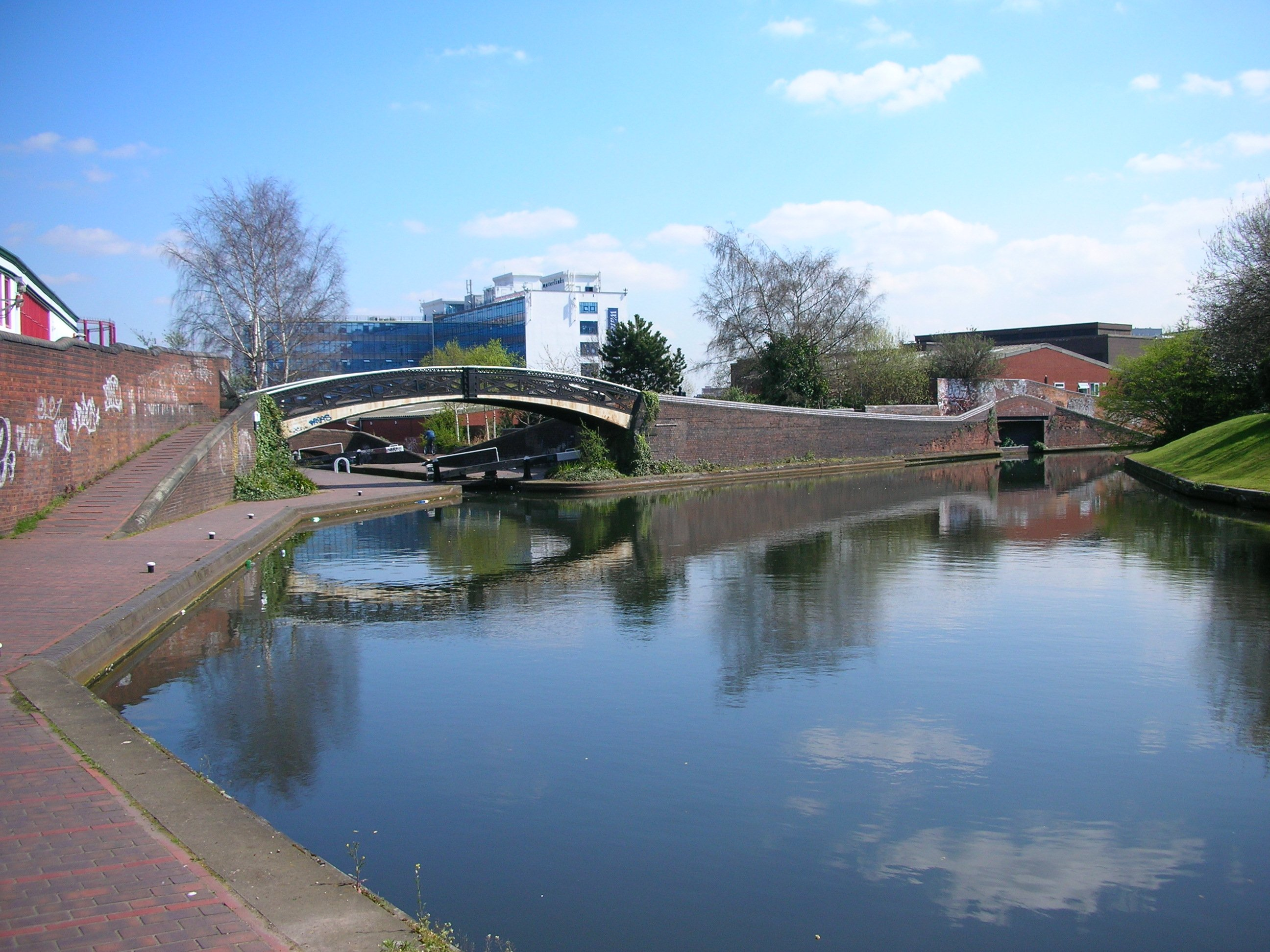
- The Aston flight of locks to Salford Junction is to the left, and the Digbeth Branch to the right.
- Interactive map of Aston Junction

Specifications
- Status: Open
- Navigation authority: British Waterways

History
- Date completed: 1799

Aston Junction (grid reference SP076881) is the name of the canal junction where the Digbeth Branch Canal terminates and meets the Birmingham and Fazeley Canal near to Aston, Birmingham, England.

== History ==
The Birmingham and Fazeley Canal was authorised by an act of Parliament in 1784, once the company had negotiated an agreement with the Oxford Canal, the Coventry Canal and the Trent and Mersey Canal to ensure that the links between the existing end of the Coventry Canal at Atherstone and the Trent and Mersey at Fradley Junction, and from the end of the Oxford Canal to the River Thames at Oxford would be built. The Atherstone to Fradley link would connect with the end of the Birmingham and Fazeley at Fazeley Junction. The company wanted to ensure that the canal would be part of a larger network, once completed, that would carry trade to London. The canal was completed from Farmers Bridge Junction, in the heart of Birmingham, to Fazeley in 1789, and the connecting links were completed in the following year.

Shortly after the passing of the act, the Birmingham and Fazeley Canal merged with the Birmingham Canal Company and eventually became known as the Birmingham Canal Navigations. The Digbeth Branch, which joined the original Birmingham and Fazeley line at Aston Junction, was built using the powers of the Birmingham Canal Navigation Act 1768 (8 Geo. 3. c. 38), although the work was not undertaken until 1799. It was a short branch with six locks, which terminated at Typhoo Basin. Just before the end of the branch was a junction with the Warwick and Birmingham Canal, which became part of the Grand Union Canal following amalgamations in 1929.

The junction was increasingly congested, as it was the main link between the Birmingham Canal network and the Warwick and Birmingham Canal route to London. Travel in any direction from the junction involved a flight of locks, and options to bypass the Farmers Bridge locks had been under consideration since 1793. On 14 February 1844, the congestion was significantly reduced by the simultaneous opening of the Tame Valley Canal, which bypassed the Birmingham Canal Navigations main line, and an extension of the Warwick and Birmingham Canal from Bordesley Junction to Salford Junction, enabling boats to avoid ascending through the eleven locks of the Aston flight and then descending through the six locks of the Ashted flight on the Digbeth Branch. Instead, the Garrison flight on the new line had just five locks.

== Location ==
From the junction, the Birmingham and Fazeley Canal heads to the south-west and ascends through the 13 Farmers Bridge locks, rising 81 feet (25 m) to reach Farmers Bridge Junction, 1.3 miles (2.1 km) away. To the north-east, it descends through the eleven locks of the Aston flight, to reach Salford junction, 1.8 miles (2.9 km) away, where it is joined by the Tame Valley Canal and the Grand Union Canal. The Digbeth Branch heads south-east, and is just 0.9 miles (1.4 km) long. Typhoo Basin is also known as Digbeth Basin or Bordesley Basin.

Aston Junction is notable in having two bridges serving the same lock; an iron Horseley bridge at the top and a brick bridge at the bottom.

== See also ==
- List of canal junctions in Great Britain
- List of canal aqueducts in Great Britain
- List of canal basins in Great Britain
- List of canal locks in Great Britain
- List of canal tunnels in Great Britain

== Bibliography ==
- Cumberlidge, Jane (2009). Inland Waterways of Great Britain (8th Ed.). Imray Laurie Norie and Wilson. ISBN 978-1-84623-010-3.
- Hadfield, Charles (1985). The Canals of the West Midlands. David and Charles. ISBN 0-7153-8644-1.
- Nicholson (2003). Nicholson Guide Vol 3: Birmingham and the Heart of England. Harper Collins.
- Pearson, Michael (1989). Canal Companion - Birmingham Canal Navigations. J. M. Pearson & Associates. ISBN 0-907864-49-X.
