= Tame Valley Junction =

Canal junction

Coordinates: 52°32′24″N 2°02′07″W

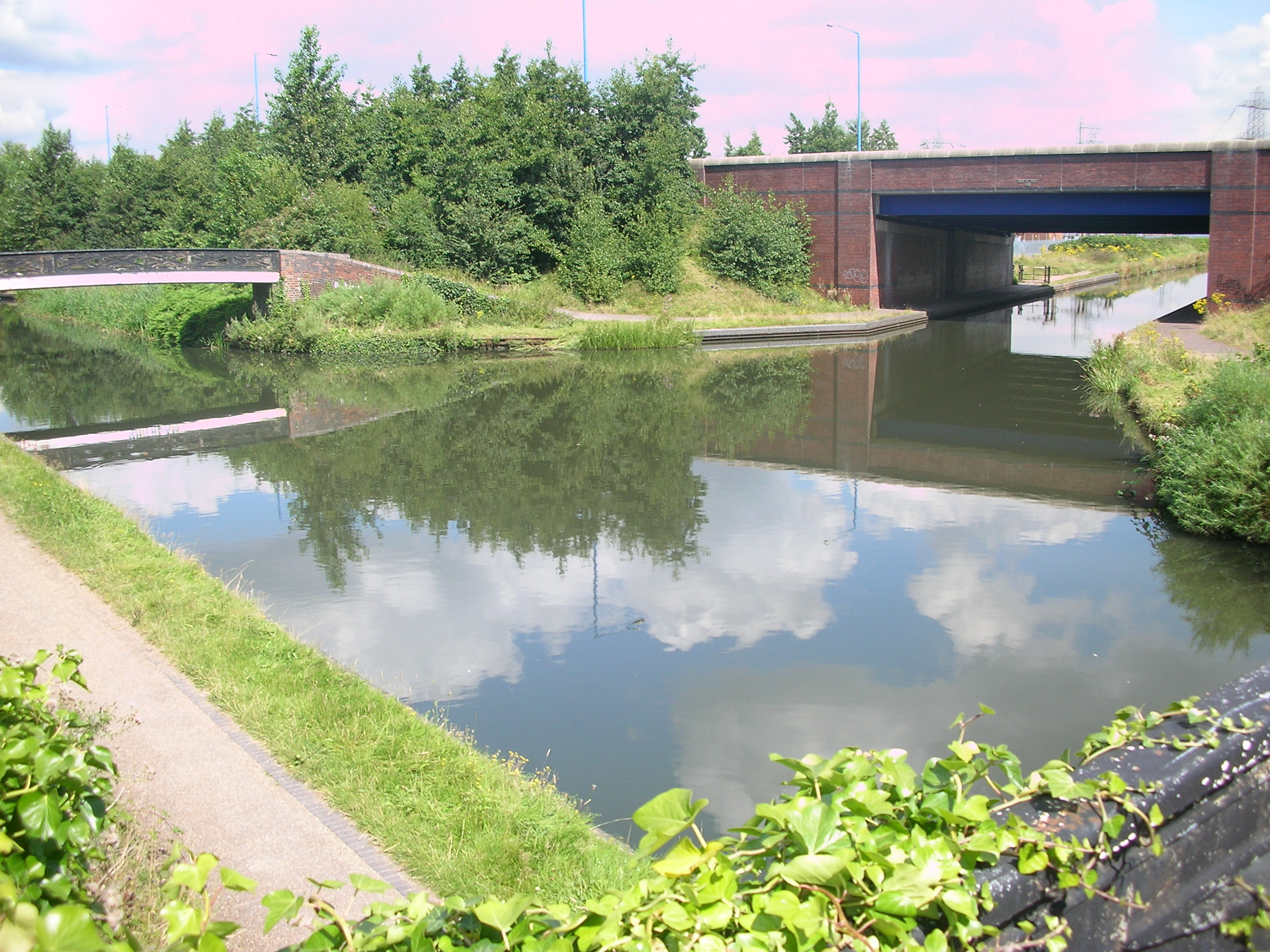
- Tame Valley Junction with the Tame Valley Canal leading eastwards under the bridge on the right.

Specifications
- Status: Open
- Navigation authority: Canal & River Trust

History
- Date completed: 1844

Tame Valley Junction (grid reference SO976936), also known as Doe Bank Junction, is a canal junction at the western limit of the Tame Valley Canal where it meets the Walsall Canal, south of Walsall, in the West Midlands, England.

== History ==
The Walsall Canal eventually formed a through route between the Birmingham Canal Navigations main line at Pudding Green, and the Wyrley and Essington Canal at Birchills Junction, but it was built in several stages over many years. The first section from Pudding Lane Junction to Ryders Green Junction was part of the Wednesbury Canal, which ran to Hill Top in West Bromwich, and opened in 1769. The next part to be opened was authorised by the Act of Parliament for the Birmingham and Fazeley Canal, although it was never connected to their main line. It was built by the Birmingham Canal Navigations, as the two companies merged once the Act had been obtained. It ran from Ryders Green Junction to Broadwaters, a mining complex near Moxley, and opened in 1786. This section includes the site of the Tame Valley Junction.

A connection from Broadwaters to Walsall was first proposed in 1793, and the link was eventually opened in 1799. The through route was completed after the merger of the Wyrley and Essington and the Birmingham Canal Navigations. A short branch containing eight locks linking Walsall to Birchills was opened in 1841.

The Tame Valley Canal was a solution to the problem of congestion at Farmers Bridge Locks, which was the main link between the Birmingham system and the route to London via the Warwick and Birmingham Canal. The canal provided a connection from Tame Valley Junction to Salford Junction, from where another new canal, the Birmingham and Warwick Junction Canal connected to Bordesley Junction. Both canals were authorised at the same time and opened on 14 February 1844. Together they provided a northern bypass around the congestion. The route from Salford Junction to Warwick and on to London became part of the Grand Union Canal in 1929.

== Location ==
From the junction, the Walsall Canal is level as it heads south for 0.6 miles (0.97 km) to the bottom of Ryders Green Locks, a flight of eight which takes the canal to the Wednesbury Old Canal. Travelling to the north, the pound is level for 5.7 miles (9.2 km) to the foot of the eight Walsall Locks. To the east, the Tame Valley Canal is level for 5.7 miles (9.2 km) to the top of Perry Bar Locks, a flight of eleven.

The Tame Valley Canal has towpaths on both sides, and the Walsall Canal towpath is on the west bank at the junction. The cast iron bridge with brick abutments which carries the towpath over the Walsall Canal to the north of the junction is a grade II listed structure, as is the similar bridge to the south.

== See also ==
- Canals of the United Kingdom
- History of the British canal system

== Bibliography ==
- Cumberlidge, Jane (2009). Inland Waterways of Great Britain (8th Ed.). Imray Laurie Norie and Wilson. ISBN 978-1-84623-010-3.
- Hadfield, Charles (1970). The Canals of the East Midlands. David and Charles. ISBN 0-7153-4871-X.
- Hadfield, Charles (1985). The Canals of the West Midlands. David and Charles. ISBN 0-7153-8644-1.
- Nicholson (2003). Nicholson Guide Vol 3: Birmingham and the Heart of England. Harper Collins. ISBN 0-00-713666-8.
- Pearson, Michael (1989). Canal Companion - Birmingham Canal Navigations. J. M. Pearson & Associates. ISBN 0-907864-49-X.
- Shill, Ray (2002). the Birmingham Canal Navigations. Tempus Publishing. ISBN 978-0-7524-2767-6.

=== References ===
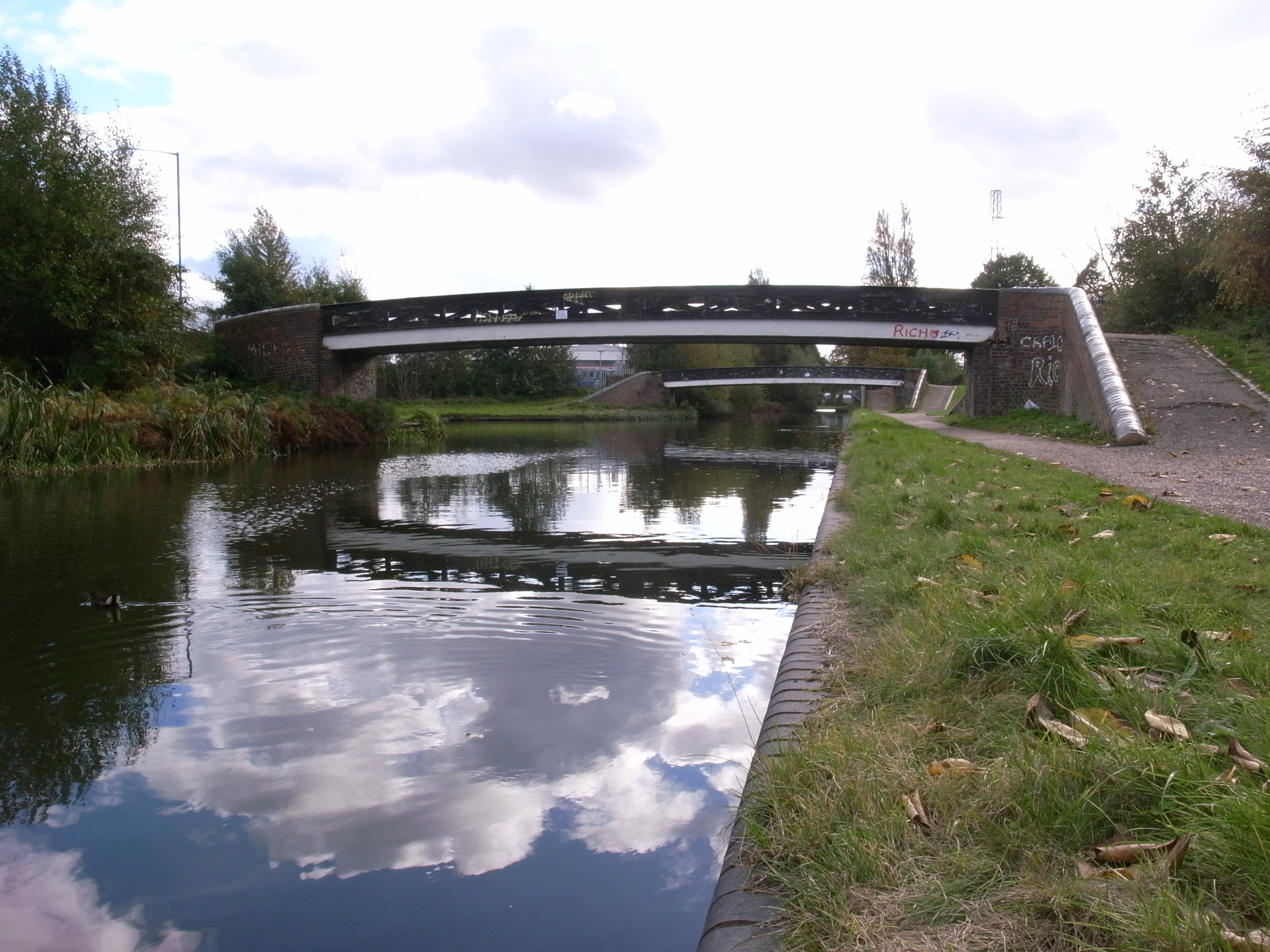
Two identical roving bridges over the Walsall Canal

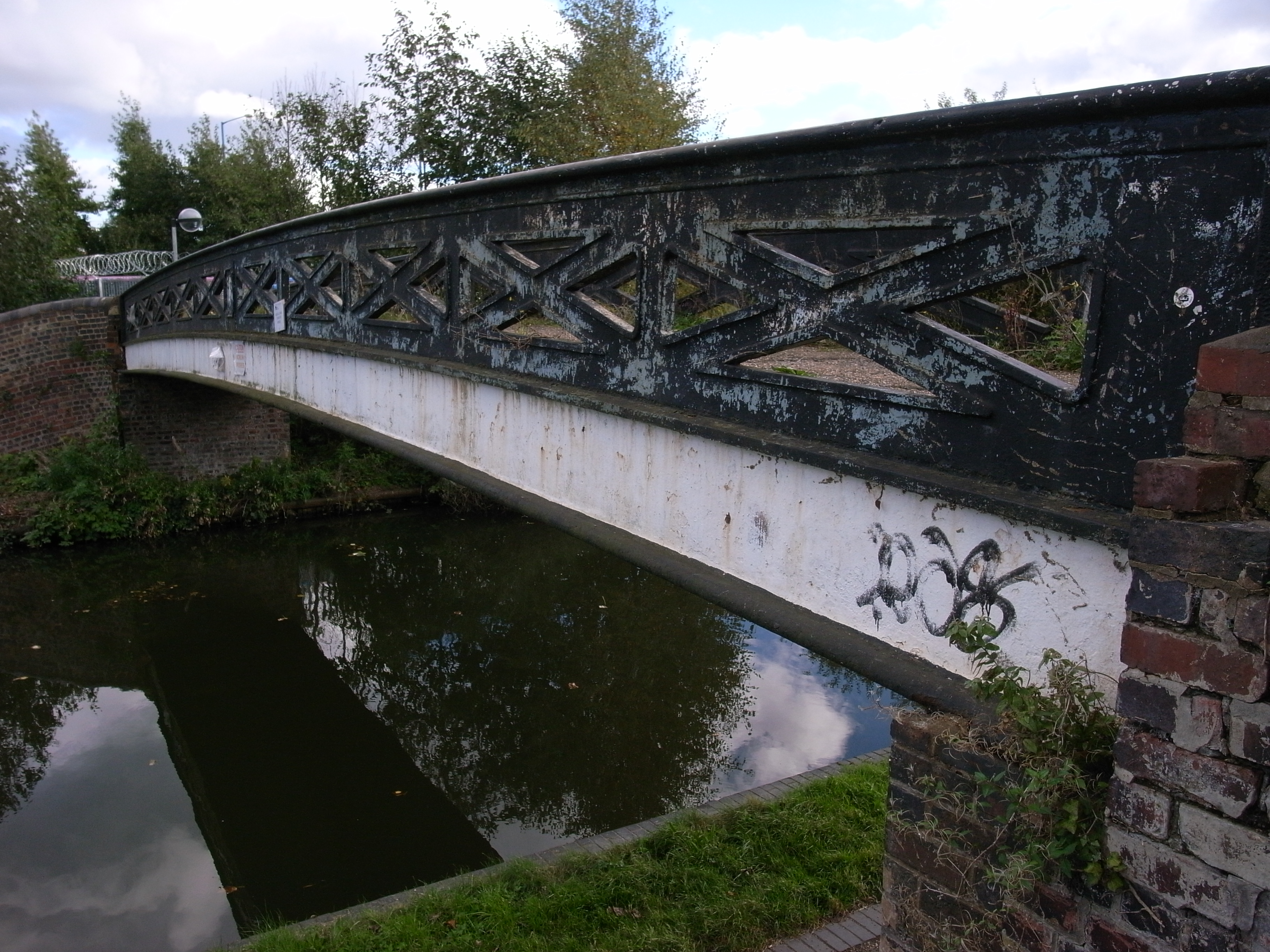
Each parapet is a single casting of iron
