= Spaghetti Junction, Birmingham =

Junction 6 of the M6 motorway, UK

Gravelly Hill Interchange
- Spaghetti Junction
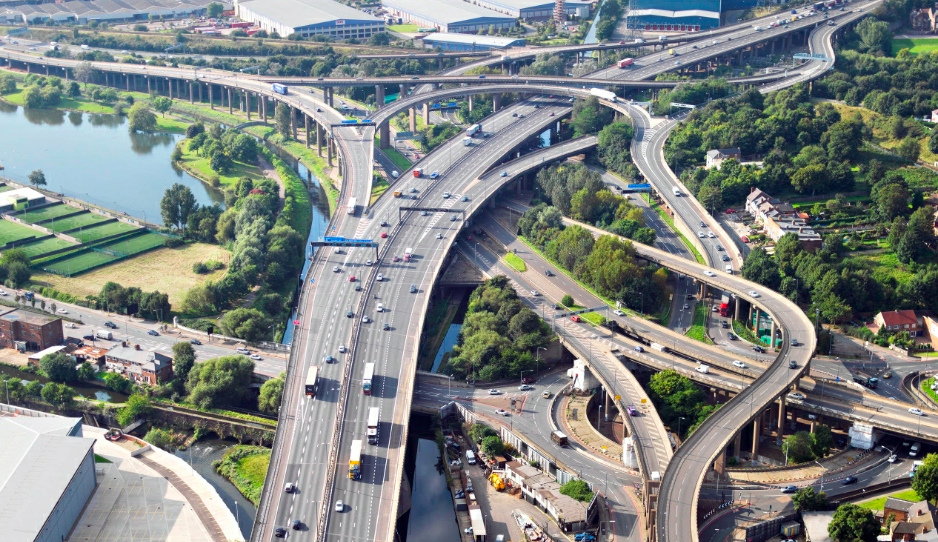
- Gravelly Hill Interchange from the south east
- Interactive map of Gravelly Hill Interchange

Location
- Birmingham, England
- Coordinates: 52.511°N 1.866°W
- Roads at junction: M6; A38(M); A38; A5127

Construction
- Type: Free-flow interchange
- Constructed: by A. Monk Ltd
- Opened: 24 May 1972
- Maintained by: National Highways

Location in the county of West Midlands
Location in UK motorway network

Spaghetti Junction, officially the Gravelly Hill Interchange, is a major road junction in Birmingham, England. It is junction 6 of the M6 motorway where it meets the A38(M) Aston Expressway in the Gravelly Hill area of Birmingham. The interchange was opened on 24 May 1972.

== Background ==
The asymmetrical junction provides access to and from the A38 (Tyburn Road), A38(M) (Aston Expressway), the A5127 (Lichfield Road/Gravelly Hill), and several unclassified local roads. It covers 30 acres (12 ha), serves 18 routes and includes 4 km (2.5 mi) of slip roads, but only 1 km (0.6 mi) of the M6 itself. Across five different levels, it has 559 concrete columns, reaching up to 24.4 m (80 ft). The engineers had to elevate 21.7 km (13.5 mi) of motorway to accommodate two railway lines, three canals and two rivers.

In 1958, the Ministry of Transport commissioned the engineering firm Sir Owen Williams & Partners to investigate possible routes to connect the M6, the A38(M) and the A38 trunk road.

The interchange's colloquial name, "Spaghetti Junction", was coined in 1965 by journalists from the Birmingham Evening Mail. On 1 June 1965, reporter Roy Smith described plans for the then unbuilt junction as a "cross between a plate of spaghetti and an unsuccessful attempt at a Staffordshire knot" and sub-editor Alan Eaglesfield headlined the article "Spaghetti Junction". The name would later be given to other complex road junctions around the world. The student magazine of Birmingham City University, Spaghetti Junction, took its name from the interchange's nickname, before being rebranded as Polygon.

== Construction ==
The development of the interchange was approved and announced in August 1968 by the then Minister of Transport, Richard Marsh. Construction was expected to take three years and to cost £8m. The contract was given to A. Monk Ltd, of Padgate, for £8,183,790 in August 1968. Work started in September 1968 on the 30-acre junction. Monk were also building part of the M3.

The work was led by chief engineer Roy Foot. There were a number of objections and protests over the interchange, particularly a campaign to "save our fish" to relocate a quarter of a million fish from a pool that would be removed as part of the engineering work. One stipulation in construction was that the canal towpaths running underneath the junction need to retain sufficient clearance to allow the passage of horse-drawn narrowboats. Work was mostly complete by May 1970, and attracted attention of local residents. By the following September, several motorists were found to have been driving illegally along it, and children had found it a useful shortcut to school. In early 1972, Viking Motors ran a return service from Burton-on-Trent to the interchange for 65p return.

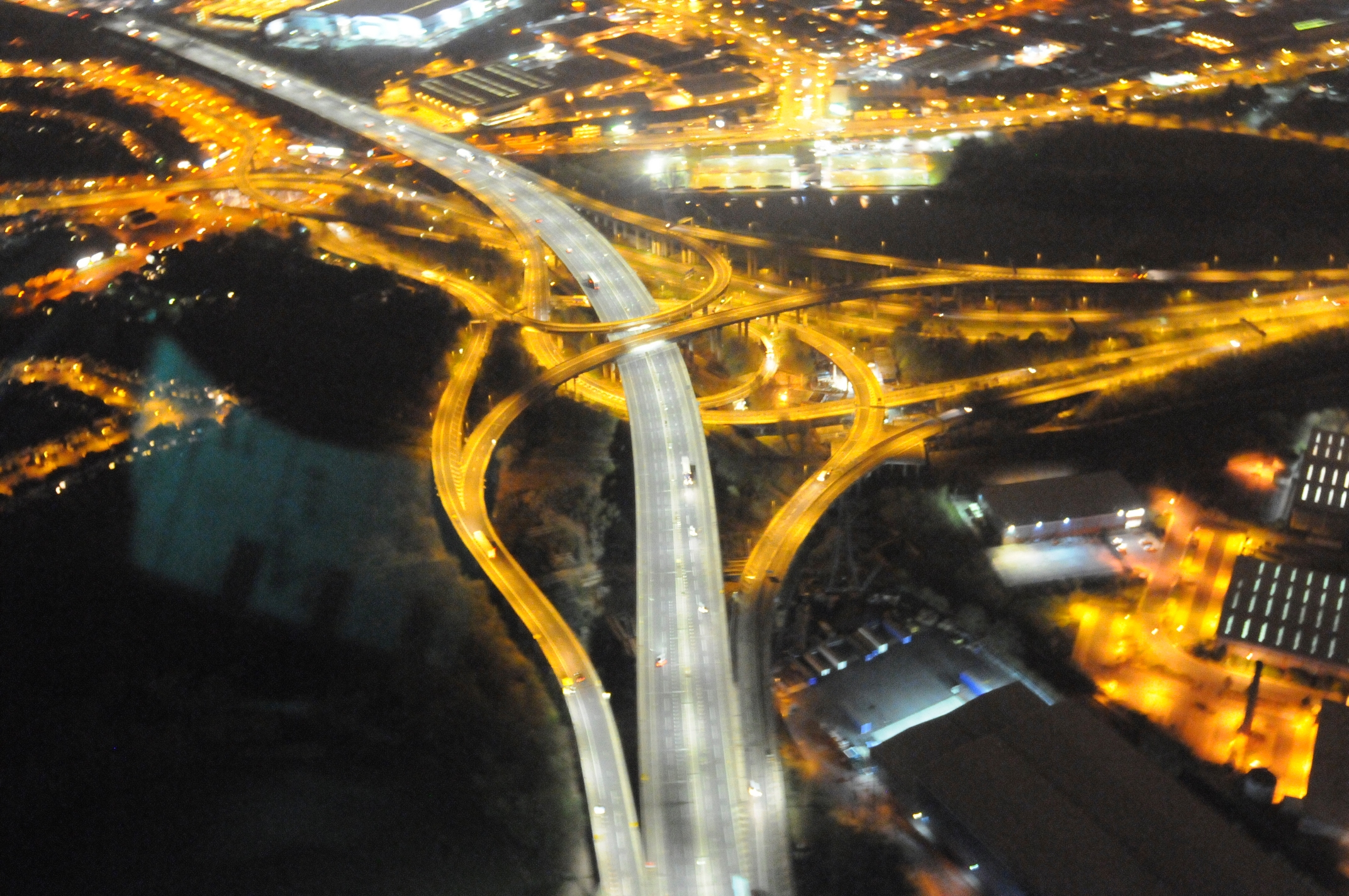
The interchange at night, as seen from a police helicopter

The junction was opened on 24 May 1972 by the then Secretary of State for the Environment, Peter Walker. The opening was delayed by several months because of "box girder inspections". These followed the interim report of the Merrison Enquiry set up following the collapse of similar box girder bridges, the West Gate Bridge in Australia and the Cleddau Bridge in Wales. Birmingham City Council saw the junction as a potential opportunity to attract visitors to the city, and proposed a Grand Prix involving the interchange.

The junction has undergone major repair work several times since, owing to the very heavy traffic through the junction and cost-saving measures during its construction. In November 2007, a slip road running from the Tyburn Road onto the Aston Expressway was closed for urgent repairs. Upon inspection, it was found that Spaghetti Junction itself was in need of repair, because salt and grit had weakened the joints in the structure. By 2009, it was estimated that 1.25 billion vehicles had travelled through the junction, and although structural defects had been found, the overall structure was stable enough to continue carrying traffic.

South-east of the junction, the M6 is on the elevated Bromford Viaduct – the longest viaduct in the UK.

== Co-located junctions ==
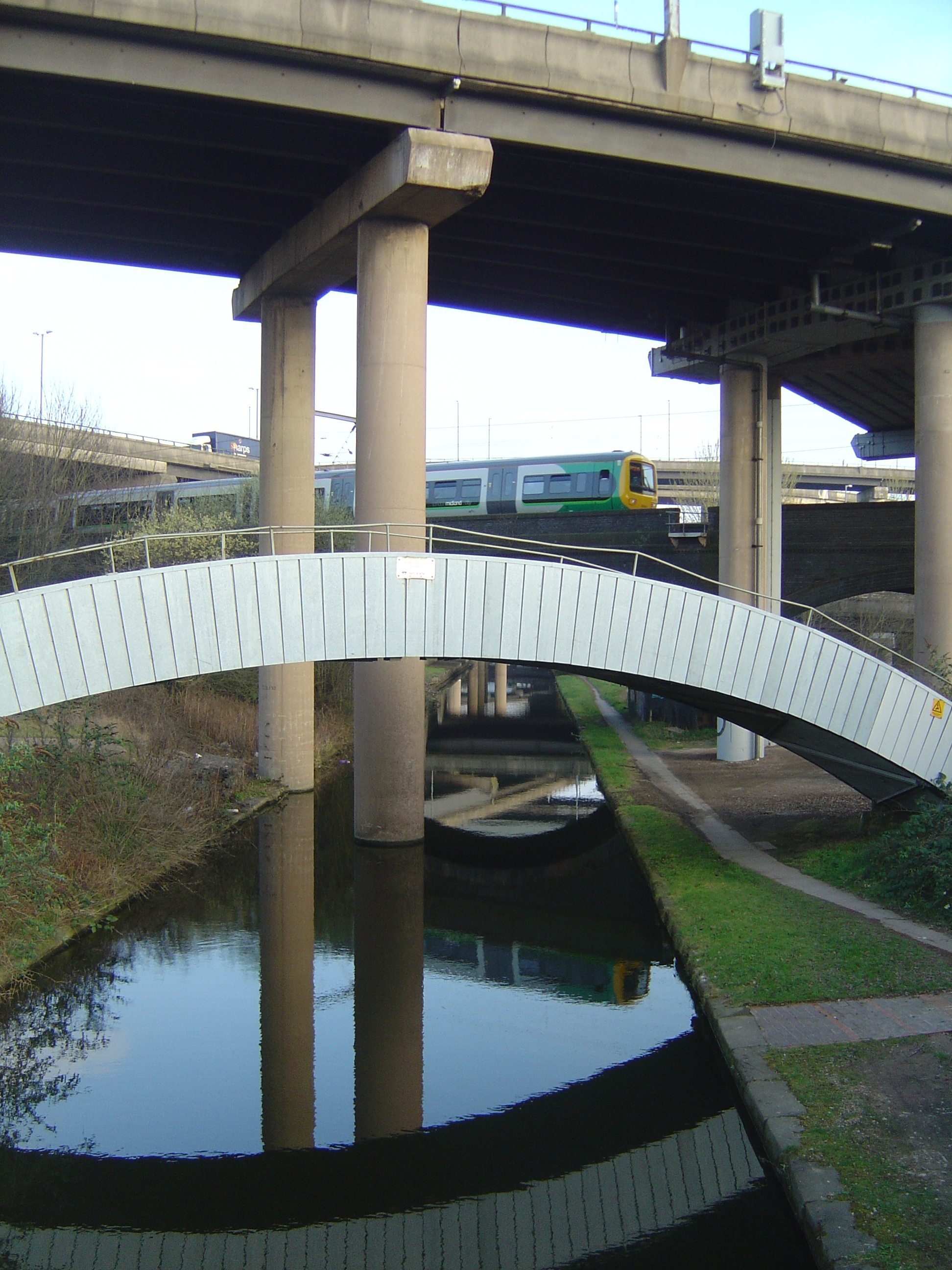
The Cross City Line and Tame Valley Canal passing underneath the motorway complex

Underneath the motorway junction are the meeting points of local roads, the River Tame's confluences with the River Rea and Hockley Brook, the Cross-City and Walsall railway lines and Salford Junction, where the Grand Union Canal, Birmingham and Fazeley Canal and Tame Valley Canal meet.

== Cultural references ==
Gravelly Hill Interchange appears in the 1973 Cliff Richard musical film Take Me High, where he plays a banker living on a barge on Gas Street Basin. Ken Dodd called the junction "the eighth wonder of the world", because "you get on and wonder how to get off".

The National Lottery-based show Winning Lines featured a trip to Spaghetti Junction as a booby prize.

In 2022, for the 50th anniversary of the opening of Spaghetti Junction, Heinz released a limited edition of their tinned spaghetti featuring the interchange on the tin.

The under side of Spaghetti Junction was used for the homeless camp/stacks in Steven Spielberg's 2018 film Ready Player One.

== See also ==
- Transport in Birmingham
- List of road junctions in the United Kingdom
- Other Spaghetti Junctions
- Worsley Braided Interchange
