= Hockley Brook =

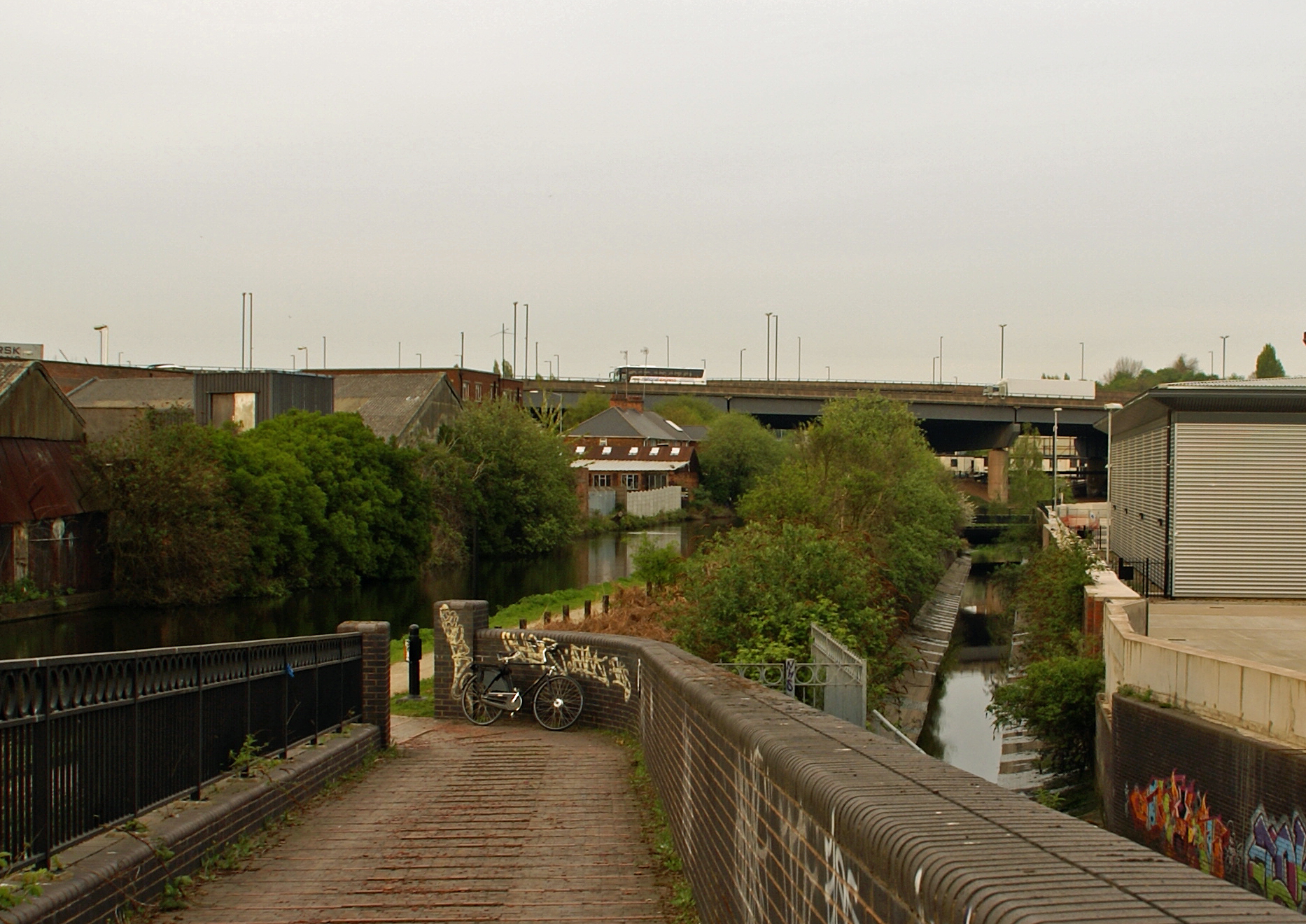
- The brook (right) near its end, with the Birmingham & Fazeley canal alongside.
- Etymology: Hockley/ Aston

Location
- Country: England
- Region: Birmingham

Physical characteristics
- Mouth
  - location: River Tame

Basin features
- Progression: Trent - Humber - North Sea
- Tributaries
  - right: Boundary Brook (at Black Patch Park)

Hockley Brook is a brook, or stream, in north Birmingham, England. It rises just outside the city, in Smethwick, and runs through Black Patch Park and then through the city's Soho, Hockley and Aston districts, to its confluence with the River Tame, beneath Gravelly Hill Interchange. From there, its waters flow, via the Trent, to the Humber Estuary and the North Sea. At the eastern end, it is known as Aston Brook, giving its name to Aston Brook Street.

It previously marked the boundary between Birmingham (then Warwickshire) and Smethwick (then Staffordshire); between the then Staffordshire country villages of Handsworth and Smethwick; and between Birmingham and Aston, before the city absorbed the latter district.

The brook once fed several mills and provided water for Matthew Boulton's Soho Manufactory.

In post-World War II years, it was culverted (buried in pipes) for much of its length.

Local historian and artist Ron "Smudge" Smith titled his 1998 autobiography A Paddle in Hockley Brook.

== Features ==
Point	Coordinates (links to map & photo sources)	Notes
Source	52.496614°N 1.944522°W	
Start of main underground section	52.496046°N 1.919417°W	
End of main underground section	52.499775°N 1.872478°W	
Confluence with River Tame	52.508184°N 1.860258°W	
