= Warwick Bar =

Conservation area in Birmingham, England

Coordinates: 52.47985°N 1.88338°W

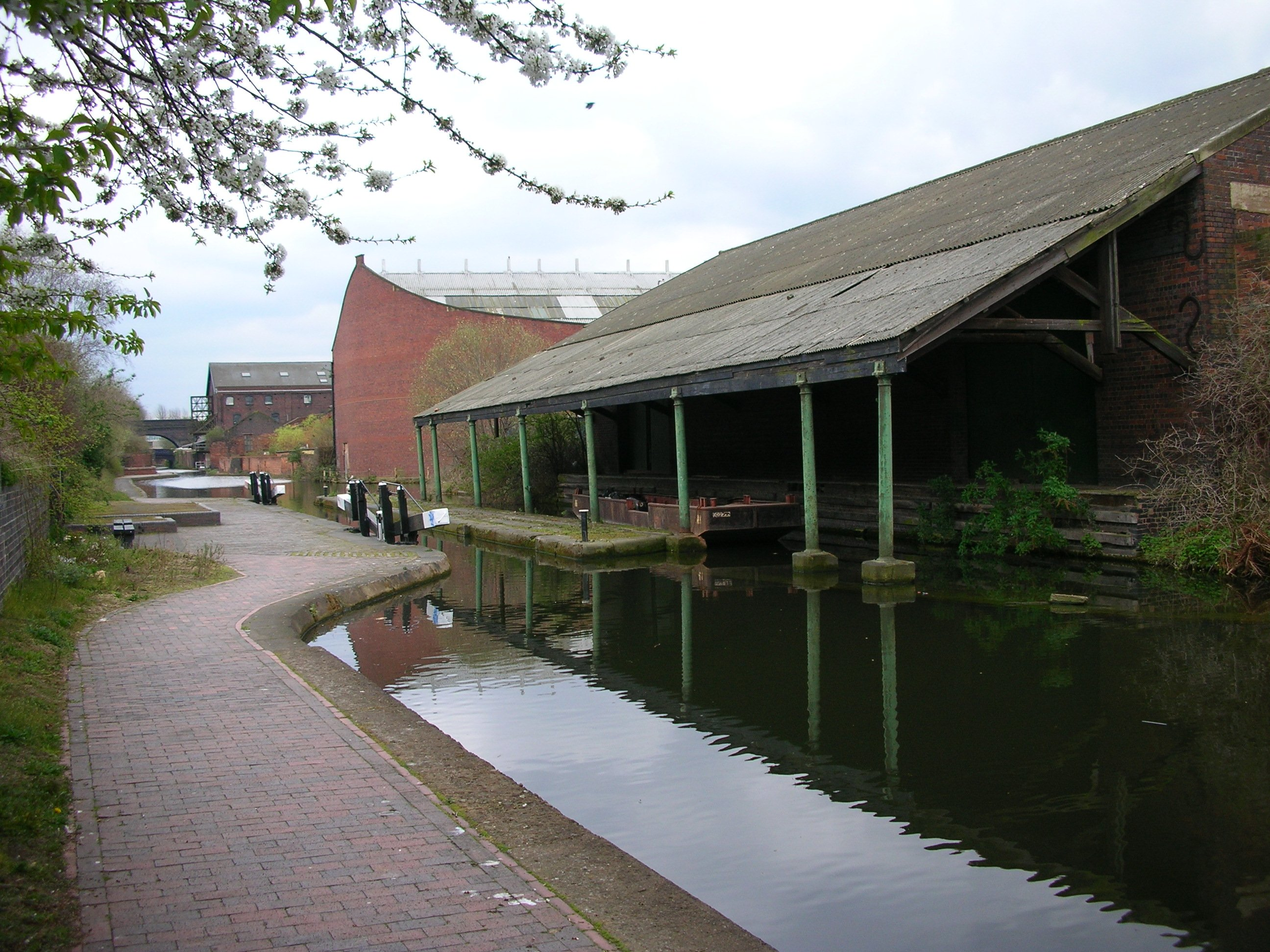
The Warwick Bar stop lock and Banana Warehouse

The Warwick Bar conservation area is a conservation area in Birmingham, England which was home to many canalside factories during the Industrial Revolution of the eighteenth and nineteenth centuries.

It is named after the Warwick Bar and later Warwick Bar stop lock at the junction of the Digbeth Branch of the Birmingham Canal Navigations and the Warwick and Birmingham Canal (later the Grand Union Canal).

== Warwick Bar Conservation Area ==
Warwick Bar Conservation Area covers an area of 16.2 hectares (40 acres) where the Birmingham-to-London Grand Union Canal meets the Digbeth Branch Canal. It was designated such status on 25 June 1987. It covers the entire length of the Digbeth Branch Canal through the Eastside area and a section of the River Rea. To the south is the Digbeth, Deritend and Bordesley High Streets Conservation Area.

The conservation area includes three of the statutorily listed buildings in Birmingham, each built by the canal company in the 1840s and 1850s, and a locally listed canal warehouse built in 1935. In total, there are five listed buildings and six locally listed buildings. One locally listed building, the former Co-op furniture factory works (1899) on Belmont Row was destroyed by fire on 11 January 2007 in a suspected arson attack. Seventy-five percent of the building was damaged by a fire which caused the roof to collapse and which also destroyed seven arched windows. On 18 January 2007, the façade of the building, which had survived the fire albeit smoke damaged, collapsed in on itself in high winds owing to the lack of support it received after the fire had been put out. This building had been due to be redeveloped as part of the Ventureast regeneration project.

== Redevelopment ==
An area covering 1.9 hectares (4.56 acres) of the conservation area began a redevelopment during 2005 as part of the Birmingham Eastside development which saw the renovation of dilapidated buildings.

The site has been earmarked by developers as a key site for a super casino in Birmingham, by 2020. The developers have been in extended talks with the Birmingham City Council, and in 2013 gave their initial approval for the plans for the super casino and hotel on the Warwick bar site. This decision was taken in conjunction with the anticipated impacts of the new HS2 route into the city. The conversion of listed buildings on the site to the new casino and hotel have been endorsed by English Heritage, based on the special consideration of the economic benefits for the area of DigbethDigbeth.

Many proposed projects for the area have been submitted including one named "The Needle" which has had very little information presented about it. The developments are mainly residential and will replace or regenerate the old warehouse buildings. Designs for buildings and a masterplan were submitted at an international design competition organised by Midlands Architecture & the Designed Environment (MADE) in summer 2005. A total of 45 companies submitted masterplans for the development which was cut down to a shortlist of seven; AZHAR architecture, DSDHA, FAT, S333, Kinetic AIU, Jeppe Aagaard Andersen, and Sarah Wiglesworth. The winners were chosen as Kinetic AIU, who were awarded the title by ISIS and Birmingham City Council. The three groups worked together to produce a masterplan which is yet to be submitted for planning permission to Birmingham City Council. The proposals include a film centre, art gallery, hotel and social areas. Around 600 new homes are to be constructed in the area. The £100 million project is due to be completed by 2013. The development includes the renovation of the locally listed Fellows Morton & Clayton building and the Banana Warehouse.

A separate redevelopment scheme in the Warwick Bar conservation area is The Bond which transformed a complex of Victorian factory buildings fronting onto the Grand Union Canal into an office and media complex. The centrepiece of this complex is The Ice House, which was constructed in 1890 for the production of ice. The ammonia compressor was built for W. Tansley, and could produce 40 tons of ice in 26 hours which would then be used in the markets. This and the surrounding canal buildings are locally listed. Companies and organisations based at The Bond complex include the World Wildlife Fund.

== Warwick Bar stop lock ==
The Warwick Bar was a physical gap between the Warwick and Birmingham Canal (now part of the Grand Union Canal) and the Digbeth Branch of the Birmingham and Fazeley Canal. The two canals were built by different companies, and goods had initially to be transshipped between boats on the two sides of the bar. Later, the companies agreed to build a stop lock, to avoid either company drawing on the precious water resources of the other.

Here the stop lock consists of two opposing lock gates at each end of a lock so that a boat could move from one canal to the other with a minuscule amount of water loss, and no water flow, no matter which canal happened to be the higher at any particular time. Today the gates are chained open as the two canals are under common control.

The adjacent Banana Warehouse with its overhanging canopy is so named as it was once owned by Geest. Both are grade II listed.

The towpath can be accessed from the bridge at Great Barr Street and where Fazeley Street crosses the Typhoo Branch.

== Listed structures ==
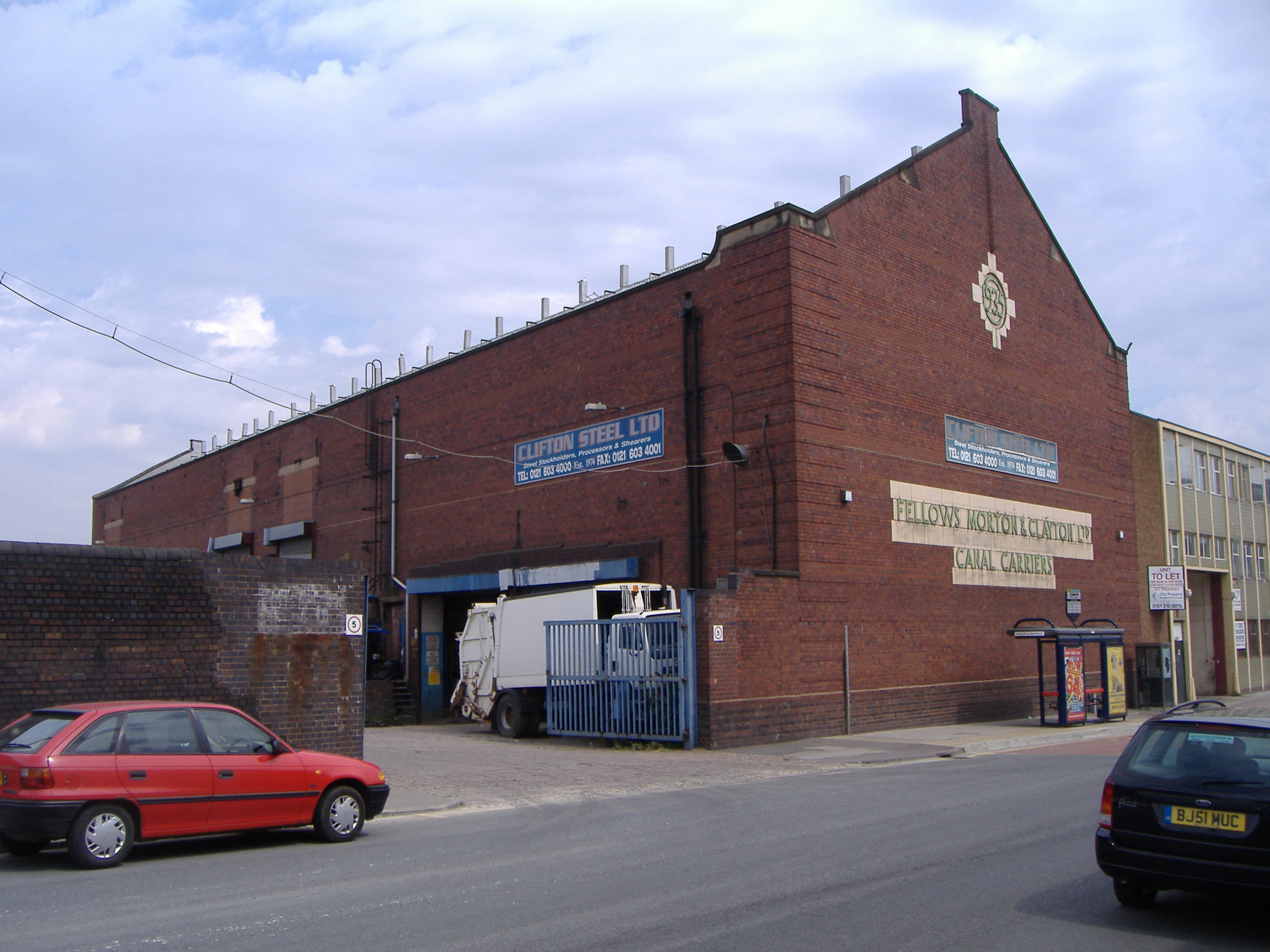
The former 1935 Fellows Morton & Clayton building

- Historic England. "Warwick Bar stop lock and Banana Warehouse – Grade II (1075624)". National Heritage List for England.
- Historic England. "Birmingham Gun Barrel Proof House – Grade II (1291262)". National Heritage List for England.
- Historic England. "106–110 Fazeley Street, warehouses – Grade II (1210764)". National Heritage List for England.
- Historic England. "122 Fazeley Street, warehouse – Grade II (1075625)". National Heritage List for England.
- Locally listed – former 1935 Fellows Morton & Clayton building – Grade C
- Locally listed – 180–182 Fazeley Street – Grade B
- Locally listed – former Bond warehouse – Grade A
- Locally listed – Grand Union Canal aqueduct over River Rea – Grade B
- Locally listed – part of River Rea – Grade C

== See also ==
- Worcester Bar
- List of conservation areas in the West Midlands
