= Bordesley Junction =

Canal junction in Bordesley, Birmingham, England

Coordinates: 52°28′32″N 1°52′38″W

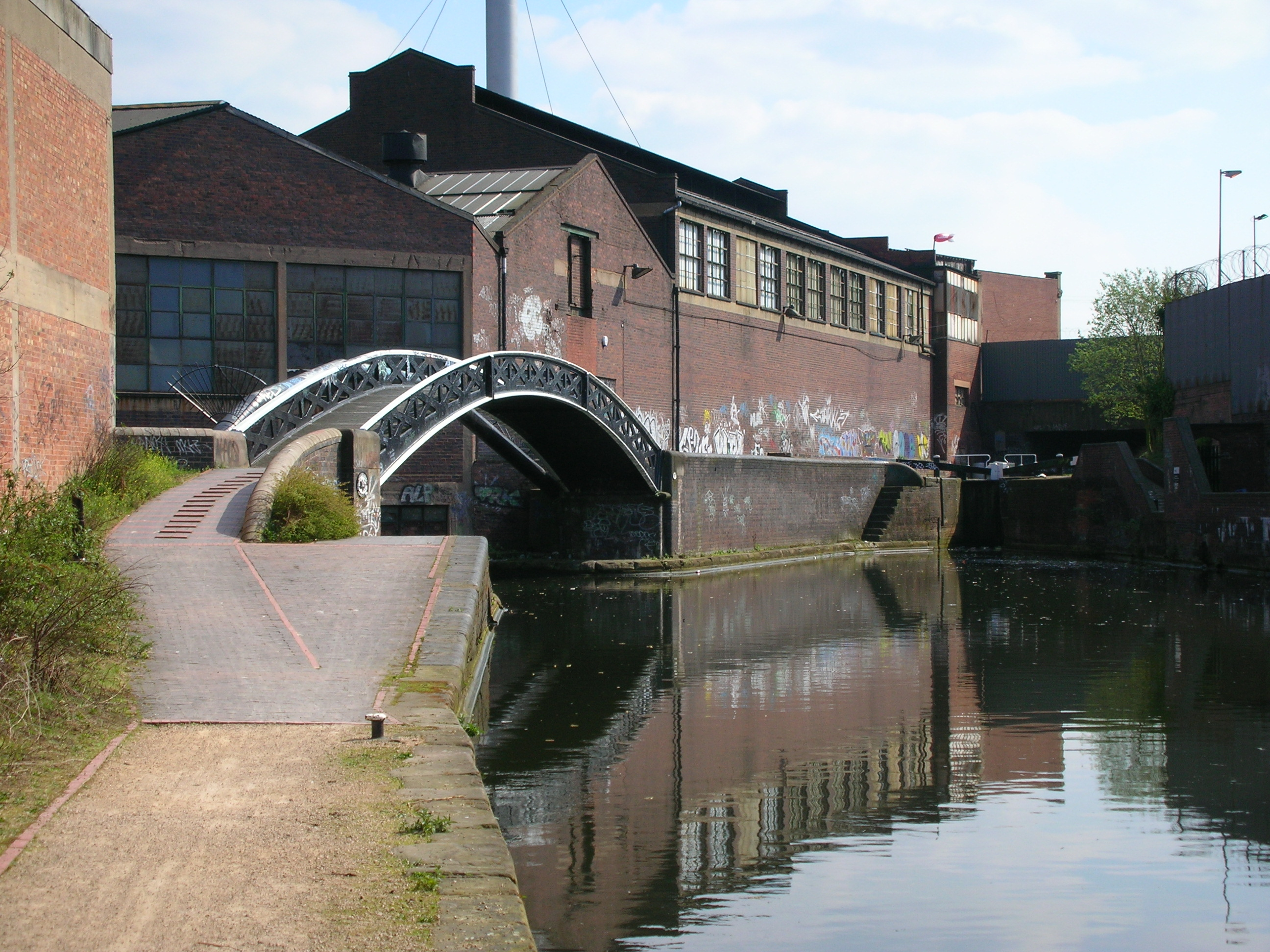
- The main line to Warwick through Camp Hill Locks is straight ahead. The bypass to Salford Junction turns under the towpath bridge.

Specifications
- Status: Open
- Navigation authority: Canal & River Trust

History
- Date completed: 1844

Bordesley Junction (grid reference SP084864) is a canal junction where the Grand Union Canal splits near to Bordesley, Birmingham, England. It opened in 1844, when the Birmingham and Warwick Junction Canal was built as part of a scheme to bypass the congestion at the Farmers Bridge flight of locks.

== History ==
The Grand Union Canal was formed in 1929 by the amalgamation of eight canal companies. The route through Bordesley was part of the Warwick and Birmingham Canal, which intersected the Digbeth Branch of the Birmingham Canal Navigations a short distance to the north-west of the junction. The canal was authorised by an act of Parliament obtained in 1793, and officially opened on 19 December 1799, as did the Warwick and Napton Canal – the continuation from its southern end running southeast to Napton Junction on the Oxford Canal. Apparently having had a three-month testing phase, commercial through traffic began on 19 March 1800. The Digbeth Branch was built in 1799 under powers in the Birmingham Canal Navigation Act 1768 (8 Geo. 3. c. 38).

Congestion on the Farmer's Bridge flight of locks had been a problem since 1793, and had been compounded by the opening of the Warwick and Birmingham Canal, which provided the main link between the Birmingham canals and London. Improvements completed in 1829 to the Birmingham Canal's main line and the opening of the Birmingham and Liverpool Junction Canal in 1835, which brought traffic into the area from and bound for the north west, meant a solution to the congestion was urgently required, and an act of Parliament was obtained in 1839 to authorise the Tame Valley Canal. At the same time, the idea of a line from Salford Junction, Erdington/Nechells, Aston to Camp Hill Locks, which had been proposed in 1830, was revived. The Tame Valley obtained a second act of Parliament, and the Birmingham and Warwick Junction Canal obtained its act of Parliament on the same day in 1840. Six locks (including a stop lock) were built between Salford Junction and a new junction, Bordesley Junction, at Bordesley, a similar relatively close distance to Birmingham, and the canal and junction opened on 14 February 1844, as did the Tame Valley Canal.

== Location ==
The southern arm is the main line of the Grand Union to London. It ascends through the six Camp Hill Locks, to reach a 10.4-mile (16.7 km) summit level, which ends at the five Knowle Locks. The locks at Knowle, unlike those at Camp Hill, are wide, having been widened in the 1930s to take 14-foot (4.3 m) barges which could carry 70 tons. The north-east arm was originally the Birmingham and Warwick Junction Canal leading to Salford Junction and on to the north east and north west of the country. It descends through the five Garrison Locks, and is 2.6 miles (4.2 km) long. The short north-west arm led to the Warwick Bar stoplock, close to Digbeth (or Proof House) Junction and the Digbeth Branch Canal of the Birmingham Canal Navigations, and on to Gas Street Basin for the main Birmingham wharfs and onward to the Severn via the Worcester and Birmingham Canal.

== See also ==
- Canals of the United Kingdom
- History of the British canal system

== Bibliography ==
- Cumberlidge, Jane (2009). Inland Waterways of Great Britain (8th Ed.). Imray Laurie Norie and Wilson. ISBN 978-1-84623-010-3.
- Hadfield, Charles (1970). The Canals of the East Midlands. David and Charles. ISBN 0-7153-4871-X.
- Hadfield, Charles (1985). The Canals of the West Midlands. David and Charles. ISBN 0-7153-8644-1.
- Nicholson (2003). Nicholson Guide Vol 3: Birmingham and the Heart of England. Harper Collins.
- Pearson, Michael (1989). Canal Companion – Birmingham Canal Navigations. J. M. Pearson & Associates. ISBN 0-907864-49-X.
