= River Rea =

Rea
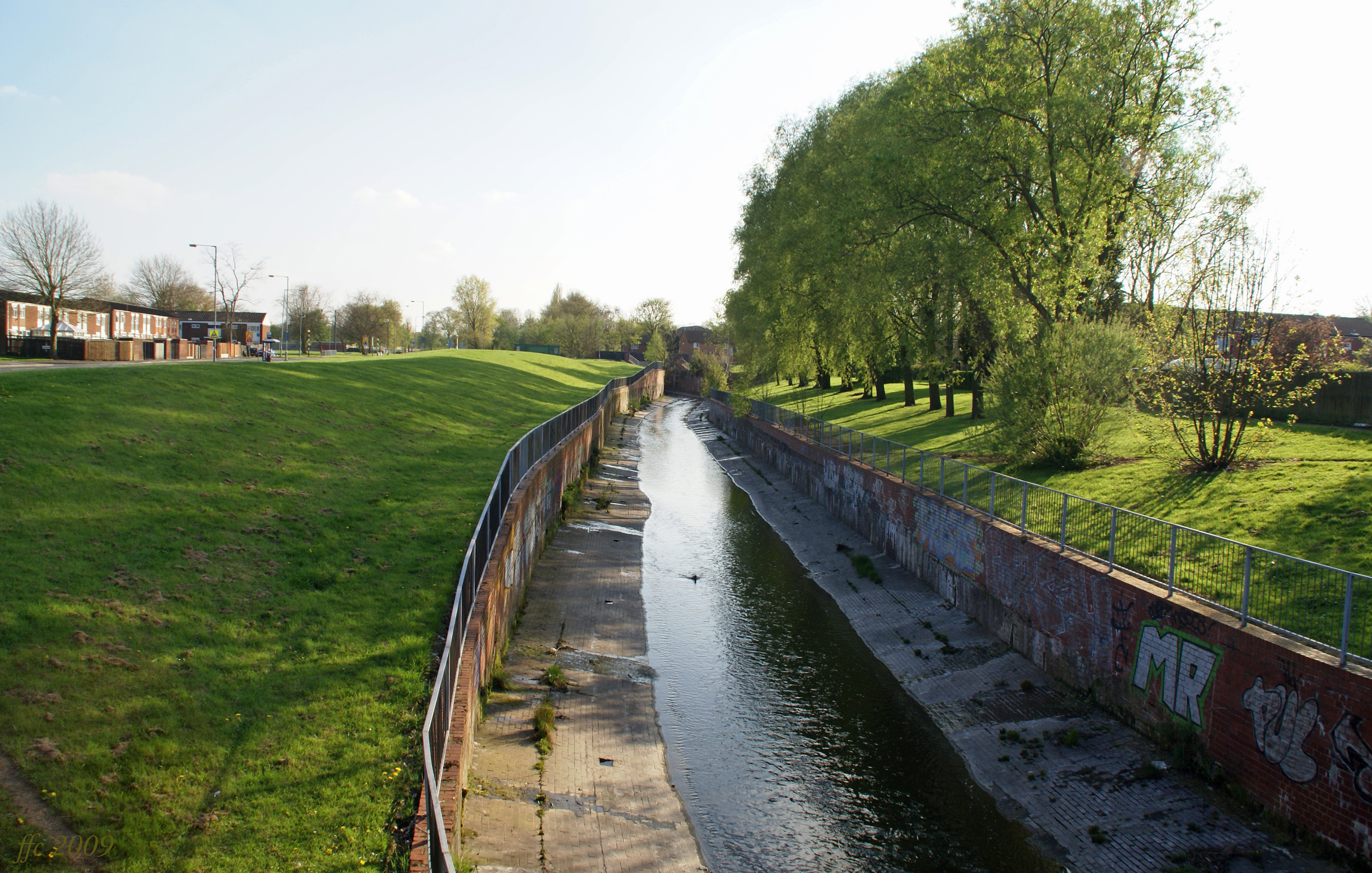
- The River Rea at Belgrave Middleway (Birmingham)
- Etymology: "to flow" (Old English)

Location
- Country: England

Physical characteristics
- Source
  - location: Waseley Hills Country Park, Worcestershire
- Mouth
  - location: Confluence with the Tame
  - coordinates: 52°30′15″N 1°50′37″W
- Length: 14 mi (23 km)

Basin features
- Progression: Rea → Tame → Trent → Humber → North Sea

The River Rea (/ˈreɪ/ RAY) is a small river which passes through Birmingham, England. It is the river on which Birmingham was founded by the Beorma tribe in the 7th century.

== Name ==
The name of the Rea derives from a root found in many Indo-European languages and means "to run" or "to flow".

== Course ==
The Rea rises in Waseley Hills Country Park, with the source well signposted from the car park there. The river drops about 70 metres (230 ft) in its first mile, but from then on has a very gentle slope. The river's tributaries include Callow Brook, the Bourne (which begins as Merritts Brook before joining Griffins Brook) and Bourne Brook. From Rubery, the river flows into Birmingham near the former Rover works at Longbridge, then flows through a tunnel under the A38. In Northfield, one of the river's few remaining fords is at The Mill Walk, near Hawkesley Mill Lane. After this, the river valley is also used by the railway to Kings Norton.

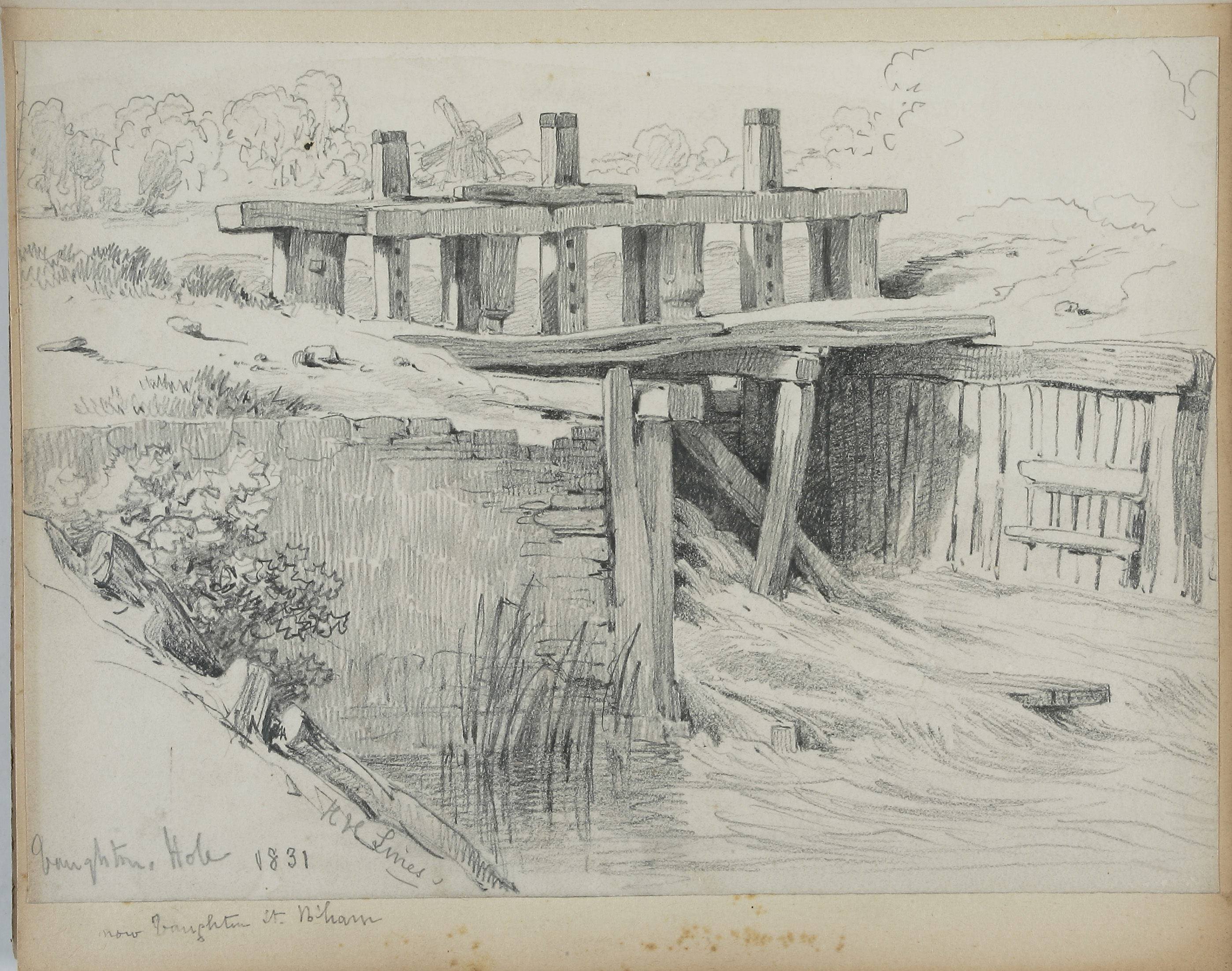
A floodgate on the river at Vaughton's Hole (now Vaughton St), Highgate, Birmingham, drawn in 1831 by Henry Harris Lines

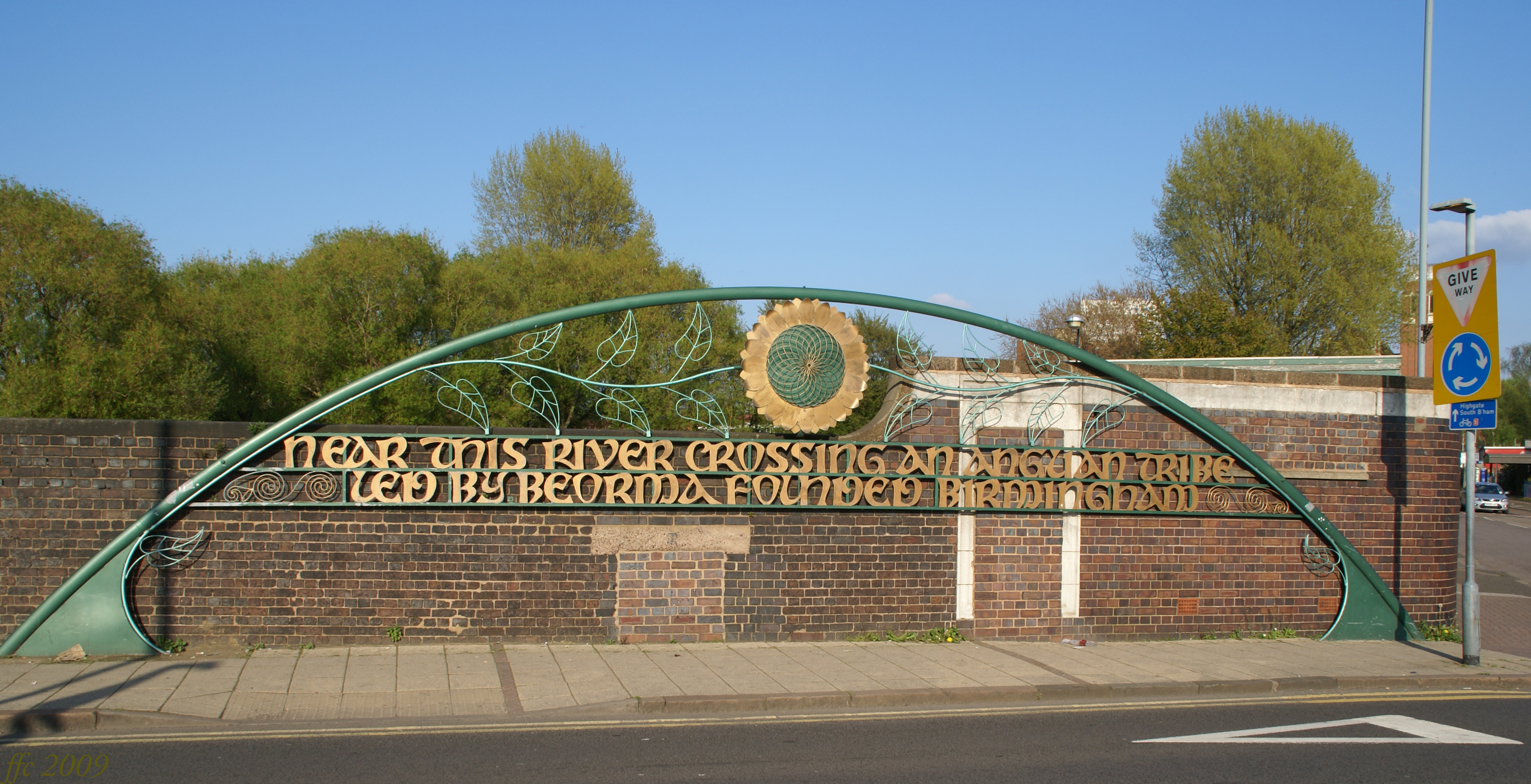
One of the Gooch Street Bridge arches

Wychall Reservoir, near the river at Kings Norton, was built in the early 19th century by the Worcester Canal Company after mill owners claimed that water was being taken from the river to fill the canal and reducing the working effectiveness of their mills. Following Kings Norton, the river flows through Stirchley. It is now culverted for much of its course through Birmingham, during which it passes through the Pebble Mill area and Cannon Hill Park then Calthorpe Park. A pair of decorative arches on the bridge where Gooch Street crosses the river mark the first settlement of Birmingham. The medieval hamlet of Birmingham was built on a crossing on the Rea in what is now Digbeth. Many of the street names in the area refer to the river or its mills. These include Rea Street, Floodgate Street, River Street and Duddeston Mill Road. There are proposals to include a riverside walk and new bridge over the Rea at Digbeth's Custard Factory media and arts complex (now complete). There are also proposals for the river to be uncovered at the Warwick Bar area of Digbeth.

Near Gravelly Hill Interchange, about 14 miles (23 kilometres) from its source, the Rea merges with the River Tame, with its waters eventually reaching the North Sea via the Trent and the Humber Estuary.

== Flood prevention measures ==
The Rea frequently bursts its banks after heavy rain. A £2.7 million scheme to reduce the risk of flooding to more than 200 homes and businesses in the south of Selly Park was completed in January 2018.

== See also ==
- Rivers of the United Kingdom
