= Tame Valley Canal =

Canal in the West Midlands, England

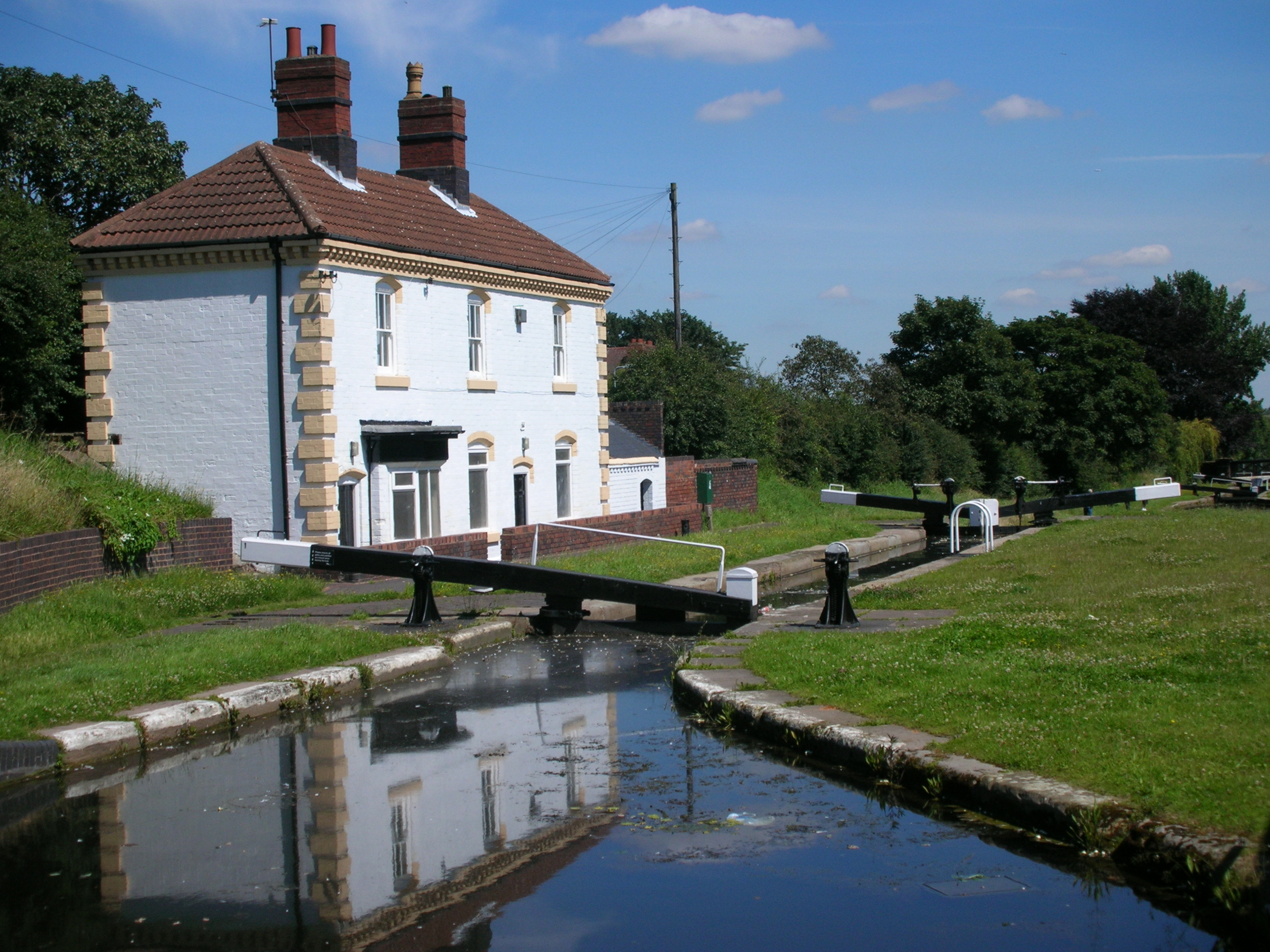
- Perry Barr top lock and keepers cottage No 86, seen in 2007
- Interactive map of Tame Valley Canal

Specifications
- Length: 8.5 miles (13.7 km)
- Status: Navigable

History
- Date of act: 1839

Geography
- Connects to: Walsall Canal; Birmingham and Fazeley Canal

The Tame Valley Canal is a relatively late canal in the West Midlands of England. It forms part of the Birmingham Canal Navigations, and opened in 1844. It was conceived as a northern bypass for the Birmingham Canal Navigations, to relieve pressure on the congested Farmers Bridge lock flight. It connects the Walsall Canal at its western end to the Birmingham and Fazeley Canal at its eastern end. It takes its name from the roughly-parallel River Tame.

Much of it is at the Birmingham Canal Navigations' Walsall Level, following the 408-foot (124 m) contour. At its eastern end, a flight of 13 locks lowers the level of the canal by 106 feet (32 m). It is crossed by a large number of bridges, many of which date from the construction of the canal, and are grade II listed. There are eight aqueducts, seven of which are original, while the eighth crosses the connecting road between the M5 and M6 motorways. The eastern end is dwarfed by a maze of motorway viaducts, which form the Gravelly Hill Interchange, known to many as Spaghetti Junction.

== Geography ==
The canal runs from Tame Valley Junction in the west where it joins the Walsall Canal near Ocker Hill and Toll End, and terminates at Salford Junction in the east where it meets the Birmingham & Fazeley Canal and the Grand Union Canal. It is 8.7 miles (14.0 km) long, has twin towpaths throughout, and descends through 13 locks as it heads eastwards.

At Tame Valley Junction, the towpath on the Walsall Canal is on its west bank. Two similar bridges carry the Tame Valley towpaths across the Walsall Canal. They are of cast iron, with brick abutments. The sides of the central arch are pierced to form saltire crosses. Both bridges are grade II listed structures. A bridge carries the A41 Black Country New Road over the canal almost immediately, and an aqueduct carries the canal over the River Tame. The Danks Branch of the Walsall Canal, which was going to be the end of the canal when it was first planned, was on the south bank of the revised route, just before Golds Hill Bridge. This is near to the railway bridge for the closed South Staffordshire line. Jones Bridge near Wednesbury is close to the former Birmingham, Wolverhampton and Dudley Railway bridge, which has been reused by the West Midlands Metro. The A4196 Holloway Bank road crosses at Holloway Bank Bridge.

The minor Balls Hill Bridge is followed by Hateley Heath Aqueduct, a cast iron trough supported on girders. The abutments are built of brick, and iron railings form the parapets. It carries the canal over Hydes Road. The next crossings are Crankhall Lane Bridge at Hall Green, Friar Park Farm Bridge and Walsall Road Bridge, which carries the A4013 road. This is followed by four more aqueducts. The first is Walsall Road Aqueduct, crossing a minor road, and consisting of a cast iron trough supported by iron girders. The side panels are bolted together, and further iron girders support the towpaths on either side. The second crosses the Chase Line, originally the Grand Junction Railway which opened between Birmingham and Warrington in 1837. Its three arches are constructed of brick, with sandstone dressings. Tame Bridge Parkway railway station is just to the north, but is much newer, as it opened in 1990. The third aqueduct is also relatively new, as it carries the canal over the M5 motorway as it joins the M6 northbound. The fourth crosses the River Tame, immeditately to the west of a large sewage treatment works, which is situated next to the south bank of the canal. Rushall Junction, where the Rushall Canal heads northwards is overshadowed by the M5 sliproads where they join the M6 southbound.

Just to the west of the sliproads is Brickfield Bridge, another cast iron bridge with brick abutments and saltire crosses, dating from 1844. Brickfields turnover bridge is of similar construction. It originally was a road bridge, but is now a footbridge. It is followed by a deep cutting with the modern high-level Scott Bridge crossing it. The road is now the A4041, and the crossing was labelled as a viaduct in 1904. Chimney Bridge is a footbridge, carried over the canal on large brick pillars. At Hamstead the remains of a wharf can be seen. There was a basin to the south of the canal, and a tramway connected it to the former Hamstead Colliery. Gorse Farm Bridge was immediately to the west of the basin. It is a cast iron girder bridge, with pierced iron parapets forming a pattern of St. Andrews crosses. Historic England call it Gerse Farm Bridge, although it was historically called Gorse Farm Bridge.

Further east, there are two more aqueducts. Sprouthouse Lane aqueduct is made of rock faced sandstone and brick, with a round arch over the road. Piercy Aqueduct crosses over the Old Walsall Road. There is a deep cutting in 200-million-year-old sandstone, crossed by the single brick arch of Freeth Bridge (now restricted to pedestrians and bikes only) at Tower Hill. The final bridge on the 5.7-mile (9.2 km) level section from Tame Valley Junction carries the A34 Walsall Road. There are no locks on this section, which is at the Birmingham Canal Navigations Walsall Level of 408 feet (124 m) above Ordnance datum.

The thirteen Perry Barr Locks, which drop the level of the canal by 106 feet (32 m), start just beyond the A34. There is an original lock keepers cottage with an attached office on the north bank at lock 1. Below lock 2 the canal is crossed by Perry Barr Locks Bridge, a cast iron girder bridge with pierced parapets in the shape of St. Andrews crosses, supported by brick pillars. In the adjacent Perry Park, after lock 7 and near Alexander Stadium, is Perry Reservoir (Note: Not to be confused with Perry Barr Reservoir, nor with Perry Hall Playing Fields Flood Detention Reservoir in Perry Park.), a 27,300 m^{3} (35,700 cu yd) feeder reservoir completed in 1880 and fed by Holbrook, a tributary of the Tame that rises near Barr Beacon. From there, the canal passes under the M6 and Aldridge Road Bridge. Locks 8, 9 and 10 are close together before the A453 Cottage Road Bridge crosses, with lock 11 to the east of it.

Moor Lane Bridge is a footbridge, which is followed by Perrywell Road Bridge. The M6 motorway crosses back over the canal and then it is crossed by Brookvale Road Bridge, carrying the A4040. There is another lock keeper's cottage at lock 12 Below the lock is Deykins Avenue Bridge, a cast iron bridge probably manufactured by Horseley Ironworks. Lock 13 completes the descent, and follows the bridge. Witton turnover bridge is a cast iron roving bridge manufactured by Horseley Ironworks, and crosses the canal just before it enters a maze of motorway flyovers that form the Gravelly Hill Interchange, known to many as Spaghetti Junction. Salford Junction, where the canal joins the Wyrley and Essington Canal, is also dwarfed by the motorway bridges overhead.

== History ==
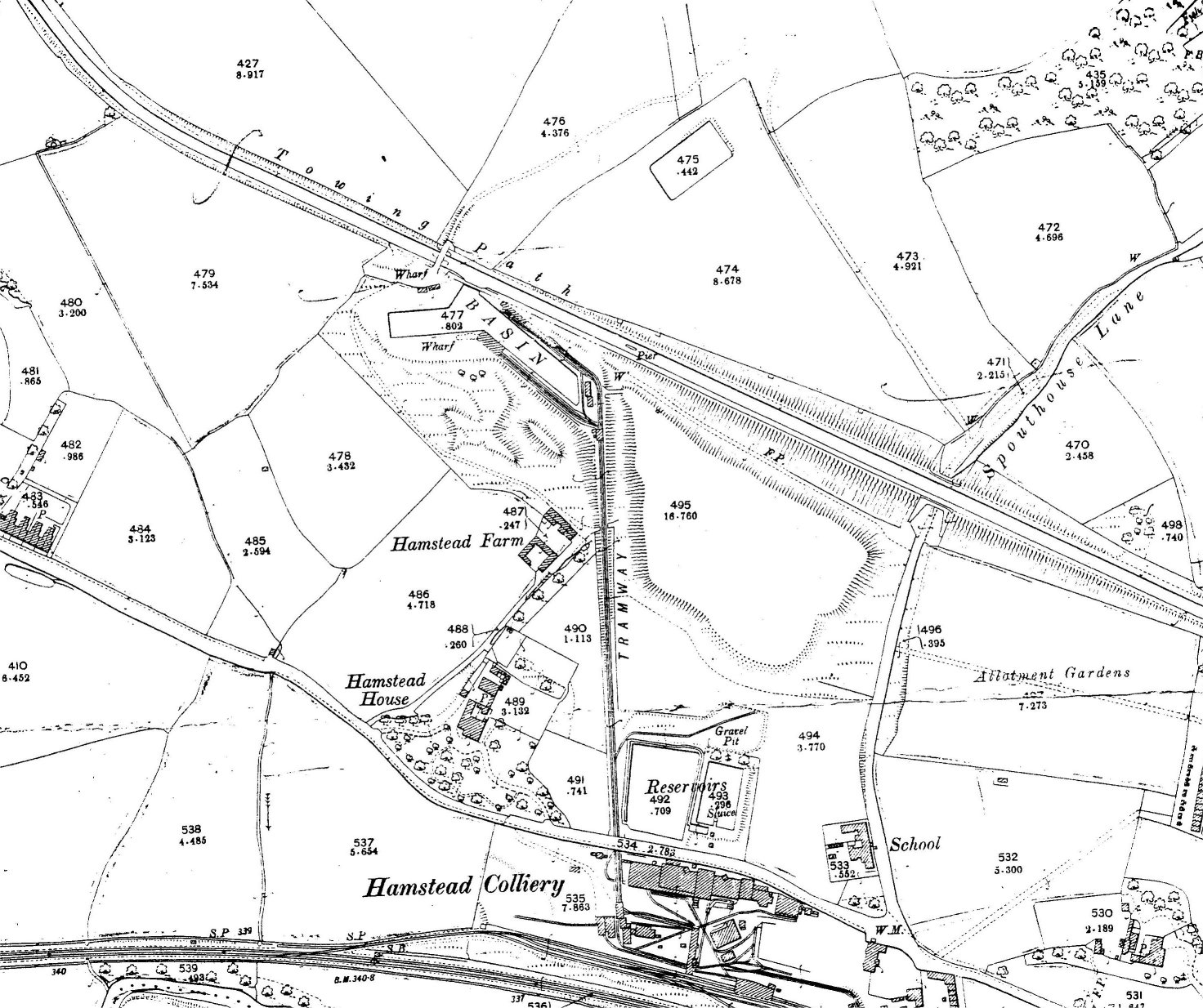
1901 map showing the former canal basin at Hamstead

The Birmingham Canal Navigations had started life as the Birmingham Canal, a winding contour canal that ran from Aldersley Junction in Wolverhampton to Old Turn Junction in Birmingham. As the network had grown, there was a need to improve it, and the engineer Thomas Telford was asked to shorten it. He oversaw the building of the new main line which followed a new route and used massive cuttings and embankments to avoid the need for locks where possible. It was wider, had a towpath on both banks, and reduced the distance by 7 miles (11 km). The remaining problem was that the canal at its eastern end was accessed by the 13 locks of the Farmers Bridge flight. Boats coming from the Birmingham and Fazeley Canal had to ascend through the 11 locks of the Aston Flight to reach them, while boats from the Warwick and Birmingham Canal, later the Grand Union Canal, had to ascend through the six locks of the Ashted flight on the Digbeth Branch.

As part of documentation to support a proposed new canal, the Birmingham Canal Navigations reported in 1839 that between 20 and 30 boats were often queueing at the top of the Farmers Bridge flight, waiting to descend, and a similar number would be waiting at the bottom, waiting to ascend. The queues were particularly bad during the autumn and winter months, even though the locks were open 24 hours a day, including on Sundays, to try to alleviate the situation. The proposed Tame Valley Canal would provide a northern bypass around Birmingham, and the short Birmingham and Warwick Junction Canal would reduce the number of locks to be worked by boats from the Warwick and Birmingham Canal wanting to access the new canal or the Birmingham and Fazeley.

The canal was authorised by an Act of Parliament, the Birmingham Canal Navigations Act 1839 (2 & 3 Vict. c. lxi), which was for a canal from Salford Junction on the Birmingham and Fazeley Canal, to the Danks Branch of the Walsall Canal. It would be built by the Birmingham Canal Navigations. Before construction started, another act was obtained, the Wyrley and Essington Canal Navigation Act 1840 (3 & 4 Vict. c. xxiv), which altered the line, most notably at the Walsall end, where the canal would join the main line of the Walsall Canal, rather than ending at the winding Danks Branch. Work began in 1841 and it opened on Wednesday 14 February 1844, on the same day as the Birmingham and Warwick Junction Canal. Its engineers were James Walker and Alfred Burges the company engineers. The resident engineer was Mr. Horne, the contractors were Treadwell, Jackson and Bean for the principal part of the works, and Mr. Townshend for the portion near Tipton.

Just three years later, the connectivity of the Tame Valley Canal was improved when the Rushall Canal opened. It ran northwards from Rushall Junction, on the Tame Valley Canal, to Longwood Junction, where the Hay Head and Daws End Branches of the Wyrley and Essington Canal met. The canal opened in 1847, and provided access to the coal mines of Cannock. The Hay Head Branch has since closed to navigation, and has become a nature reserve, although a short stub of it remains as moorings.

== Features ==
Point	Image	Coordinates (Links to map resources)	OS Grid Ref	Notes
Tame Valley Junction		52.5400°N 2.0354°W	SO976936	0.0 miles
A41 road		52.5401°N 2.0349°W	SO977936	
Gold Hill Wharf (approx, site of)		52.5412°N 2.0278°W	SO981937	0.4
Midland Metro		52.5429°N 2.0188°W	SO987939	0.7
Holloway Bank Wharf (site of)		52.545°N 2.011°W	SO992941	1.0
Chase Line crossing		52.5512°N 1.9750°W	SP016948	2.7
M5 motorway aqueduct (west arm)		52.5517°N 1.9713°W	SP019949	2.9
River Tame		52.5513°N 1.9661°W	SP022948	3.1
Rushall Junction		52.5504°N 1.9565°W	SP029947	3.5
M5 motorway (east arm)		52.5498°N 1.9555°W	SP030947	3.6
High Bridges, Newton Road (A4041)		52.5438°N 1.94832°W	SP035940	4.0; Original bridge replaced circa 1967, when the road was made a dual carriageway
Chimney Bridge		52.5427°N 1.9471°W	SP035939	4.1
Hamstead Wharf and basin (site of)		52.5389°N 1.9403°W	SP038936	4.4
Spouthouse Lane Aqueduct		52.5374°N 1.9349°W	SP044933	4.7
Piercy Aqueduct		52.5360°N 1.9302°W	SP047931	5.0
Freeth Bridge		52.5331°N 1.9203°W	SP054928	5.4
A34 road		52.5326°N 1.9155°W	SP057927	5.6
Perry Barr Top Lock (1)		52.5326°N 1.9144°W	SP061927	5.6
Perry Barr Lock 2		52.5327°N 1.9126°W	SP059928	5.7
Perry Barr Locks Bridge		52.5326°N 1.9120°W	SP061928	5.7
Perry Barr Lock 3		52.5327°N 1.9109°W	SP060928	5.8
Perry Barr Lock 4		52.5327°N 1.9091°W	SP061928	5.8
Perry Barr Lock 5		52.5328°N 1.9073°W	SP062928	5.9
Perry Barr Lock 6		52.5328°N 1.9056°W	SP064928	6.0
Perry Barr Lock 7		52.5329°N 1.9039°W	SP065928	6.1
Perry Reservoir		52.5320°N 1.9024°W	SP066927	6.2
M6 motorway		52.5328°N 1.9000°W	SP067928	6.3
Perry Barr Lock 8		52.5318°N 1.8961°W	SP070927	6.4
Perry Barr Lock 9		52.5308°N 1.8938°W	SP072925	6.5
Perry Barr Lock 10		52.5301°N 1.8924°W	SP072925	6.6
Wharf		52.5299°N 1.8920°W	SP073924	6.6
College Road Bridge (A453)		52.5299°N 1.8920°W	SP073924	6.6
Perry Barr Lock 11		52.5285°N 1.8892°W	SP075923	6.7
M6 motorway		52.5229°N 1.8815°W	SP080917	7.2
A4040 road		52.5198°N 1.8788°W	SP083913	
Perry Barr Lock 12 (Witton Locks)		52.5148°N 1.8725°W	SP086908	7.8
Perry Barr Lock 13 (Witton Locks)		52.5140°N 1.8712°W	SP087907	7.9
Cross-City Line		52.5118°N 1.8665°W	SP090904	8.2
Gravelly Hill Interchange		52.5111°N 1.8652°W	SP091904	8.4
Lichfield Road (A5127)		52.5089°N 1.8603°W	SP094901	8.5
Salford Junction		52.5087°N 1.8598°W	SP095901	8.5

== See also ==
- Canals of Great Britain
- History of the British canal system

== Bibliography ==
- Butt, R V J (1995). The DIrectory of Railway Stations. Patrick Stephens. ISBN 978-1-85260-508-7.
- Cumberlidge, Jane (2009). Inland Waterways of Great Britain (8th Ed.). Imray Laurie Norie and Wilson. ISBN 978-1-84623-010-3.
- Hadfield, Charles (1985). The Canals of the West Midlands. David and Charles. ISBN 978-0-7153-8644-6.
- Nicholson (2003). Nicholson Guides Vol 3: Birmingham and the Heart of England. Harper Collins. ISBN 978-0-00-713666-7.
- Nicholson (2006). Nicholson Guides Vol 2: Severn Avon and Birmingham. Harper Collins. ISBN 978-0-00-721110-4.
- Pearson, Michael (1989). Canal Companion - Birmingham Canal Navigations. J. M. Pearson & Associates. ISBN 978-0-907864-49-3.
