= Bentley, West Midlands =

Area in Walsall, West Midlands, England

Coordinates: 52.5933°N 2.0215°W

Bentley
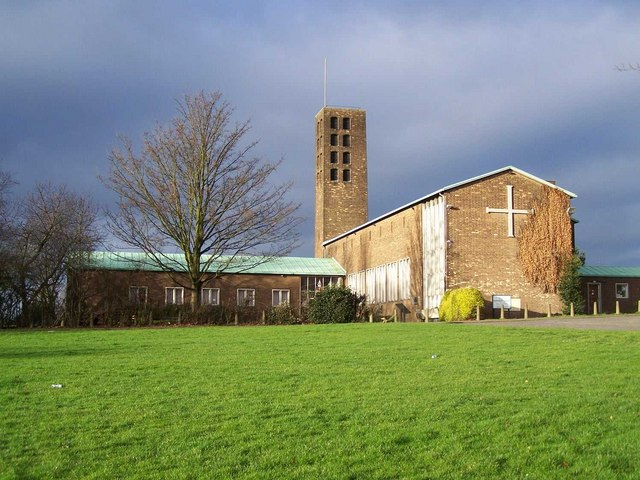
- Emmanuel Church

- Location within the West Midlands
- Metropolitan borough: Walsall
- Metropolitan county: West Midlands
- Region: West Midlands
- Country: England
- Sovereign state: United Kingdom
- Police: West Midlands
- Fire: West Midlands
- Ambulance: West Midlands

Bentley is an area in the Metropolitan Borough of Walsall, in the county of the West Midlands, England, near to Junction 10 of the M6 Motorway. It borders the towns of Willenhall and Darlaston, and the areas of Beechdale and Alumwell.

== History ==
Bentley is noted for its involvement in the English Civil War, when in 1651, after the Battle of Worcester, King Charles II took shelter with the Lane Family in Bentley Hall while attempting to escape to exile. Jane Lane famously helped the King escape by disguising him as her servant, and riding with him to Somerset. Bentley Cairn marks the location of Bentley Hall upon the hill. The Cairn has recently undergone improvements, carried out by the Bentley Cairn Restoration Group.

In addition to these improvements, the remains of another manor house near the Cairn were discovered during May 2006, and an archaeological survey will take place by the Bentley Cairn Restoration Group, funded by the Darlaston Local Neighbourhood Partnership, in order to confirm and restore the remains of the house.

A report on health and sanitation in Walsall Rural District in 1919 described the parish of Bentley as "thinly populated" and "consisting almost entirely of pit mounds" from exhausted coal mines, though some surface coal digging was observed. There were no places of worship, schools or other public buildings.

Local authority housing was built in Bentley between the late 1940s and early 1960s, as part of the post Second World War housing construction boom, when it came within the borders of Darlaston Urban District Council; this now-defunct authority built several hundred homes at the north side of the Walsall to Wolverhampton road. Most of the roads on the estate took their name from Second World War heroes or from members of the British royal family. Further development took place from the late 1970s to the early 1980s with construction of the Old Hall estate, a development of several hundred local authority houses and apartments.

Bentley was formerly a township in the parish of Wolverhampton, in 1866 Bentley became a separate civil parish, on 1 April 1934 the parish was abolished and merged with Darlaston and Short Heath. In the 1931 national census, the last carried out before the parish was dissolved, Bentley parish had a population of 507.

== Local points of interest ==
Bentley is locally well known for its points of interest. They include Bentley Cairn, the ABC park, the lake and the disused railway line which runs through Bentley from Walsall and into Willenhall.

There are multiple churches in Bentley, including the Grade II-listed Church of England parish church Emmanuel Church constructed in 1954 and Free Church of England church of St. Andrew, established in 1943.

More recently Bentley has become well known because of its proximity to the M6 motorway, a multi-screen cinema, casino, and a variety of restaurants.

== Public transport ==
Several bus routes serve Bentley, linking it to Bilston, Darlaston, New Invention, Walsall, Willenhall and Wolverhampton. These services are operated by National Express West Midlands and Diamond Bus.

There was a proposed expansion on West Midlands Metro linking Walsall, Beechdale, Bentley, Willenhall, Wednesfield, New Cross Hospital and Wolverhampton. This has since been ruled out due to "lack of local support" for the move and have shifted focus to reopening train stations in Willenhall and Darlaston

There was a station around half a mile east of Bentley near Bloxwich Lane which served Bentley until its closure in 1898 although the line from Walsall to Wolverhampton continued to be used by freight and goods traffic until 1960s when the section from North Walsall to Willenhall was closed. The station is now under the M6 motorway near junction 10. Although inaccessible, one can make out where the embankment was should they try to pinpoint the location near Bloxwich Lane and the motorway.

== Education ==
Bentley has one Secondary School and several primary schools. These are:

- County Bridge Primary
- Bentley West Primary
- King Charles Primary
- Lodge Farm Primary
- Willenhall School Sports College, later renamed Willenhall E-ACT Academy (Lodge Farm and WSSC are officially in Willenhall, but have an entrance from Bentley)

Additionally, Jane Lane Special School is located in Bentley.

== Bibliography ==
- Gardiner, S. R. (1903). History of the Commonwealth and Protectorate, 1649-1656. London: Longmans.
