= Wednesfield railway station =

Former railway station in England

Wednesfield
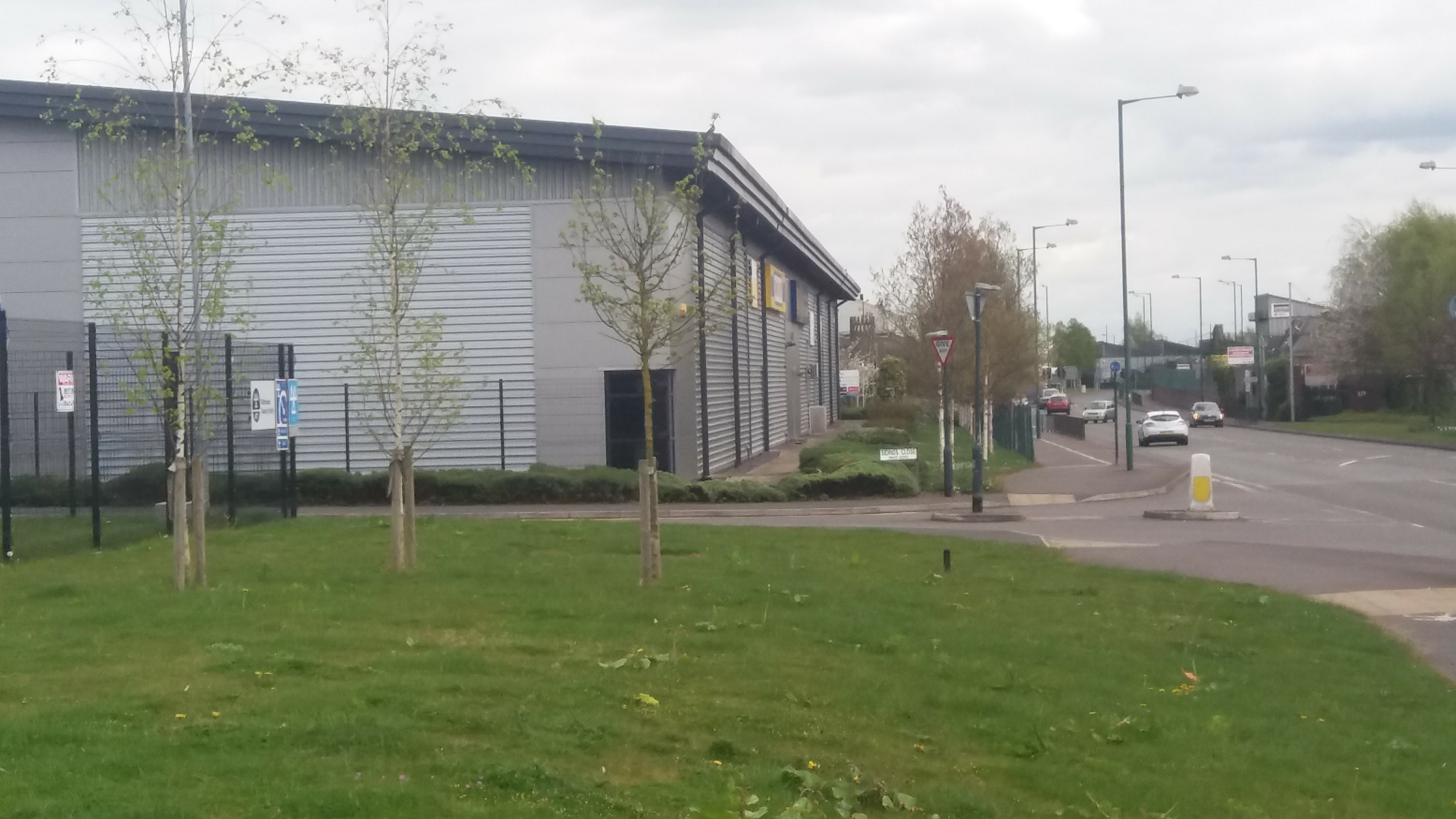
- The former station site at Wednesfield, now the Wednesfield Way.

General information
- Location: Wednesfield, Wolverhampton; England
- Coordinates: 52.5955°N 2.0814°W
- Grid reference: SO945997
- Platforms: 2

Other information
- Status: Disused

History
- Original company: Wolverhampton and Walsall Railway
- Pre-grouping: Midland Railway
- Post-grouping: London, Midland and Scottish Railway

Key dates
- 1872: Opened
- 1931: Closed to passengers
- 1983: Closed to all traffic
Location

Wednesfield railway station was a station built by the Wolverhampton and Walsall Railway in 1872, and was operated by the Midland Railway from 1876 onwards. It served the Wednesfield area of Wolverhampton, and was located near to Neachells Lane.

The station closed in 1931, although the line remained in use until the 1980s for the goods depot in Wednesfield and nearby factories.

== Station site today ==
All evidence of the former station site and trackbed have been wiped away with redevelopment in the area and the Wednesfield Way from Neachells Lane towards Bentley Bridge Retail Park utilizes some of the trackbed. All evidence of the railway has long vanished other than the bridge supports near to Deans Road although they now form a canal and pedestrian walkway.

| Preceding station | Disused railways | Following station |
|---|---|---|
| Heath Town | Wolverhampton and Walsall Railway; Later Midland Railway | Willenhall Stafford Street |
