= Heath Town railway station =

Former railway station in England

Heath Town

General information
- Location: Heath Town, Wolverhampton; England
- Coordinates: 52.5923°N 2.1036°W
- Grid reference: SO930993
- Platforms: 2

Other information
- Status: Disused

History
- Original company: Wolverhampton and Walsall Railway
- Pre-grouping: Midland Railway

Key dates
- 1 November 1872: Opened
- 1 April 1910: Closed
Location

Heath Town railway station was a station built by the Wolverhampton and Walsall Railway in 1872, and was operated by the Midland Railway from 1876 onwards. It served the Heath Town area of Wolverhampton, and was located just off Grove Street.

The station closed in 1910.

== Station site today ==
The station site has since been built on with the exception of the bridge and line as they remain but overgrown and the Wolverhampton bound line been lifted and the support for it removed leaving a big hole on the left of the bridge. Some rail is still present on the Walsall bound line and some supports of the former stairs to the Walsall bound platform.

Preceding station	Disused railways	Following station
Wolverhampton High Level	Wolverhampton and Walsall Railway; Later Midland Railway	Wednesfield

== See also ==
- List of closed railway stations in Britain
