= Junction (canal) =

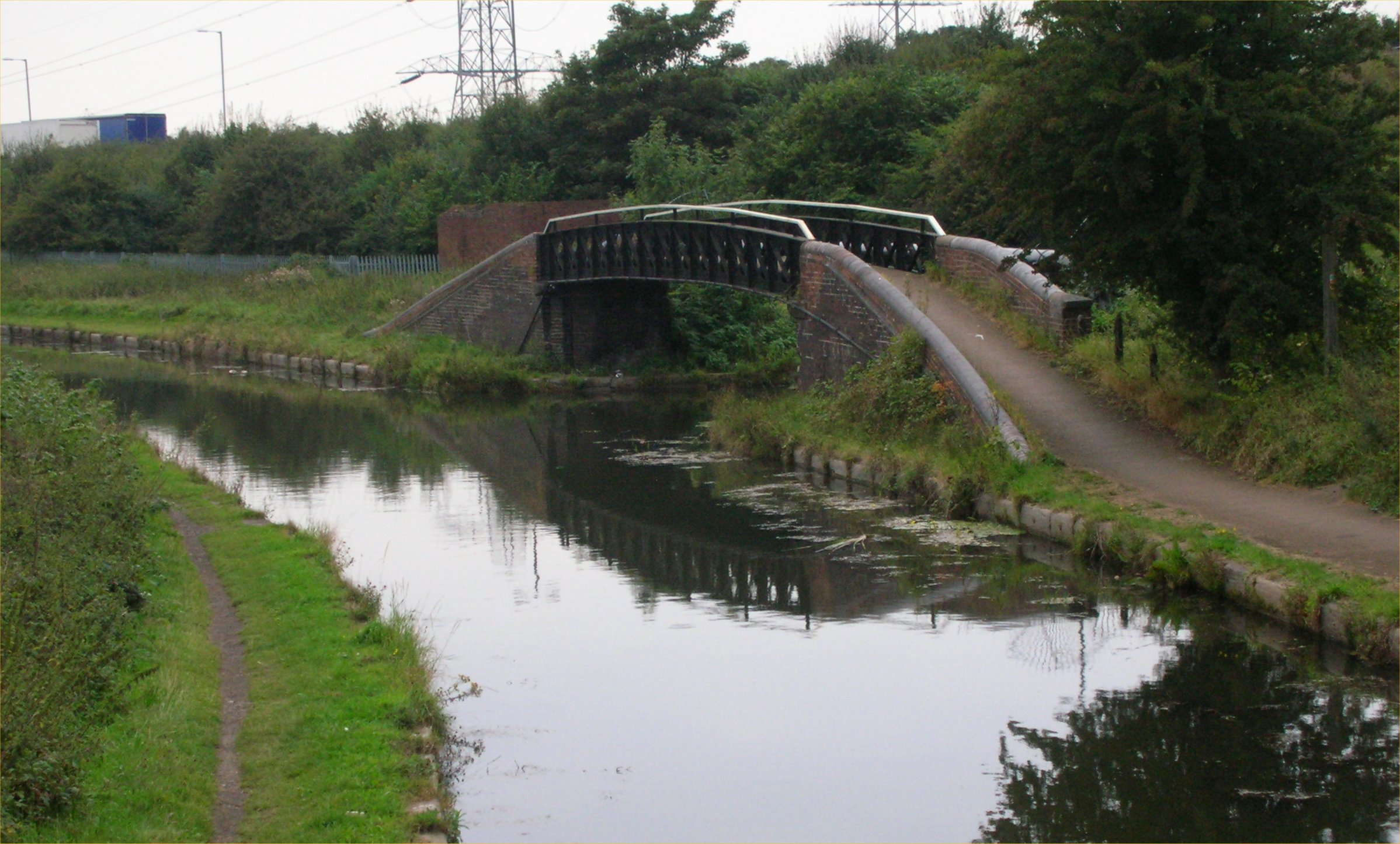
Rushall Junction is the southern limit of the Rushall Canal where it meets the Tame Valley Canal in the West Midlands, England

A canal junction is a place at which two or more canal routes converge or diverge. This implies a physical connection between the beds of the two canals (commonly in the form of a T junction) as opposed to them crossing on different levels e.g. via an aqueduct.

Where the canals were originally owned by different companies there is often a stop lock at the junction.

In some cases, the creation of a canal junction caused a town to grow up alongside.

== See also ==
- Lock (canal)
- List of canal junctions in the United Kingdom
- List of canal aqueducts in the United Kingdom
