= Catshill Junction =

Canal junction in West Midlands, England

Coordinates: 52°38′28″N 1°55′40″W

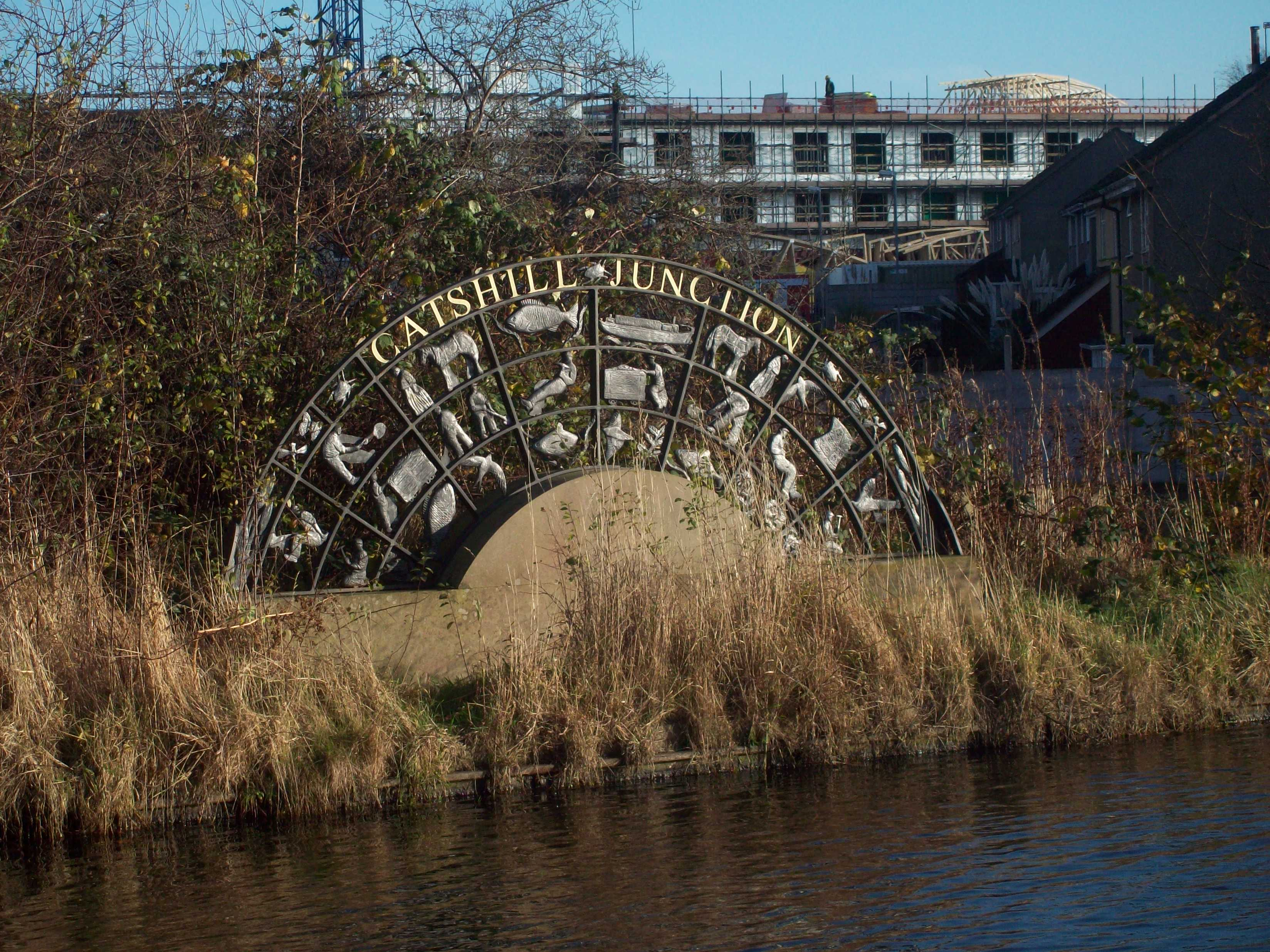
- A sculpture at Catshill Junction

Specifications
- Status: Open
- Navigation authority: Canal & River Trust

History
- Date completed: 1800

Catshill Junction (grid reference SK048048) is a canal junction at the northern limit of the Daw End Branch Canal where it meets the Wyrley and Essington Canal main line, near Brownhills, in West Midlands, England.

== History ==
When the Wyrley and Essington Canal was authorised by Act of Parliament in 1792, it was for a canal from the coal fields of Wyrley and Essington to the north of Bloxwich to the urban centre of Wolverhampton, with a branch to Walsall, ending near the present Birchills Junction. However, the company obtained a second Act in 1794, before the original canal was completed, which authorised an extension eastwards from Birchills, passing through Pelsall to reach more collieries at Brownhills, close to Catshill Junction, and on to the site of Ogley Junction, from where it would descend through thirty locks to reach Huddlesford Junction, to the east of Lichfield. Huddlesford Junction was effectively part of the Coventry Canal, but that section had been built by the Birmingham and Fazeley Canal in a complicated agreement to ensure that the Birmingham and Fazeley would be part of a larger network, and therefore more likely to be profitable. The Birchills Branch became part of the main line, and the former main line to Wyrley Bank became a branch.

The 1794 Act also authorised a number of branches, including one to serve limeworks at Hay Head. This was known as the Daw End Branch, and left the main line at Catshill Junction. The whole of the main line was completed in 1797, but there were problems with water supply, compounded by the failure of the reservoir dam at Sneyd in 1799. These were resolved in 1800 with the completion of the Chasewater Reservoir, which fed water into the canal at Ogley Junction, via a navigable feeder called the Anglesey Branch. The Hay Head branch and hence the junction was also opened in that year. Despite the fact that the limestone quarries which the junction and branch served were described as "on a very extensive plan, inexhaustible as quantity, and of very superior quality", they were unused by 1809, resulting in less traffic using the junction, but were back in business by 1822. The junction saw increased traffic after 1847, when the Rushall Canal linked the southern end of the branch to the Tame Valley Canal. It was one of several links between the Wyrley and Essington Canal and the Birmingham Canal Navigations system, built following the amalgamation of the two companies in 1840.

== Location ==
Most of the Wyrley and Essington Canal, including Catshill Junction, was built on the 473-foot (144 m) contour, known as the Wolverhampton Level. From Catshill Junction, the Wyrley and Essington Canal heads initially eastwards and then to the north. It reaches Anglesey Basin, on the edge of Chasewater Reservoir, after 2.4 miles (3.9 km), passing Ogley Junction, where the locks to Huddlesford began, after 0.9 miles (1.4 km). The locks were abandoned in 1954, but are the subject of a restoration campaign, and that section of the Wyrley and Essington is now known as the Lichfield Canal.

To the west, the canal is level to its junction with BCN Main Line at Horseley Fields Junction, a distance of 15.3 miles (24.6 km), and the BCN Main Line continues on the same level in both directions. At the junction, the towpath is on the south bank of the Wyrley and Essington, and is carried over the Daw End Branch by a towpath bridge. The branch heads south from the junction, and is level for 5.3 miles (8.5 km) to Longwood Junction, where it joins the Rushall Canal end-on. The descent through the nine locks of the Rushall Canal begins just after the junction.

The area to the west of the junction was once heathland and rough pasture which was part of the Royal Forest of Cannock. Most of it was destroyed by tipping colliery waste on it, and then using it as a rubbish dump in the 1950s, but parts have since been reclaimed. The section immediately west of the junction is all that remains of Clayhanger Common, but it consists of marshy acidic grassland, which has enabled willow and birch trees as well as heather to colonise it. The Common is now a designated Site of Importance for Nature Conservation.

== See also ==
- Canals of the United Kingdom
- History of the British canal system

== Bibliography ==
- Cumberlidge, Jane (2009). Inland Waterways of Great Britain (8th Ed.). Imray Laurie Norie and Wilson. ISBN 978-1-84623-010-3.
- Hadfield, Charles (1985). The Canals of the West Midlands. David and Charles. ISBN 0-7153-8644-1.
- Nicholson (2006). Nicholson Guide Vol 2 - Severn, Avon & Birmingham. Harper Collins. ISBN 978-0-00-721110-4.
- Nicholson (2003). Nicholson Guide Vol 3 - Birmingham & the Heart of England. Harper Collins. ISBN 0-00-713666-8.
- Pearson, Michael (1989). Canal Companion - Birmingham Canal Navigations. J. M. Pearson & Associates. ISBN 0-907864-49-X.
