= Bentley Canal =

Canal in Birmingham, England

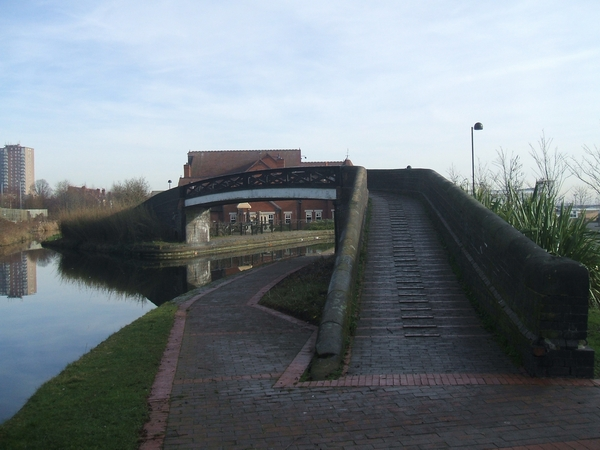
- The towpath bridge over the entrance to the canal where it joined the Wyrley and Essington
- Interactive map of Bentley Canal

Specifications
- Locks: 10
- Status: filled in

History
- Date of first use: 1843
- Date closed: 1960s

Geography
- Start point: Wednesfield
- End point: Bentley
- Branch: Neachells Branch
- Connects to: Wyrley and Essington Canal, Anson Branch

The Bentley Canal is an abandoned canal that was part of the Birmingham Canal Navigations in England. A very short section still exists where it joins the Wyrley and Essington Canal in Wolverhampton. From there it headed generally southeast through Willenhall and Walsall and connected with the Anson Branch and thus the Walsall Canal. The main line opened in 1843, with the Neachell Hall Branch following two years later. The branch closed in 1953 and the main line in the early 1960s.

== History ==
In 1820, the Birmingham Canal Company had approached the Wyrley and Essington Canal, with a view to amalgamation. This had been declined, but from 1825 mineowners in the Walsall area petitioned for a junction between the two systems. Nothing happened for some years, but in 1837, Walsall Town Council began pushing both companies for a solution. After much disagreement, the Wyrley and Essington announced that they were ready to apply for an act of Parliament to authorise the construction of a junction at Walsall, which led to the Birmingham Canal Company agreeing to amalgamation. Both signed an agreement to proceed on 9 February 1840, and an act of Parliament, the Wyrley and Essington Canal Navigation Act 1840 (3 & 4 Vict. c. xxiv) was obtained to April to authorise the move. The Bentley Canal was one of three links between the systems built shortly afterwards. The other two were the Walsall Junction Canal, which linked the north end of the Walsall Canal to Birchills Junction, and the Rushall Canal, between the Tame Valley Canal and the Daw End Branch of the Wyrley and Essington.

In 1828, the company completed a branch to Ridgeacre at huge cost, and accepted an estimate for the Bentley Branch of £7,135, but they were in the middle of a much bigger enterprise, to lower the level of their main summit, and no further action appears to have been taken concerning the Bentley Branch. In 1839, work on the Tame Valley Canal began, under the direction of Messrs Walker and Burgess, who were the engineers. James Walker suggested that it should be built following a different line to that specified in the Birmingham Canal Navigations Act 1839 (2 & 3 Vict. c. lxi), the act of Parliament that authorised the canal and the committee approved his revised plans. When there was opposition to the new line from landowners, the committee agreed to revert to the original line, but Walker was infuriated, and wrote a long letter to them. They reconsidered, and agreed to proceed with Walker's new line, for which they obtained a new act of Parliament, the Wyrley and Essington Canal Navigation Act 1840 (3 & 4 Vict. c. xxiv). By August 1840, work on the Tame Valley Canal was progressing well, and Walker turned his attention to the Bentley Canal. He suggested that they dispense with the ten locks authorised by the act, and instead build two sections of level canal, one running from the Anson Branch at the Walsall level, continuing as far as was possible before higher ground prevented further progress, and another running from Wood Green to Portobello, on the same level. The committee again agreed with him.

Tenders were invited for the level canals, and prices received ranged from £11,300 to £27,691. The cheapest one was accepted, with four per cent of the cost going to Walker and Burgess. In June 1841, the committee approved plans to connect the Bentley Branch to the Wednesfield level through four locks, and then proceeding to the Wyrley and Essington Canal. The Wednesfield section was estimated to cost £6,850, and tenders for the whole thing ranged from £19,208 to £28,500. Of the thirteen tenders received, they opted for the cheapest. Effectively, this reinstated the parliamentary line, in place of Walker's level canals. John Merry reported on progress in October 1842, noting that there were grooves for stop planks at every bridge, and they were all fitted with iron plates to prevent ropes wearing away the brickwork. Coping stones along the top of the locks were of Derbyshire stone, and the entrances to the locks had iron fenders to prevent damage to the brickwork. Each lock had a single paddle, operated by a windlass and rack.

Merry had suggested that the canal would be open by January 1843, but the opening was delayed until 28 April. Soon afterwards, Walker's plan for the level Wood Green branch was dropped. The canal as built ran for 3.4 miles (5.5 km) through 10 locks. At its western end, it started at Wednesfield Junction, and the Wednesfield flight of six locks descended between there and the junction with the Neachells Branch. The Sandbeds flight consisted of another four locks, a little more than half way along the canal. The canal fell into dereliction in the 1960s. The 2.46-mile (3.96 km) section from east of Neachells Bridge, near the bottom lock of the Wednesfield flight to its junction with the Anson Branch, was abandoned as a result of the British Transport Commission Act 1961 (9 & 10 Eliz. 2. c. xxxvi).

The official end of the navigable section was at a brick and girder bridge, located between Lock 6 and the Neachells Branch. The lane that it carried has now been replaced by the A4124 Lakefield Road. The Wednesfield Locks were in theory still open until 1985, but could not be navigated as there was heavy silting, the paddle gear on the locks had been removed, and rubbish had been dumped into the canal.

The Neachells Branch was a short branch of 0.4 miles (0.64 km) which opened in 1845 to serve Neachell Hall Colliery. It closed in 1953, and its abandonment was formally authorised by the British Transport Commission Act 1953 (1 & 2 Eliz. 2. c. xlii).

== Route ==
The Bentley Canal left the Wyrley and Essington Canal at Wednesfield Junction. A cast iron bridge carried the towpath over the junction, and is still in situ. It dates from the mid-nineteenth century, and is a grade II listed structure. A short section of the canal remains in water, and is used for moorings for the Nickelodeon canalside pub. The first lock was located immediately to the east of the watered stub, and was followed by two more. The canal is heading east at this point, and the towpath was located on the south bank. The remains of old quarries were on both sides of the canal, and there was a metal works washing plant on the north bank in the 1950s. Bradburn's Bridge carried a railway siding over the tail of the third lock. Beyond the bridge, Wolverhampton Metal Works occupied the south bank and there was a foundry on the north bank, although it had been a chocolate and confectionery works in 1902. The fourth lock was immediately before Well Lane Bridge. Between here and Neachells Bridge, there was a metal recovery works and allotment gardens on the north bank, and a cabinet works and two colour works to the south. This whole area has been redeveloped since the canal closed, although Well Lane and Neachells Lane still follow their original courses.

Two more locks occupied the next section, with Merrills Hall Bridge carrying Merrills Hall Lane over the canal just below the second. On the north bank were a steel works and a sports ground, which had been allotment gardens in 1938. A bowling green was nearest the canal, and a footbridge crossed it at this point. Reliance Works manufactured steel tubes on the south bank, and was sandwiched between the canal and a railway line. Beyond the bridge, Neachells Junction Bridge carried the towpath over the Neachells Branch. The branch headed due south. Another footbridge crossed it before it passed under a railway bridge. The settling tanks, filter beds and sludge beds of the Wednesfield Council sewage treatment works occupied the east bank of the branch beyond the bridge. A short arm to the east once served a coal mine, after which Water Lane crossed the canal. Beyond it, a wide basin served the Neachell Hall colliery, situated to the east of the canal, but disused by 1919.

Returning to the main line, the Weldless Steel Tube Works were located on the north bank, and a gas furnace plant was to the south. Hill's Bridge carried a footpath over the canal. Fly Bridge, which was overshadowed by electricity pylons, carried another footpath. The Reliance Brass Foundry occupied the south bank just before Fibbersley Bridge, which now carries the B4484 road. Beyond it, the course of the canal is still clearly defined to the north of a housing estate. Dingle Bridge allowed walkers to cross from the end of Dingle Lane, while at Monmer Lane, there were two bridges, one to carry the road and a separate footbridge immediately to the west. An industrial estate occupied the south bank, as the canal turned towards the south east. After Spring Bank Bridge, there was a wharf and a short arm, with a towpath bridge over it, which served the Spring Vale iron foundry, which later became the Spring Vale stamping works.

Next the canal passes between the remains of Short Heath Brick Works on the north bank and Spring Bank Brick Works on the south. There were two locks, with a small arm and wharf to the north, between them. Sandbeds Bridge connected Charles Street and Stringers Lane, beyond which a third lock was located beneath a railway bridge. The fourth lock on this section was just before Clarke's Lane Bridge, now carrying the A462 road. Farm Bridge joined the end of Durham Avenue. The canal turned to the south to pass under Wolverhampton Road West (now the B4464, formerly the A454) at County Bridge, and resumed its south-easterly course at Hopyard Bridge. A large cemetery occupies the north bank between the two bridges. Pendlebury Colliery occupied the south bank beyond the bridge, and had a small arm with a towpath bridge. The course of the canal is no longer visible from here, as its route is occupied by County Bridge Primary School. Beyond the school, Bentley Road North crossed at Bentley Lane Bridge, and the canal continued to join the Anson Branch just below Bentley Mill Bridge. The Anson Branch is no longer navigable, but is still partially watered.

== Points of interest ==
Point	Coordinates (Links to map resources)	OS Grid Ref	Notes
Wednesfield Junction	52.5970°N 2.0925°W	SO937999	Wyrley and Essington Canal
Neachells Lane bridge	52.5960°N 2.0796°W	SO946998	
Neachells Branch Junction	52.5957°N 2.0752°W	SO949998	
Neachells Branch terminus	52.5909°N 2.0756°W	SO948992	
Monmer Lane bridge	52.5940°N 2.0519°W	SO964996	
Clarkes Lane bridge (A462)	52.5906°N 2.0398°W	SO973992	
Wolverhampton Road West bridge	52.5872°N 2.0324°W	SO978988	
Hopyard Road	52.5846°N 2.0299°W	SO979985	
Bentley Canal Junction	52.5812°N 2.0182°W	SO987981	Anson Branch

== See also ==
- Canals of the United Kingdom
- History of the British canal system
- Waterscape

== Bibliography ==
- Broadbridge, S R (1974). The Birmingham Canal Navigations Vol 1: 1768-1846. David and Charles. ISBN 978-0-7153-6381-2.
- Chester-Browne, Richard (1991). The Other Sixty Miles. Birmingham Canal Navigations Society.
- Dean, Richard (1989). Canals of Birmingham (Historical Canal Maps series No.2) (3rd ed.). M&M Baldwin. ISBN 978-0-9561306-0-0. (for route and other details)
- Hadfield, Charles (1985). The Canals of the West Midlands (3rd ed.). David & Charles. ISBN 0-7153-8644-1.
