= Bentley railway station =

Bentley railway station may refer to:

- Bentley railway station (South Yorkshire), South Yorkshire
- Bentley railway station (Hampshire), a station on the Alton Line
- Bentley railway station (West Midlands), a closed station on the Wolverhampton and Walsall Railway in the West Midlands
- Bentley railway station (Suffolk), a former station on the Great Eastern Main Line
- Great Bentley railway station, a station on the Sunshine Coast Line in Essex
