= Short Heath railway station =

Former railway station in England

Short Heath
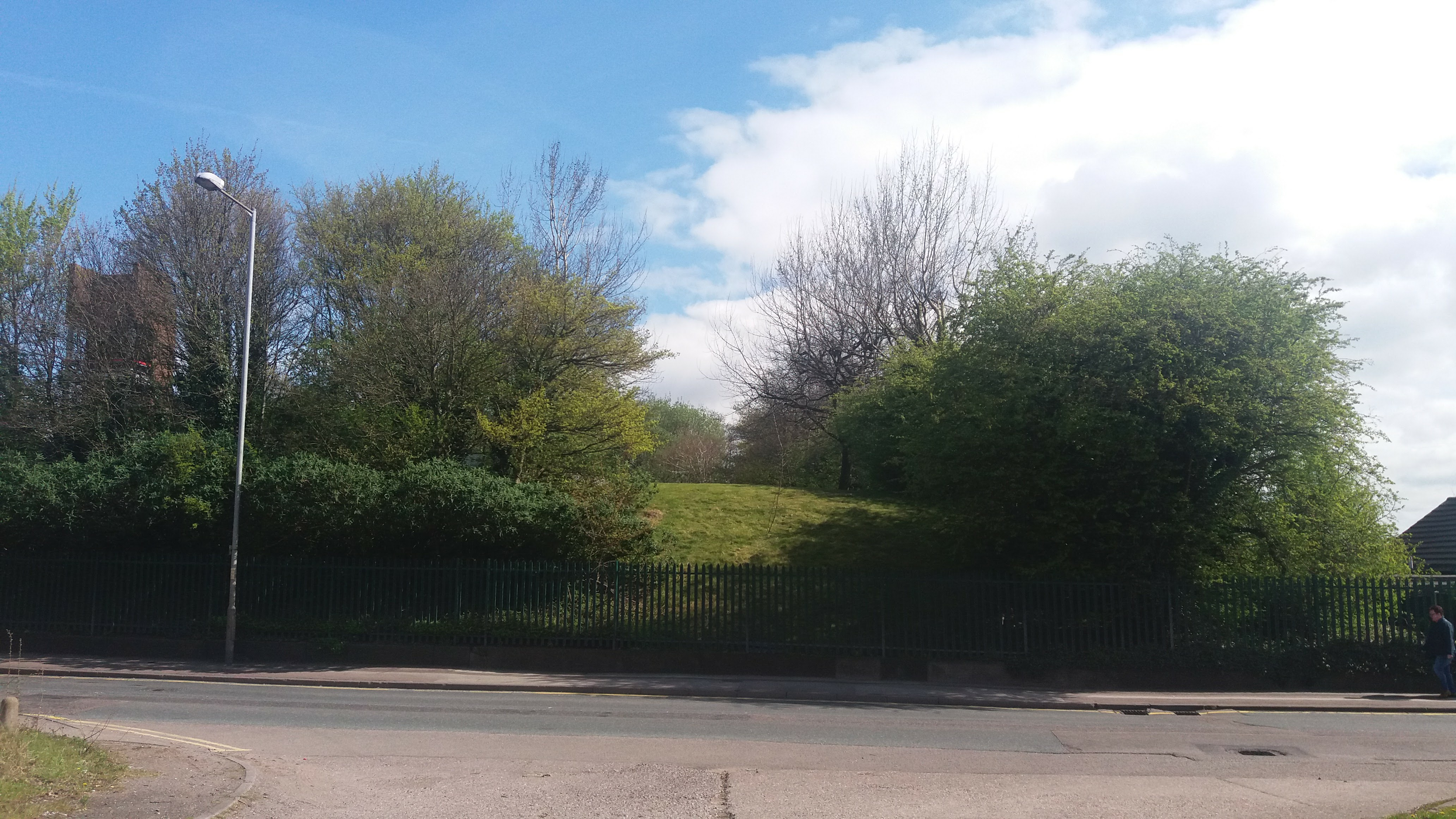

General information
- Location: Short Heath, Metropolitan Borough of Walsall; England
- Coordinates: 52.5923°N 2.0393°W
- Grid reference: SO974993
- Platforms: 2

Other information
- Status: Disused

History
- Original company: Wolverhampton and Walsall Railway
- Pre-grouping: Midland Railway
- Post-grouping: London, Midland and Scottish Railway

Key dates
- 1 November 1872: Opened
- 5 January 1931: Closed to passengers
- 7 December 1964: Closed
Location

Short Heath railway station was a station built by the Wolverhampton and Walsall Railway in 1872, and was operated by the Midland Railway from 1876 onwards. It served the area of Short Heath, to the north east of Willenhall, although it was located well to the south of Short Heath itself.

The station closed in 1931 for passengers and for freight on 7 December 1964.

== Station site today ==
The station site is now a small hill near Willenhall Fire Station with the trackbed to the north converted into a public footpath and the trackbed towards Willenhall was removed and is now a slope towards small industrial units.

Preceding station	Disused railways	Following station
Willenhall Stafford Street	Wolverhampton and Walsall Railway; Later Midland Railway	Bentley
