= Anson Branch =

Canal in West Midlands, England

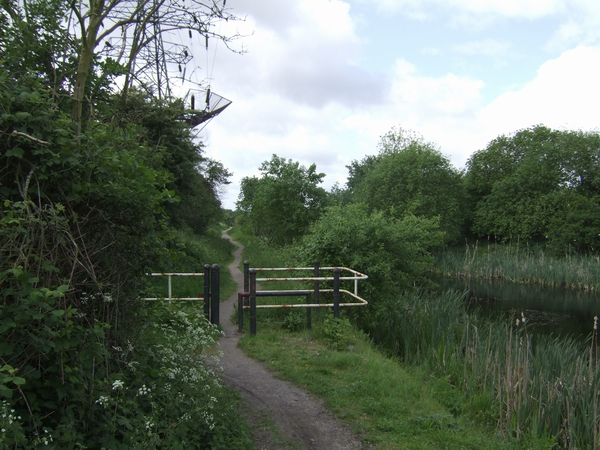
- The canal near Bentley Mill Bridge
- Interactive map of Anson Branch

Specifications
- Locks: 0
- Status: derelict but watered

History
- Original owner: Birmingham Canal Navigations
- Date of act: 1768
- Date of first use: 1830

Geography
- Start point: Bentley Mines
- End point: Walsall Canal
- Branch: Bentley Canal (defunct)
- Branch of: Walsall Canal

The Anson Branch is a short canal in the West Midlands, England. It runs for just over one mile from its junction with the Walsall Canal near Forster's bridge. It forms part of the Birmingham Canal Navigations.

The canal is only partially watered and is no longer navigable. It formerly connected with the now defunct Bentley Canal which, in turn, connected with the Wyrley and Essington Canal. The canal has no locks.

== Route ==
On the Walsall Canal, Forester's Bridge, known as Forster's Bridge in 1904, carried a track over the canal immediately before an aqueduct carried the canal over the former Grand Junction Railway, now part of the West Coast Main Line. The junction with the Anson Branch was just to the north of the aqueduct. It headed to the north-east on a large embankment, which crossed the valley of the River Tame. Darleston Sewage Farm was to the west of the canal and the south of the river, while Bentley Mill, disused in 1904, was to the east of the canal, and Hopyard Brickworks was to the west on the north bank of the river. The embankment ended near to the junction of the Anson Branch with the Bentley Canal, which headed to the west.

Continuing to the north-east, Bentley Mill Bridge carried Bentley Mill Lane over the canal, and this was followed by Bradford Bridge. The next bridge carried Wolverhampton Road over the canal. Immediately following it was a basin to the west, which served some old shafts. Pouk Hill Quarries were served by a tramway, which brought its output to a wharf. Much of the tramway was in a tunnel. Bentley Lane crossed the canal at the point at which it turned to the north. Beyond the bridge was a basin to the east, a larger basin heading north, which connected to a tramway serving Bentley Colliery, and a longer branch which ran to the north-west, towards an area containing old coal shafts in 1904, which were formerly part of Reedswood Colliery.

== History ==
The branch was authorised by the Birmingham Canal Navigation Act 1768 (8 Geo. 3. c. 38), but was not completed until 1830. It was surveyed by Thomas Telford, who estimated that it would cost £9,499 to build. The route had to cross the River Tame, just to the north of the junction with the Walsall Canal, and this required an aqueduct and an embankment. Telford wanted Thomas Townsend to build it, but he was not keen to accept the contract, as he believed that Telford's estimate was too low. However, he was persuaded, and the contract was signed in March 1830.

It was built to serve the coal mines and a limestone quarry in Bentley, which were owned by the Earl of Lichfield. From the Walsall Canal, it headed in a north-easterly direction, and was almost straight for most of its length, apart from near the mines, where it turned to the north to reach a wharf, from which horse tramways connected to the Bentley mines and furnaces. By 1832, several blast furnaces had also been built near to the terminal basin. In order to tap into the mineral resources further to the north, the Bradford Branch was proposed, but only a small section was built as a canal, and the rest was constructed as a narrow-gauge tramway. It was completed in 1840, and was owned and operated by the canal company.

Following the amalgamation of the Wyrley and Essington Canal with the Birmingham Canal Navigations on 9 February 1840, the new company were keen to create junctions between the two systems. The Bentley Canal was one of these, and ran from the Anson Branch to the Wyrley and Essington at Wednesfield. It opened in 1843.

By the 1890s, many of the mines had been worked out, and the local industry was in serious decline in the early twentieth century. However, the canal found a new use, when a power station was built at Birchills. Construction began in 1914, and some of it was operational by 1916, although it was not officially finished until 1922. It required a water supply, and a pumping station with two Mather and Platt pumps was installed beside the canal. The pumps could deliver 10.6 million gallons (48 Megalitres) per day, and once the water had passed through the power station, it was discharged into the Wyrley and Essington Canal to supply the Wolverhampton level of the Birmingham Canal Navigations. As a result, a pumping station near the top of Birchills locks was switched off and dismantled. From 1927, the power station became the responsibility of West Midlands Joint Electricity Authority, and then the British Electricity Authority following nationalisation in 1948. A second power station was commissioned in 1949.

=== Demise ===
The start of the Anson Branch as it leaves the Walsall Canal, The roving bridge was removed fro scrap illegally in the early 1980s.

The section above the Bentley Canal junction was abandoned as a navigation in 1956, and the Bentley Canal and the rest of the Anson Branch were abandoned by the British Transport Commission Act 1961 (9 & 10 Eliz. 2. c. xxxvi). In the 1960s and early 1970s, the Midland Links Motorways were constructed through Birmingham, linking the northern section of the M6 motorway, the southern section of the M5 motorway and the M1 motorway. The section between Shareshill and Darlaston, ending at junction 10, was built between September 1964 and September 1966, while the section from Darlaston to Bescott, ending at junction 9, was built between May 1968 and May 1970. Junction 10 was located above the Anson Branch, with the southern side of the high level roundabout immediately above Bradford Bridge. Because the branch was still supplying water to Birchills power station, a culvert was provided. It was large enough for small maintenance craft such as weed cutters to pass through, although would not be considered large enough for modern pleasure craft.

Despite the branch being officially closed, Bentley Mill Bridge was reconstructed in 1978 with sufficient headroom to allow full navigation, although rubbish was dumped into the canal beneath it, which reduced the depth of water significantly. However, the entire branch was dredged in 1979, including the northern section beyond the M6 culvert. The canal was still navigable as far as the culvert in 1981, but soon afterwards the stability of the embankment across the valley of the River Tame was threatened by underground fires, and to prevent a catastrophic loss of water from the Walsall Canal if the embankment failed, the junction was stanked off, preventing boats from accessing the canal. At a similar time, the roving bridge over the junction was illegally removed for scrap. The single arched bridge over the River Tame remains as an impressive monument to the working canal. The power station was decommissioned in 1980, and the pumps were switched off, since when the branch has gradually deteriorated.

The remains of the branch, covering an area of 13.6 acres (5.5 ha), have been designated as a site of local importance for nature conservation (SLINC) by Walsall Council. The Walsall Canal is a designated area of high historic townscape value, and the Anson Branch is included in that area.

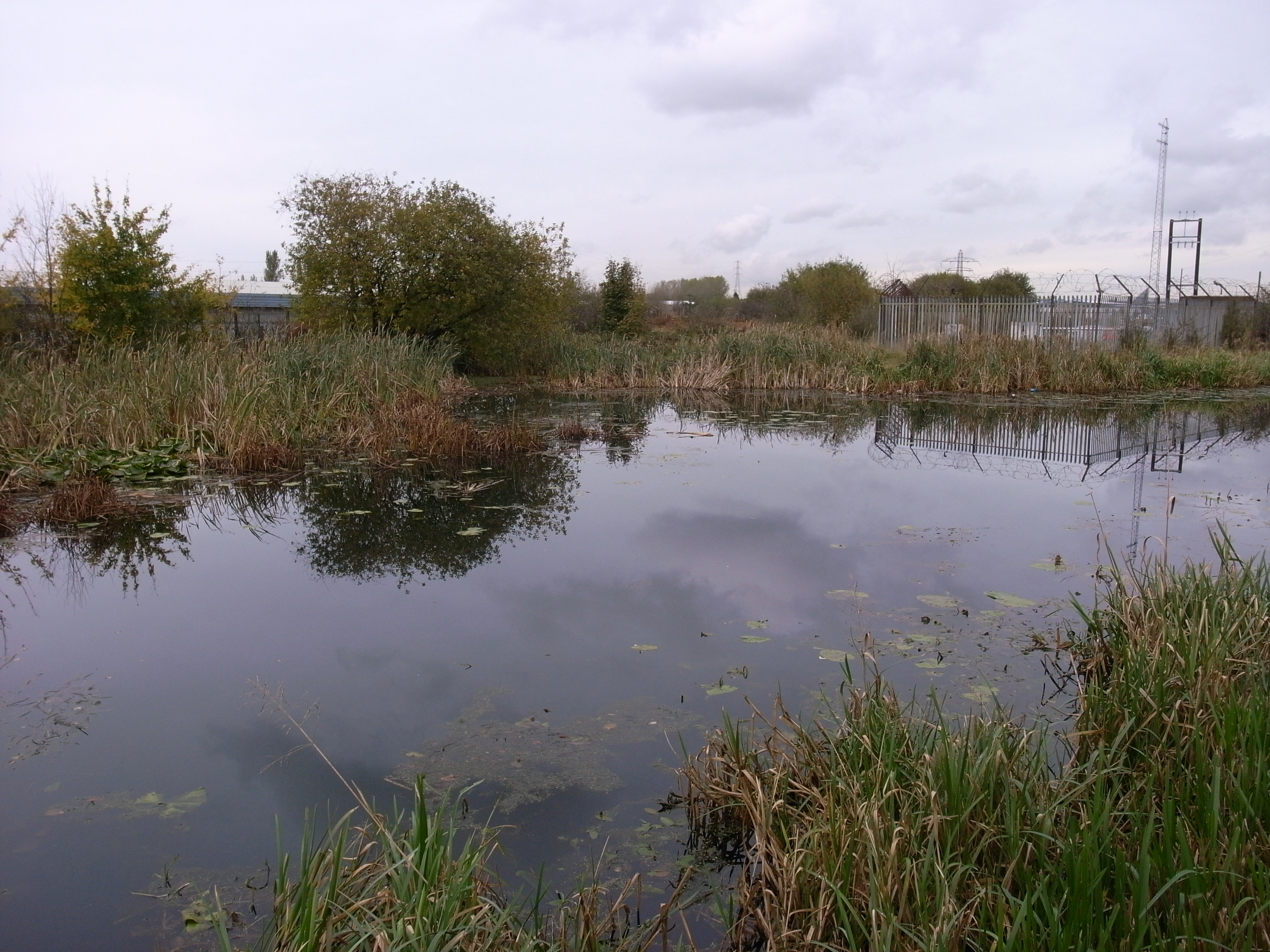
The junction with the Walsall Canal, which runs left and right

== Water quality ==
The Environment Agency measure water quality of the river systems in England, and on a few canals. Each is given an overall ecological status, which may be one of five levels: high, good, moderate, poor and bad. For rivers, there are several components that are used to determine this, including biological status, which looks at the quantity and varieties of invertebrates, angiosperms and fish, but for water bodies such as the canal, which is artificial, ecological potential is assessed by looking at the impacts on the water body and whether there are mitigation measures than can reasonably be applied to improve its condition. Chemical status compares the concentrations of various chemicals against known safe concentrations. It is rated good or fail.

The water quality for the Anson Branch was as follows in 2019. The assessment covers most of the historical route of the canal.

Section	Ecological Status	Chemical Status	Length	Catchment	Channel
Walsall Canal, Anson Branch (isolated section)	Good	Fail	1.3 miles (2.1 km)		artificial

Like most waterways in the UK, the chemical status changed from good to fail in 2019, due to the presence of polybrominated diphenyl ethers (PBDE) and mercury compounds, neither of which had previously been included in the assessment.

== Points of interest ==
Point	Coordinates (Links to map resources)	OS Grid Ref	Notes
Northern terminus	52.5929°N 2.0067°W	SO995994	Bentley mines and quarry
Bentley Canal Junction	52.5812°N 2.0182°W	SO987981	
Anson Branch Junction	52.5775°N 2.0221°W	SO986977	Southern terminus at junction with Walsall Canal

== See also ==
- Canals of the United Kingdom
- History of the British canal system

== Bibliography ==
- Chester-Browne, Richard (1991). The Other Sixty Miles. Birmingham Canal Navigations Society.
- Hadfield, Charles (1985). The Canals of the West Midlands. David and Charles. ISBN 978-0-7153-8644-6.
- Nicholson (2006). Nicholson Guides Vol 2: Severn Avon and Birmingham. Harper Collins. ISBN 978-0-00-721110-4.
- Russell, Ronald (1971). Lost Canals of England and Wales. David and Charles. ISBN 978-0-7153-5417-9.
- Shead, Jim. "Anson Branch". Archived from the original on 1 July 2011.
- Shill, Ray (2011). "BCN Branches and Byeways: Ansons Branch". Boundary Post. 191. Birmingham Canal Navigations Society. Archived from the original on 1 October 2011.
