= Emmanuel Church, Bentley =

Emmanuel Church, Bentley, Walsall
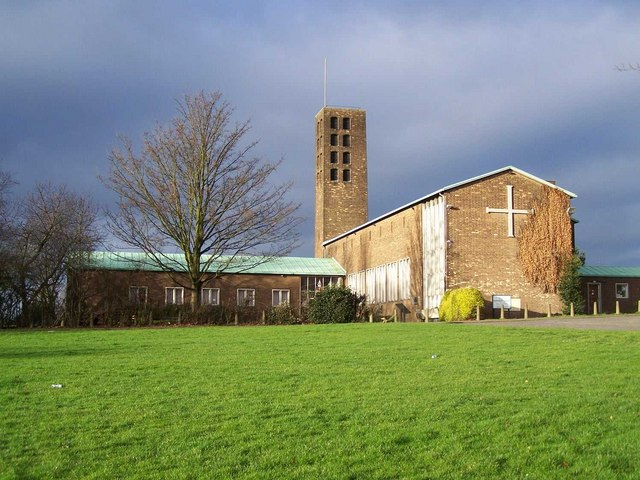
- Emmanuel Church, Bentley, Walsall
- Emmanuel Church, Bentley, Walsall
- 52°35′19.04″N 2°1′16.36″W
- OS grid reference: SO 98654 98977
- Location: Bentley, West Midlands
- Country: England
- Denomination: Church of England
- Website: emmanuelbentley.yolasite.com

History
- Dedication: Emmanuel
- Consecrated: 1956

Architecture
- Heritage designation: Grade II
- Designated: 10 March 2016
- Architect: Richard Twentyman
- Groundbreaking: 1954
- Completed: 1956

Administration
- Diocese: Diocese of Lichfield
- Archdeaconry: Walsall
- Deanery: Wulfrun
- Parish: Emmanuel Bentley

Emmanuel Church, Bentley is a parish church in the Church of England in Bentley, West Midlands.

== History ==
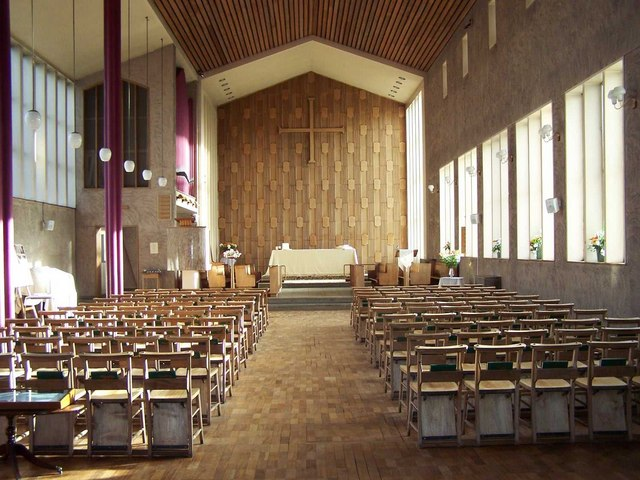
The nave and chancel

The church was started in 1954 by the architect Richard Twentyman with Lavender and Percy and consecrated in 1956 by Rt. Revd. Stretton Reeve the Bishop of Lichfield. It was built in memory of Alfred Ernest Owen. It was built of brick over a concrete frame. The bell tower is punctuated by asymmetrical openings. The chancel and sanctuary are lit with strongly vertical windows.

The building received praise from Pevsner who describes it as more accommodating and much prettier than their pre-war work. It was listed at Grade II by Historic England in March 2016.

== Organ ==
The church is equipped with a pipe organ by Hawkins dating from 1956. A specification of the organ can be found on the National Pipe Organ Register.
