= St Thomas' Church, Wednesfield =

St Thomas’ Church, Wednesfield
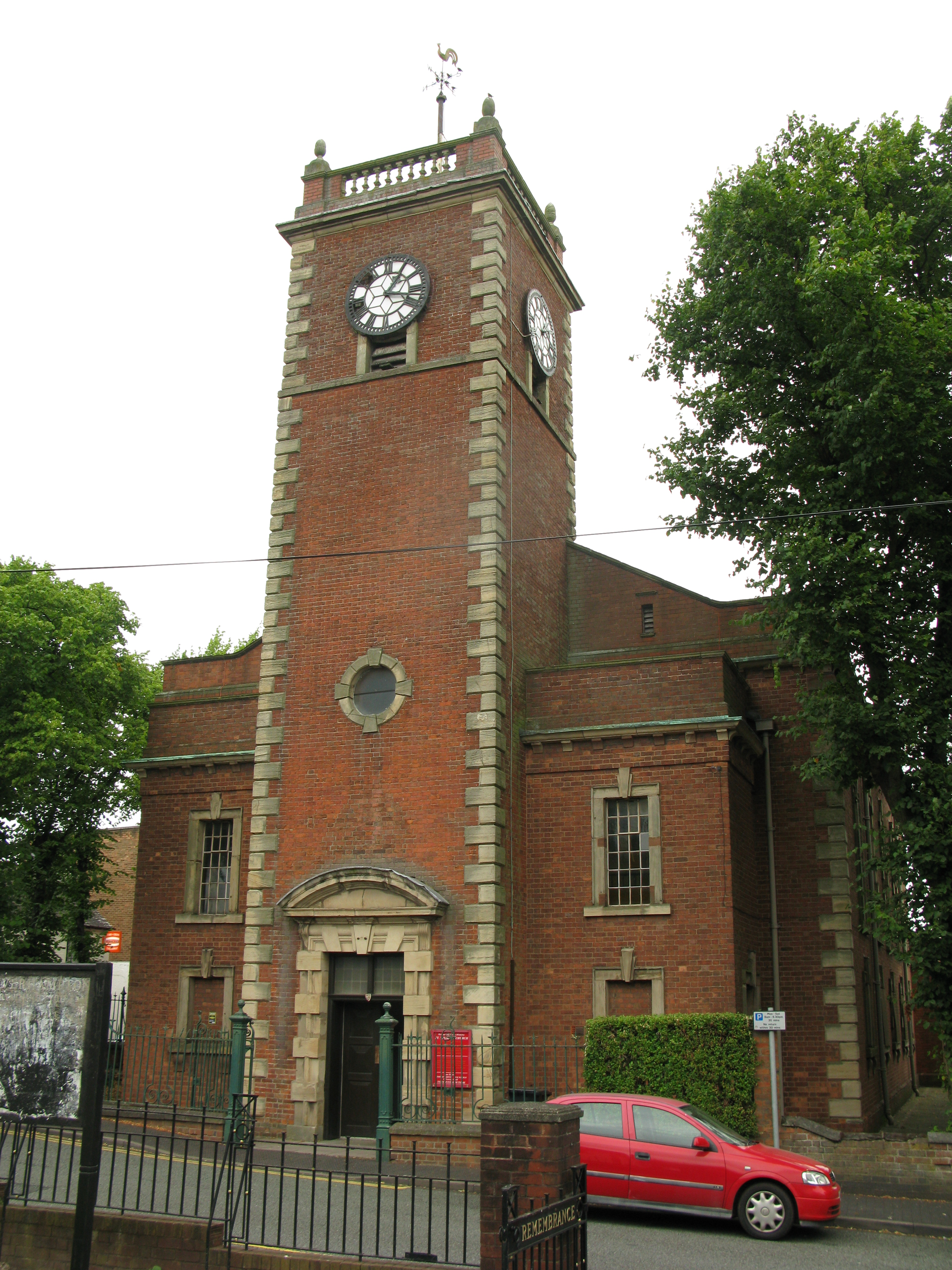
- St Thomas’ Church, Wednesfield
- St Thomas’ Church, Wednesfield
- 52°35′59.04″N 2°5′0.59″W
- OS grid reference: SJ 94443 00216
- Location: Wednesfield
- Country: England
- Denomination: Church of England
- Website: www.wednesfieldteam.org.uk

History
- Dedication: St Thomas
- Consecrated: August 1750

Architecture
- Heritage designation: Grade II listed
- Designated: February 1977

Administration
- Diocese: Diocese of Lichfield
- Archdeaconry: Walsall
- Deanery: Wulfrun
- Parish: Wednesfield

The Church of St Thomas is located in Wednesfield in Wolverhampton, West Midlands. It was originally consecrated in August 1750, as a chapel of ease of St. Peter's Collegiate Church, Wolverhampton and known as the Chapel of St. Thomas in Wednesfield. It became a separate parish in 1849.

The church was almost completely destroyed by fire on 18 January 1902, as a result of which the tower is the only remaining part of the original building. The church was reconstructed in similar style to the original and continues in active use as a place of worship, serving most of the town along with its sister church of St. Alban's, and with the neighbouring parish church of St. Gregory's.

Made from brick, with ashlar dressing, it was granted Grade II listed status in February 1977, legally protecting it from unauthorised demolition or alteration.
