= North Walsall railway station =

Former railway station in England

North Walsall
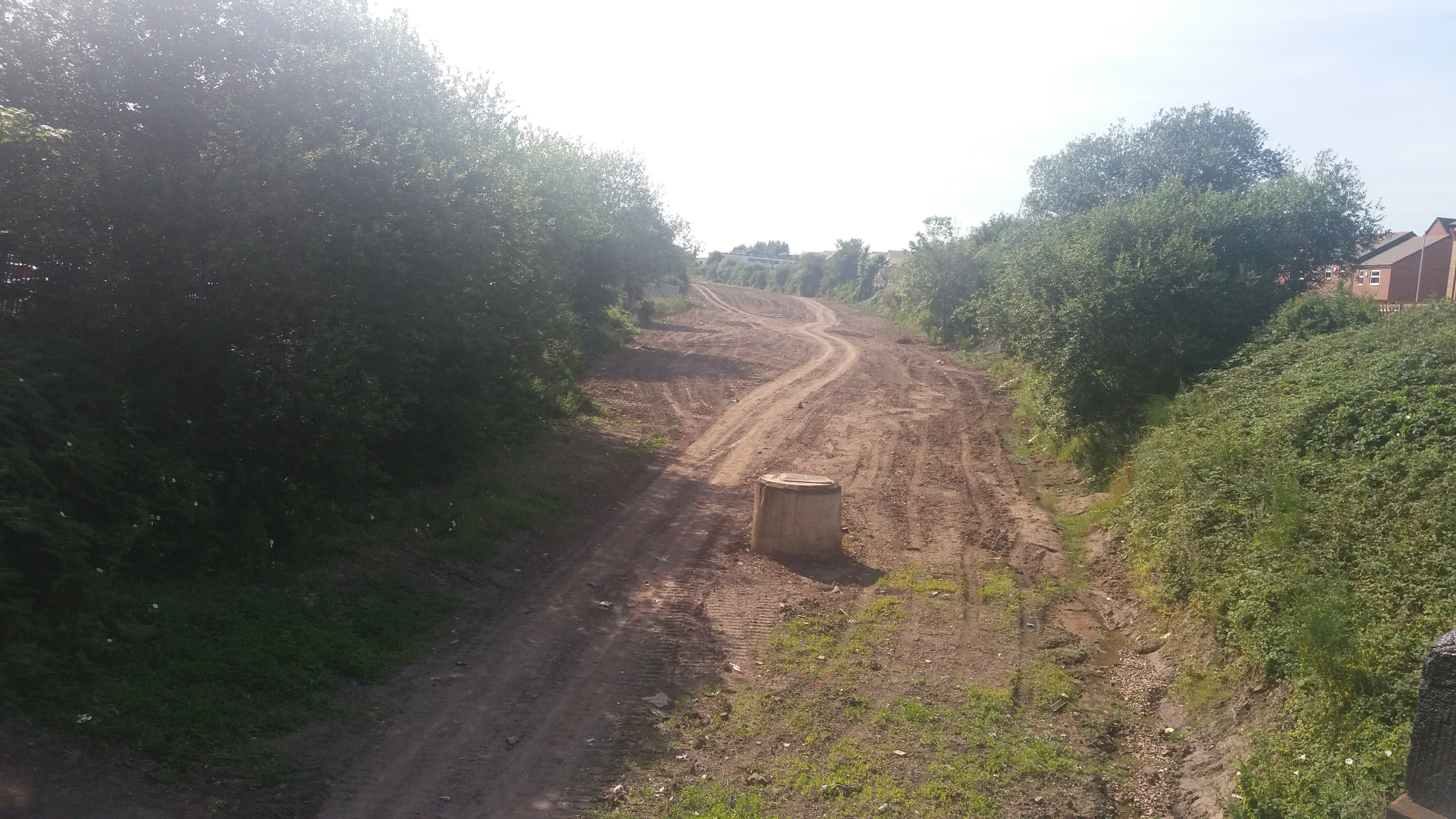

General information
- Location: Birchills and Leamore, Metropolitan Borough of Walsall; England
- Coordinates: 52.5977°N 1.9884°W
- Grid reference: SP008999
- Platforms: 2

Other information
- Status: Disused

History
- Original company: Wolverhampton and Walsall Railway
- Pre-grouping: Midland Railway
- Post-grouping: London, Midland and Scottish Railway

Key dates
- 1 November 1872: Opened
- 13 July 1925: Closed to passengers
Location

North Walsall railway station was a station built by the Wolverhampton and Walsall Railway in 1872, and was operated by the Midland Railway from 1876 onwards. It served the north Walsall areas of Birchills and Leamore. It was located west of Bloxwich Road in a cutting.

The station closed in 1925, although the railway serving it remained open for a further 57 years, serving Birchills Power Station until its closure in October 1982, when the line closed.

== Station site today ==
Due to decades of litter and fly tipping. A proposal was submitted to Walsall Council to fill in the cutting between Walsall and to the north of North Walsall (Near the present day Reedswood Retail Park).

Centro confirmed the plan and in late 2015/early 2016. Work began to fill in the cutting and remove a pedestrian overpass nearby. The site is now filled in with dirt and a very small section fenced off on both ends is used by walkers to cross over to the two nearby housing estates on both ends of the former trackbed. No evidence remains of the former North Walsall station other than the road bridges and the trackbed towards Bentley.

Preceding station	Disused railways	Following station
Bentley	Wolverhampton and Walsall Railway; Later Midland Railway	Walsall
Bentley	Midland Railway; Sutton Park Line	Aldridge

== See also ==
- List of closed railway stations in Britain
