= Walsall Rural District =

Local government area in the UK, abolished 1974

Coordinates: 52.60°N 1.91°W

Walsall was a rural district in Staffordshire, England from 1894 to 1934.

It was created by the Local Government Act 1894 based on Walsall rural sanitary district, and included the five parishes of Aldridge, Bentley, Great Barr, Pelsall and Rushall. Four of these parishes were to the east of Walsall, and Bentley was to the west, forming an exclave.

It was subject to increased urban development in the early 20th century and was abolished in 1934 under a County Review Order. The parish of Bentley was split between the urban district of Darlaston and the parish of Short Heath (which itself was becoming part of the Willenhall urban district), while the rest of the rural district became the Aldridge urban district, and since 1974 has formed part of the Metropolitan Borough of Walsall in the metropolitan county of West Midlands.
