= Willenhall Stafford Street railway station =

Former railway station in England

Willenhall Stafford Street
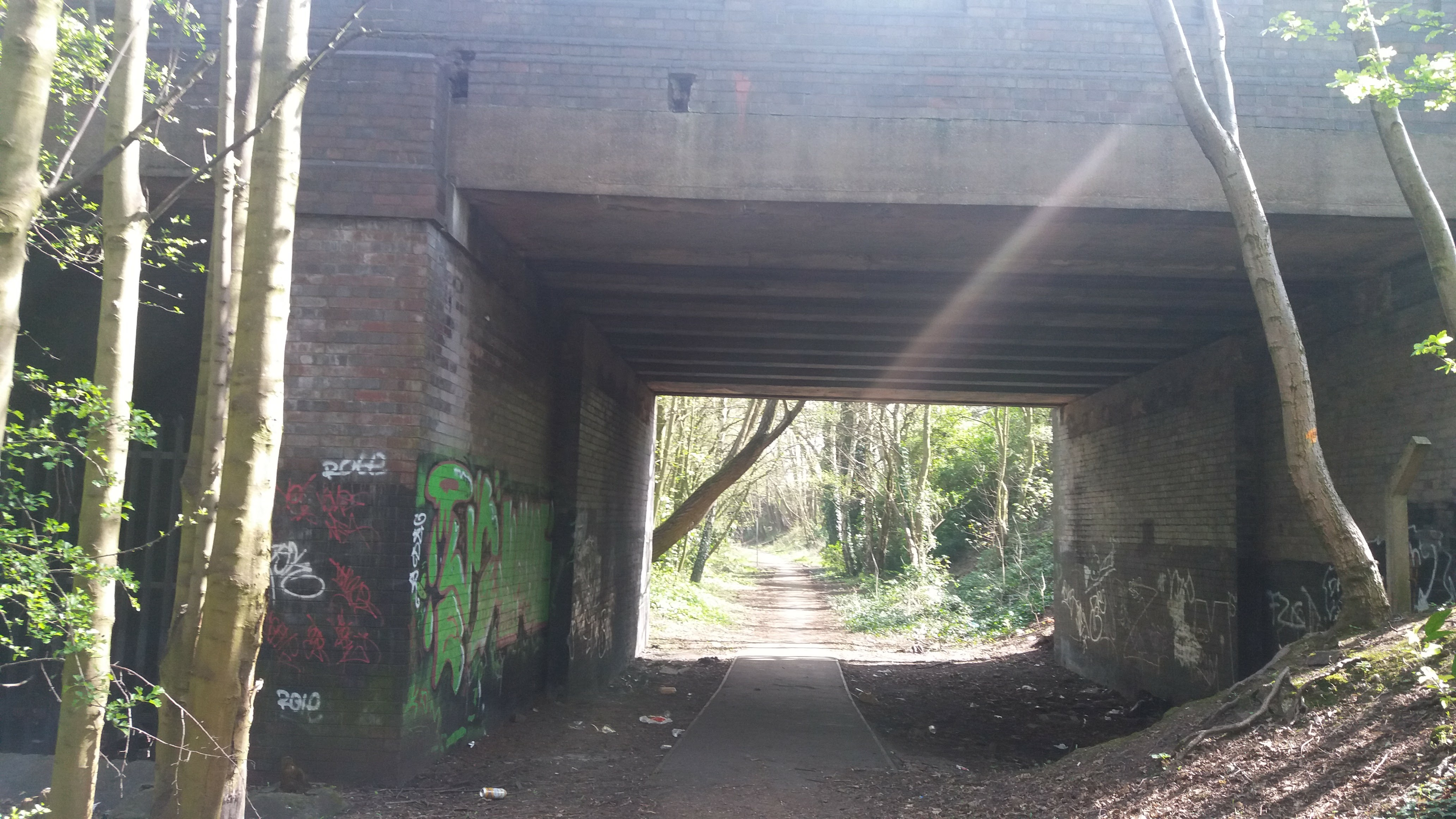

General information
- Location: Willenhall, Metropolitan Borough of Walsall; England
- Coordinates: 52.5879°N 2.0576°W
- Grid reference: SO961989
- Platforms: 2

Other information
- Status: Disused

History
- Original company: Wolverhampton and Walsall Railway
- Pre-grouping: Midland Railway
- Post-grouping: London, Midland and Scottish Railway

Key dates
- 1 November 1872: Opened
- 5 January 1931: Closed to passengers
- 4 October 1965: Closed
Location

Willenhall Stafford Street railway station was a station built by the Wolverhampton and Walsall Railway in 1872, and was operated by the Midland Railway from 1876 onwards. It served the town of Willenhall, and was located to the north of the town centre. It was originally named Willenhall Market Place.

It was one of two railway stations in the town - the other being Willenhall Bilston Street.

The station closed in 1931.

== Station site today ==
All railway-related bridges, overbridges and small relics remain in situ between Wednesfield and to the north of Willenhall Stafford Street and are now used by motors and pedestrians but the trackbed to the north towards Short Heath where the former over bridge carried onto an embankment is fenced off and heavily overgrown and is still visible on Stringes Lane 52.590474°N 2.044408°W.

| Preceding station | Disused railways | Following station |
|---|---|---|
| Wednesfield | Wolverhampton and Walsall Railway; Later Midland Railway | Short Heath |
