= Bentley railway station (West Midlands) =

Disused railway station in Bentley, West Midlands

Bentley
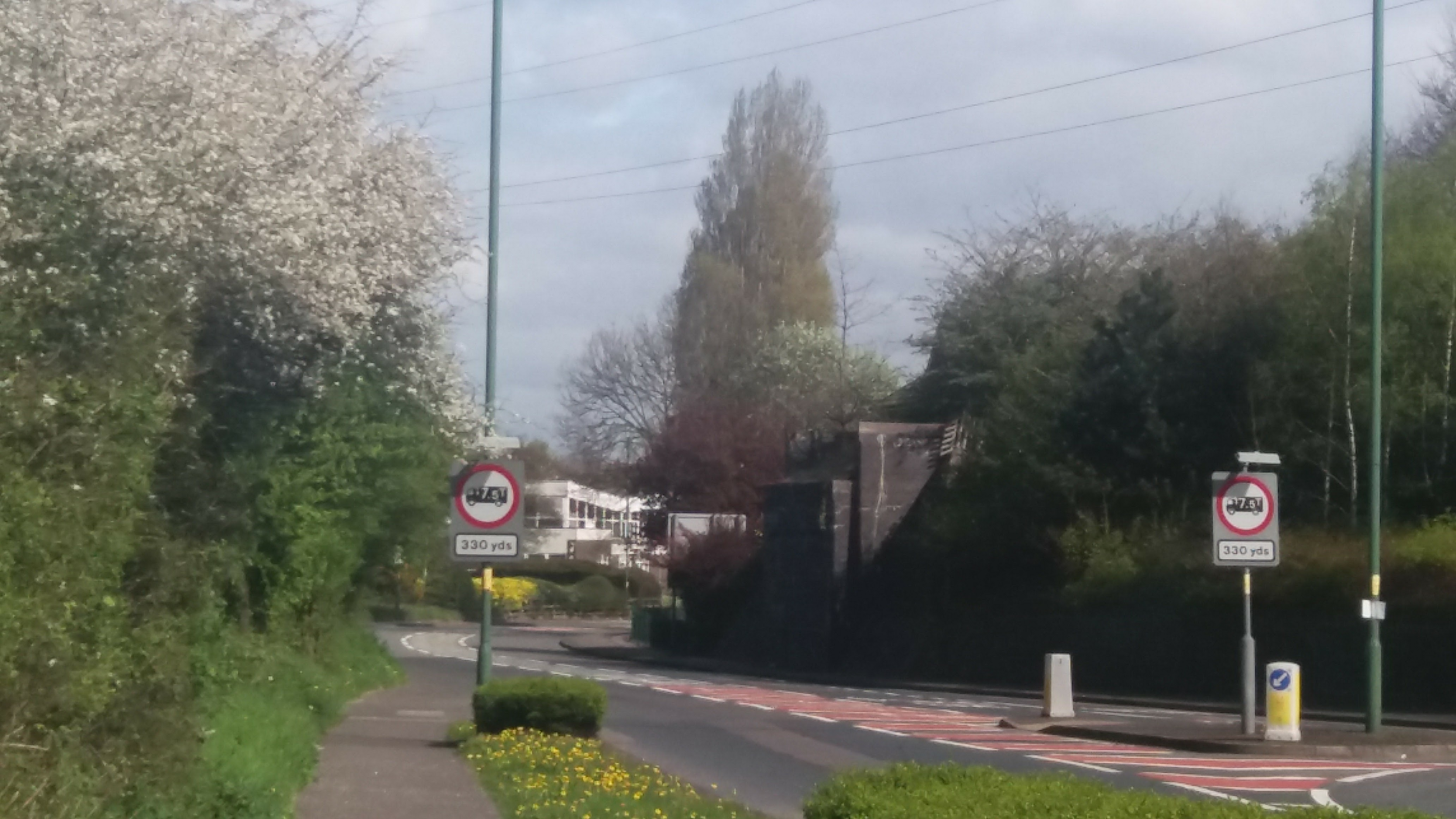

General information
- Location: Bentley, Metropolitan Borough of Walsall; England
- Coordinates: 52.5963°N 2.0150°W
- Grid reference: SO990998
- Platforms: 2

Other information
- Status: Disused

History
- Original company: Wolverhampton and Walsall Railway
- Pre-grouping: Midland Railway

Key dates
- 1 November 1872: Opened
- 1 October 1898: Closed to passengers
- 1964: The line from Bentley to Willenhall is closed following the building of the M6 Motorway
Location

Bentley railway station was a railway station built by the Wolverhampton and Walsall Railway in 1872, and was operated by the Midland Railway from 1876 onwards. Situated on Bloxwich Lane, it served the area of Bentley, located between Willenhall and Walsall in the English West Midlands (then in Staffordshire). The station closed in 1898.

== Station site today ==
The station site was obliterated in the 1960s due to the construction of the M6 near Walsall and Willenhall which was built directly through the site of the former Bentley station and caused closure of the Walsall-Wednesfield section of the Wolverhampton and Walsall Railway.

The site is now under the M6 Motorway near Junction 10 with the north side now a public footpath and the south side towards North Walsall now overgrown. The only evidence of the former railway are two removed bridge supports on Bloxwich Lane 52.596159°N 2.014545°W.

Preceding station	Disused railways	Following station
Short Heath	Wolverhampton and Walsall Railway; Later Midland Railway	North Walsall
