= Rushall Canal =

Canal in the West Midlands, England

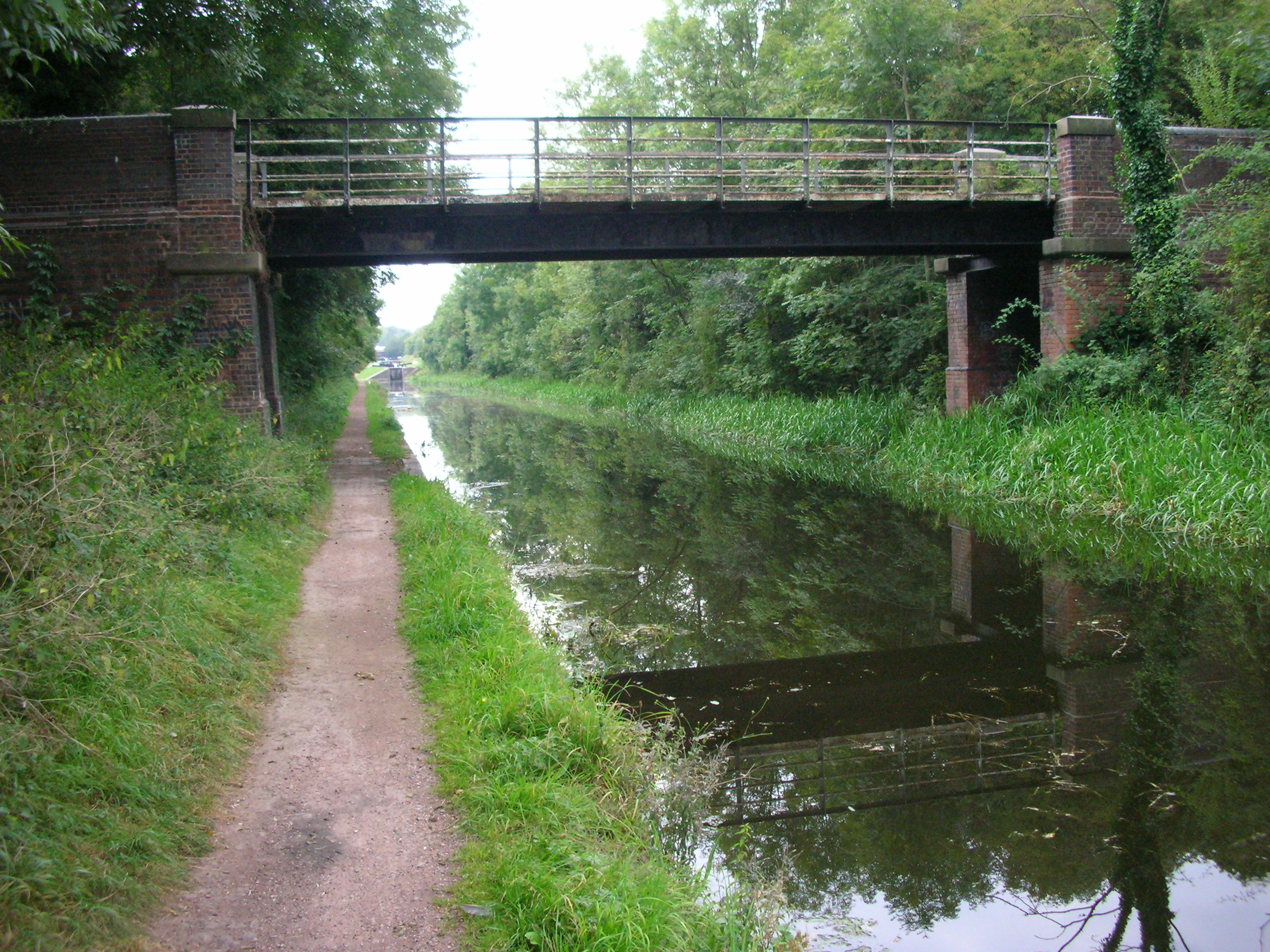
- Rushall bottom lock in distance

Specifications
- Locks: 9
- Status: Navigable

History
- Date of act: 1844

The Rushall Canal is a straight, 2.75-mile (4.43 km), narrow canal suitable for boats which are 7 feet (2.1 m) wide, forming part of the Birmingham Canal Navigations (BCN) on the eastern side of Walsall, West Midlands, England.

== Route ==
The Rushall Canal runs from Rushall Junction (which is within the triangle formed by the flyovers of the junction of the M5 and M6 motorways) on the Tame Valley Canal and climbs due north through nine locks to Longwood Junction at Hay Head, where it joins the 5.25-mile (8.45 km) long Daw End Branch, a meandering, lock-free branch of the Wyrley and Essington Canal (W&E) which joins the main W&E at Catshill Junction near Brownhills. A short, non-navigable, arm at Longwood Junction leads to Hay Head Nature Reserve, which was once an area of limestone mines.

== History ==
In 1839, the Birmingham Canal Navigations Act 1839 (2 & 3 Vict. c. lxi) was passed by Parliament, which authorised what became known as the Tame Valley Canal, joining the Danks Branch of the Walsall Canal to the Wyrley and Essington Canal at Salford Junction. Its construction began, with Messrs Walker and Burgess acting as engineers for the project. Soon afterwards, Walker and Burgess submitted a report which suggested major changes to the canal as authorised. These included continuing the canal beyond the Danks Branch to join the Walsall Canal at Toll End, moving the locations of the locks to create a flight at Perry Bar, and a link from the canal to the Daw End Branch of the Wyrley and Essington. This would require the construction of around 1 mile (1.6 km) of embankment, up to 40 feet (12 m) high. James Walker stated that although this was larger than any canal embankments that he knew, it was still not large when compared to those being built by railways.

The committee agreed that such changes would require a new bill to be submitted to Parliament. While this was being prepared, Walker suggested that starting the embankment further up the Tame valley would reduce the cost of construction considerably, and would make the junction with the Daw End Branch easier to construct. His plans were approved unanimously, and Mr Holland was appointed to manage the building of those parts of the canal which were not affected by the changes of plan. The new route was not popular with local landowners, and the committee decided not to submit the bill, but to continue with the canal as authorised. Walker wrote a long letter to the committee, expressing his outrage, and they reversed their decision. The bill became the Birmingham Canal Navigations Act 1840 (3 & 4 Vict. c. lvi) when it was passed on 4 June 1840.

In April 1842 the committee decided not to buy the land for the Rushall branch, the name given to the link to the Daw End Branch. The enabling act included a time limit, and if they failed to obtain the land by April 1843, the powers to build the canal would lapse. This created a legal problem, since they had borrowed money under the terms of the Wyrley and Essington Canal Navigation Act 1840 (3 & 4 Vict. c. xxiv), which had allowed the Wyrley and Essington to merge with the Birmingham Canal Navigations, and this money could only be used to build the Bentley Canal and the Rushall Canal. Failure to build the Rushall Canal would require £60,000 to be returned. The committee postponed making a decision, but borrowed £300,000 from the Bank of England.

With the opening of the Bentley Canal on 28 April 1843, and the Tame Valley Canal on 14 February 1844, two links between the Birmingham Canal Navigations and the Wyrley and Essington had been completed. The committee decided to submit a bill to give them even more borrowing powers, and to use the proceeds from the sale of land for the next three years to fund the Rushall Canal. The Birmingham Canal Navigations Act 1844 (7 & 8 Vict. c. xi) was the result, and plans for the canal were approved in April 1844. It was specified to be 36 feet (11 m) wide with towpaths on both sides. The towpaths were to be 9 feet (2.7 m) wide and the canal was finished in 1847.

The canal was 2.9 miles (4.7 km) long, and was built in the, then, county of Staffordshire. It ran from Rushall Junction on the Tame Valley Canal to Longwood Junction, where it joined the Daw End Branch. Only the towpath on the western bank of the canal was actually constructed. Nine locks dropped the level of the canal by 65 feet (20 m) from Longwood Junction to Rushall Junction. It enabled coal from Cannock mines to reach Birmingham and the Black Country more easily.

== Route ==
At its northern end, the canal begins at a junction with the Daw End Branch, which is just to the south of Longwood Bridge, by which the A454 Aldridge Road crosses the canal. The Hay Head Branch served limestone quarries, and was abandoned in 1954. A short stub of it is now used for moorings by Longwood Boat Club, who use a building by the top lock of the Rushall Canal as a club house. The rest of the branch is part of a local nature reserve, covering 17 acres (7 ha). It is also a designated Site of Importance for Nature Conservation (SINC) and a Site of Special Scientific Interest (SSSI) notable for its woodland, wetland and grassland habitats and the flora and fauna that they support.

Almost immediately, the Rushall Canal begins its descent, passing through Top Lock No.1 and Lock No.2. Calderfields Golf and Country Club occupies the west bank. At the southern end of the open area, Moat Bridge carries a track over the canal, followed by a Sutton Road Bridge carrying the B4151. The canal is flanked by gardens, but the towpath is bordered by willow trees, flowering currants and berberis. Gillity Bridge carries a public right of way after which the main flight of seven more locks begins. Five Ways Bridge is at the tail of Lock No.3, and Birmingham Road Bridge carries the A34 road across the canal between locks 4 and 5. Bell Bridge carries Walstead Road across the tail of Lock No.7, and the canal briefly enters open countryside again, with Lock No.8 and Lock No.9 sandwiched between Walsall Golf Club to the west and sports grounds to the east. Housing returns to the west bank, while Shustoke Bridge provides pedestrian access to the sports grounds. At the southern edge of the housing is Hill Farm Bridge, a single span cast iron bridge with brick and sandstone abutments. Its side panels have a lattice pattern of saltire crosses. It is grade II listed and the only listed structure on the canal.

Biddleston Bridge carries another track, and then the canal is overshadowed by a high viaduct carrying the M6 motorway, with the sliproads from the end of the M5 motorway crossing the Tame Valley Canal to join it. The final bridge is a towpath bridge as the canal joins the Tame Valley Canal at Rushall Junction.

== Points of interest ==
Point	Coordinates (Links to map resources)	OS Grid Ref	Notes
Longwood Junction	52.5904°N 1.9424°W	SP039991	Continues as the Daw End Branch
Rushall top lock 1	52.5895°N 1.9428°W	SP038991	
Rushall bottom lock 9	52.5629°N 1.9521°W	SP032961	
Rushall Junction	52.5504°N 1.9565°W	SP030947	

== See also ==
- Canals of the United Kingdom
- History of the British canal system

== Bibliography ==
- Broadbridge, S. R. (1974). The Birmingham Canal Navigations, Vol. 1 1768 – 1846. David & Charles. ISBN 978-0-7509-2077-3.
- Cumberlidge, Jane (2009). Inland Waterways of Great Britain (8th Ed.). Imray Laurie Norie and Wilson. ISBN 978-1-84623-010-3.
- Dean, Richard (1989). Historical map of the Birmingham Canals. M & M Baldwin. ISBN 978-0-947712-08-2.
- Nicholson (2014). Nicholson Guides Vol 2: Severn Avon and Birmingham. Harper Collins. ISBN 978-0-00-753898-0.
- Pearson, Michael (1989). Canal Companion – Birmingham Canal Navigations. J. M. Pearson & Associates. ISBN 978-0-907864-49-3.
