= Rushall Junction =

Canal junction

Coordinates: 52°33′01″N 1°57′23″W

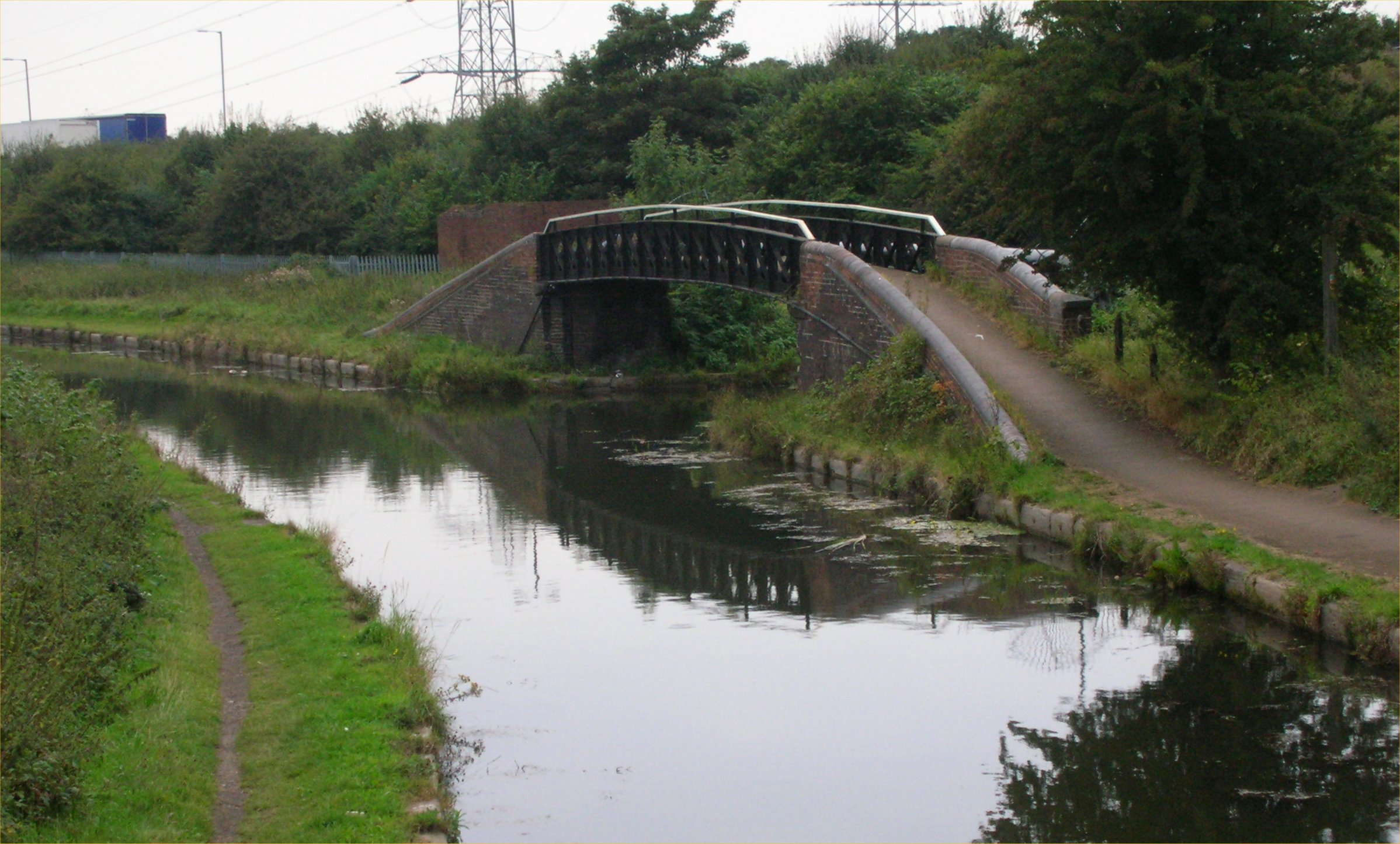
- Rushall Junction with the Rushall Canal leading northwards under the bridge on the right.

Specifications
- Status: Open
- Navigation authority: Canal & River Trust

History
- Date completed: 1847

Rushall Junction (or Newton Junction) (grid reference SP030947) is the southern limit of the Rushall Canal where it meets the Tame Valley Canal in the West Midlands, England. It opened in 1847, when the Rushall Canal was built to create connections between the Birmingham Canal Navigations system and the Wyrley and Essington Canal, following the amalgamation of the two companies in 1840.

== History ==
The Tame Valley Canal was built as part of a solution to the problem of congestion at Farmers Bridge Locks, where the Birmingham Canal Navigations main line ended and the Birmingham and Fazeley Canal began. The flight of 13 locks at the start of the Birmingham and Fazeley was the main link between the Birmingham system and the route to London via Aston Junction, the Digbeth Branch Canal and the Warwick and Birmingham Canal. The Tame Valley Canal, in conjunction with the Birmingham and Warwick Junction Canal, provided a northern bypass around the congestion. Both were authorised by Acts of Parliament on the same day, and both opened on 14 February 1844. The Tame Valley Canal ran from Tame Valley Junction on the Walsall Canal to Salford Junction on the Birmingham and Fazeley. The Birmingham and Warwick Junction Canal was a short link between Salford Junction and the Warwick and Birmingham Canal at Bordesley Junction. It included the five Garrison Locks, which saved boats from having to ascend the eleven locks of the Aston flight, and descend the six of the Ashted flight on the Digbeth Branch. The route from Salford Junction to Warwick and on to London became part of the Grand Union Canal in 1929.

Following the amalgamation of the Wyrley and Essington Canal and the Birmingham Canal Navigations in 1840, a number of links between the two systems were constructed. A flight of locks at Walsall joined the Walsall Canal to Birchills Junction, and once the Tame Valley Canal was open, work started on the Rushall Canal, to connect it to the southern end of the Daw End Branch of the Wyrley and Essington at Longwood Junction. It was opened in 1847, and included nine locks, a flight of seven near the middle with two more just before the end-on junction at Longwood, which raised the level of the canal by 65 feet (20 m).

== Location ==
From the junction, the Tame Valley Canal heads westwards, running alongside the M6 motorway for about 0.5 miles (0.80 km), before the two diverge, and the canal crosses the M5 motorway western slip road and a railway line on aqueducts. It is level for 3.5 miles (5.6 km) to its junction with the Walsall Canal at Tame Valley Junction. In the other direction, the canal heads to the south east, passing under a towpath bridge and the eastern sliproads of the M5 motorway. It reaches the top lock of the 13-lock Perry Barr flight, which drops the level of the canal by 106 feet (32 m) after 2.2 miles (3.5 km). The Tame Valley Canal has towpaths on both banks for most of its length.

The Rushall Canal heads northwards, under a towpath bridge, and almost immediately under the M6 motorway. The towpath is on the western bank, and the canal is level for 0.9 miles (1.4 km) to the bottom of the Rushall locks. After the motorway, there are three accommodation bridges, the third of which, Hill Farm Bridge, is a grade II listed structure. It is made of cast iron with abutments of brick and sandstone, and the balustrades consist of a latticework of saltire crosses. The footbridge to the east of the junction is of a similar design, and is also listed.

== See also ==
- Canals of the United Kingdom
- History of the British canal system

== Bibliography ==
- Cumberlidge, Jane (2009). Inland Waterways of Great Britain (8th Ed.). Imray Laurie Norie and Wilson. ISBN 978-1-84623-010-3.
- Hadfield, Charles (1970). The Canals of the East Midlands. David and Charles. ISBN 0-7153-4871-X.
- Nicholson (2006). Nicholson Guide Vol 2 - Severn, Avon & Birmingham. Harper Collins. ISBN 978-0-00-721110-4.
- Nicholson (2003). Nicholson Guide Vol 3 - Birmingham & the Heart of England. Harper Collins. ISBN 0-00-713666-8.
- Pearson, Michael (1989). Canal Companion - Birmingham Canal Navigations. J. M. Pearson & Associates. ISBN 0-907864-49-X.
- Shill, Ray (2002). The Birmingham Canal Navigations. Tempus Publishing. ISBN 978-0-7524-2767-6.
