= Bentley Bridge =

- Location: Wednesfield, Wolverhampton, West Midlands, England
- Coordinates: 52.597°N 2.090°W
- Developer: Clowes Developments
- Owner: Land Securities (Leisure) – AXA Real Estate Investment Management (Retail)
- Num. of stores: 23+
- Floor area: Leisure park = 98,973 sq ft. Retail park = 190,319 sq ft. 70,000 sq ft. Sainsbury's store
- Floors: 1–2
- Parking: 727
- Website: bentleybridge.co.uk

Bentley Bridge Leisure Park is an extensive modern leisure/retail park located in the village of Wednesfield, Wolverhampton in the West Midlands. It has been developed since the late 1990s, to the south of Wednesfield town centre.

The park is split into two halves − a leisure area and a shopping area.

The site is bounded by the Wyrley and Essington Canal and New Cross Hospital to the North and West, the recently built Wolverhampton Swimming and Fitness Centre to the South and Wednesfield Town to the East, which is easily accessed via a village link, consisting of an open plan amphitheatre style square, landscaped lawns and the newly built Wednesfield library.

The first retailer to open was The Co-operative Food (owned by the then West Midlands Co-operative Society) but this was sold to Sainsbury's a few years later who subsequently expanded and refurbished the store.

== History ==
In 2009, a plan was made to develop land adjacent to the Leisure park, which saw the creation of Bentley Bridge Business Park. Units range from 5,000 to 33,000 sq ft (460 to 3,070 m^{2}). Tenants include: Euro Carparts, Tool Station, Donghua (UK) Ltd, Wolverhampton City Primary Care Trust, Principal Hygiene Systems and a Mercedes Van and Truck dealership.

TK Maxx opened a department store on the retail park on 27 October 2011, replacing its decade-old city centre store which had closed the previous day.

In late 2014, Costa Coffee opened a new store in a previously vacant unit near Cosmo and B & M.

Many of the shops have been swapped around many times. For example, the Home Bargains is now where the Argos used to be.

Sometime in the early 2020s, a Starbucks was erected near the PureGym. This Starbucks has reported record profits for the company. Many people consider it as one of the most popular places in the retail park.

== Stores ==
=== Main stores ===
- Cineworld
- Hollywood Bowl
- Boots
- Aldi
- Dreams
- Sports Direct
- Next
- Home Bargains
- B & M
- Superdrug
- Card Factory
- Peacocks
- Hobbycraft
- Pure Gym
- TK Maxx
- JD Sports
- Just for Pets

=== Restaurants and Cafés ===
- Bella Italia
- Subway
- Nandos
- McDonald's
- KFC
- Starbucks
- Wagamama
