= Wednesfield =

Town in the West Midlands, England

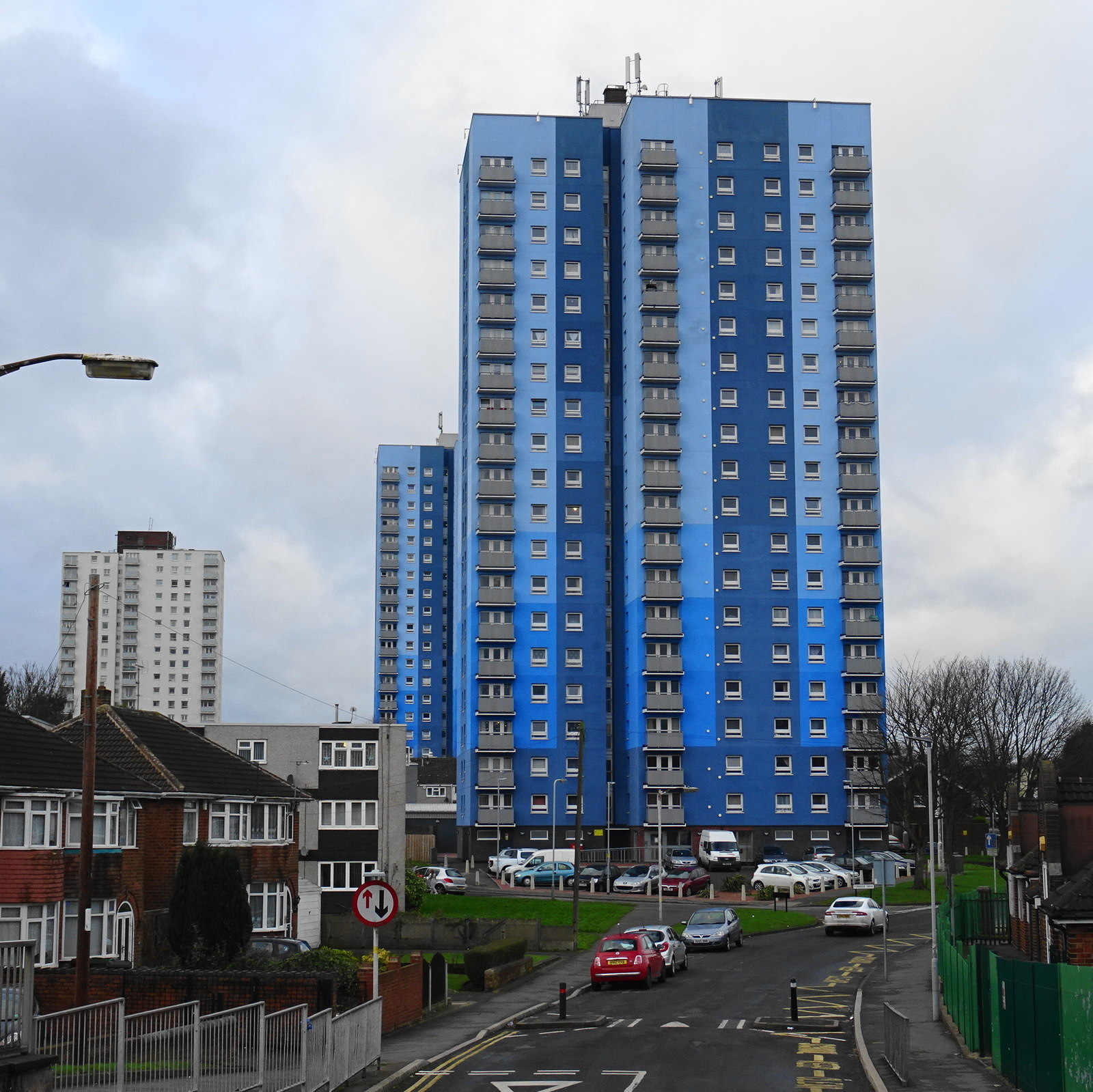
- High-rises in Wednesfield, seen from Graiseley Lane.

- Location within the West Midlands
- Population: 22,646 (2011 Census Wards)
- OS grid reference: SO944998
- Metropolitan borough: Wolverhampton
- Metropolitan county: West Midlands
- Region: West Midlands
- Country: England
- Sovereign state: United Kingdom
- Post town: WOLVERHAMPTON
- Postcode district: WV11
- Dialling code: 01902
- Police: West Midlands
- Fire: West Midlands
- Ambulance: West Midlands
- UK Parliament: Wolverhampton North East

Wednesfield (/ˈwɛnz.fiːld/) is a town and historic village in the City of Wolverhampton, in the county of the West Midlands, England; it was historically within the county of Staffordshire. It is 2 miles (3.2 km) east-north-east of Wolverhampton city centre and about 10 miles (16 km) from Birmingham. Local areas include Ashmore Park and Wood End. There is a formal garden at Wednesfield Park.

== Toponymy ==
Its name comes from the Old English Wōdnesfeld, meaning "Woden's field", open land belonging to, or holy to, the high god of the Germanic Pantheon.

== History ==
On 5 August 910, the allied forces of Mercia and Wessex defeated an army of Northumbrian Vikings in the Battle of Tettenhall (sometimes called the Battle of Wednesfield or Wōdnesfeld).

Wednesfield was formerly known for making all kinds of traps, from mousetraps to mantraps and locks. Many of the factories that dominated the area have been cleared to make way for houses and other buildings.

Historical population of Wednesfield
Year	1801	1811	1821	1831	1841	1851	1861	1871	1881	1891	1901	1911	1921	1931	1939	1951	1961	2001
Population	1,088	1,248	1,468	1,879	3,168	4,858	8,553	8,998	10,801	14,538	4,883	6,488	7,446	9,330	14,894	17,418	33,048	33,555
Township 1801–1891 • Urban District 1901–1961 • LANA 2001

=== Transport history ===
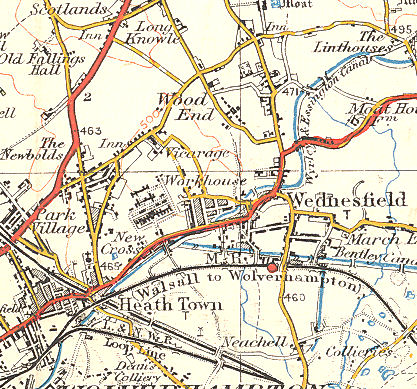
Map of Wednesfield in 1921

The first railway within the township was the Grand Junction Railway, where Wednesfield Heath railway station (opened in 1837) was the primary station for Wolverhampton, and was located on Station Road, Heath Town. The station was replaced by Wolverhampton High Level in the city centre, and closed to passengers in 1873 whilst remaining open for goods traffic until 1965. The siting of this station at Heath Town has been cited as a reason for the separation of Wednesfield and Heath Town.

Wednesfield railway station on the Wolverhampton and Walsall Railway was opened in 1872, connecting the town with Wolverhampton High Level and Walsall. It was operated by the Midland Railway, and was located on Neachells Lane to the south of the town centre. It closed to passenger traffic in 1931, although it remained open for goods traffic until the 1980s.

The Wyrley and Essington Canal running through the town was opened in 1797. It was constructed to allow coal traffic to travel between mines near Great Wyrley and Wolverhampton, and was constructed following the contours of the land. This meant that the centre of the town was surrounded on three sides by the canal and that almost all of the pre-existing roads required hump-backed bridges. Despite the improvement in communications and the potential for transporting goods via the canal, it is recorded that some local residents felt that it actually obstructed the development of the town, rather than assisting it.

A second canal through the town, the Bentley Canal, opened in 1843 between Wednesfield Junction, near the modern New Cross Hospital, and Walsall. The canal was abandoned in the 1960s, and only a short section at Wednesfield Junction is extant.

== Geography ==
Wednesfield lies at 52°35′59″N 2°04′58″W (52.5998°, −2.0827°) and is located to the north-east of Wolverhampton city centre on the northern fringe of the West Midlands conurbation. It was historically part of the county of Staffordshire and, since 1974, has been part of the West Midlands metropolitan county.

The south of the town lies over coal measures whilst the town centre has dolerite deposits; the area to the north lies over mudstone and sandstone. The town lies on generally flat land between 130m and 140m above sea level, rising to around 170m in the north.

There are no navigable rivers within the town, although the original course of the River Tame crossed the south-east of the town.

== Governance ==
The coat of arms of the former Wednesfield Urban District Council

Following the Poor Law Amendment Act 1834, Wednesfield formed part of the Wolverhampton Poor Law Union, an inter-parish unit established to provide social security. This replaced an earlier arrangement where the Parish had operated a workhouse on Old Heath Road since 1723. In 1863, the Wednesfield Local Board of Health was established. With reference to the Local Government Act 1858, it was a regulatory body responsible for standards of hygiene and sanitation in the township; it replaced an earlier Sanitary Committee that was established in 1856. The Local Board was only in existence for three years before being split into two, one for Wednesfield itself and one for Wednesfield Heath.

Wednesfield was formerly a township in the parish of Wolverhampton; in 1866, Wednesfield became a separate civil parish.

Following the Local Government Act 1894, the rump of the parish (minus Wednesfield Heath and part of what became Short Heath Urban District) became an urban district within the administrative county of Staffordshire.

Partition of Wednesfield Urban District in 1966
	Population	Area (acres)
Wednesfield UD	33,048	1,018
Wolverhampton CB	32,798	812
Walsall CB	215	36
Cannock RD	35	170
Source: Vision of Britain

With the exception of a loss of 24 acres (with a census population of 224) to the County Borough of Wolverhampton in 1933, the Urban District remained intact until 1 April 1966; this is when most of the Wednesfield Urban District was merged into Wolverhampton County Borough, due to the provisions of the Local Government Act 1958. However, some parts were incorporated into Walsall County Borough and others into Cannock Rural District, now part of South Staffordshire district.

The parish was also abolished on 1 April 1966 and merged with Wolverhampton, Essington and Walsall. In 1961 the parish had a population of 33,048.

In the early 1950s, when Wednesfield was still independent from its larger neighbour, Wolverhampton council developed two overspill estates – Ashmore Park and Long Knowle – in Wednesfield to rehouse families from slums in the town.

For electoral purposes, Wednesfield is represented by the wards of Wednesfield North, Wednesfield South and Fallings Park, which together make up the Wednesfield and Fallings Park LANA (Local Area and Neighbourhood Arrangements).

It is part of the Wolverhampton North East constituency; Sureena Brackenridge, a member of the Labour Party, became the MP following the 2024 general election.

== Religion ==
The Church of St Thomas is located in the town centre. It was originally consecrated in August 1750, as a chapel of ease of St. Peter's Collegiate Church, Wolverhampton and known as the Chapel of St. Thomas in Wednesfield. It became a separate parish in 1849. It was almost completely destroyed by fire on 18 January 1902, as a result of which the tower is the only remaining part of the original building. The church was reconstructed in similar style to the original and continues in active use as a place of worship.

The Guru Nanak Gurdwara was opened in 1979 and is also located in the town centre, and caters for the local Sikh community, many of whom are descendants of those who immigrated to the area in the 1950s and onwards. A part of the Gurdwara suffered fire damage in 2002 so the committee decided to demolish the original building and the rebuild was ready by 2004. It has lifts for the elderly.

== Economy ==
Economic status of residents
2001 UK Census	Wednesfield	Wolverhampton (borough)
Full-time	39.4%	37.5%
Part-time	12.7%	11.3%
Unemployed	3.9%	5.3%
Other Active	7.2%	8.0%
Inactive	37.0%	37.8%
Source: Wolverhampton City Council

Wednesfield Village, or "the village" as it is still referred to by many residents, provides a range of shopping, office and community facilities for residents. These are in the north-east of Wolverhampton and some adjoining parts of the Metropolitan Borough of Walsall, along with services for the major industrial areas to the south of the town and New Cross Hospital. To the west of the town centre, there is a large Sainsbury's supermarket and the Bentley Bridge Retail Park. There is also a retail market.

Bentley Bridge consistes of both leisure and retail components. The leisure component is in the form of a multiplex cinema and bowling alley, together with fast food outlets, a pub and numerous restaurants; there is 14,700 m^{2} of retail space which includes a fitness gym.

The proximity to Wolverhampton city centre has been a major constraint on retail economic growth within the town. Wednesfield is part of a network of lower order Black Country town centres, providing principally convenience shopping facilities for a local catchment area and it is surrounded by centres with a similar role including Bilston to the south, Willenhall to the south-east and Bloxwich to the east.

However, since 2009, the Bentley Bridge Retail Park has thrived with empty units being filled by national retailers. In September 2011, retailer TK Maxx announced plans to close its city centre store in Wolverhampton and relocate to Bentley Bridge. Whilst the retail park thrives, local independent traders on the high street continue to suffer due to economic circumstances.

The area to the south of the former railway line is characterised by industrial development, mostly with small units although there is some larger development such a steel processing and distribution plant. Historically, the main industries were coal mining and trap making, although mining ceased in the area in the early twentieth century.

== Transport ==
Public transport in Wednesfield is co-ordinated by Transport for West Midlands.

Most bus services within the town are operated by National Express West Midlands, with services from the town centre to destinations including Wolverhampton city centre, Bilston, Bloxwich, Walsall and Willenhall. Key routes include:

- 9, by National Express West Midlands operates between Walsall, Pelsall, Bloxwich and Wolverhampton
- 59, which runs from Wolverhampton city centre to Ashmore Park, via New Cross Hospital and Wednesfield High Street, is the most frequent in the city. Both National Express West Midlands and Travel Express operate on this route.
- 65, by Diamond Bus provides an hourly service between Wolverhampton and Fordhouses via New Cross Hospital and Bushbury Crematorium
- 71, by Chaserider (previously Arriva), provides an hourly link to Essington, Great Wyrley and Cannock

An extension of the West Midlands Metro through Wednesfield is planned, on the 5Ws route from Wolverhampton to Wednesbury, via Willenhall and Walsall.

Much of the trackbed of the former Wolverhampton and Walsall Railway was reused for the A4124 Wednesfield Way, which bypasses the town centre and opened in 1999.

== Notable people ==
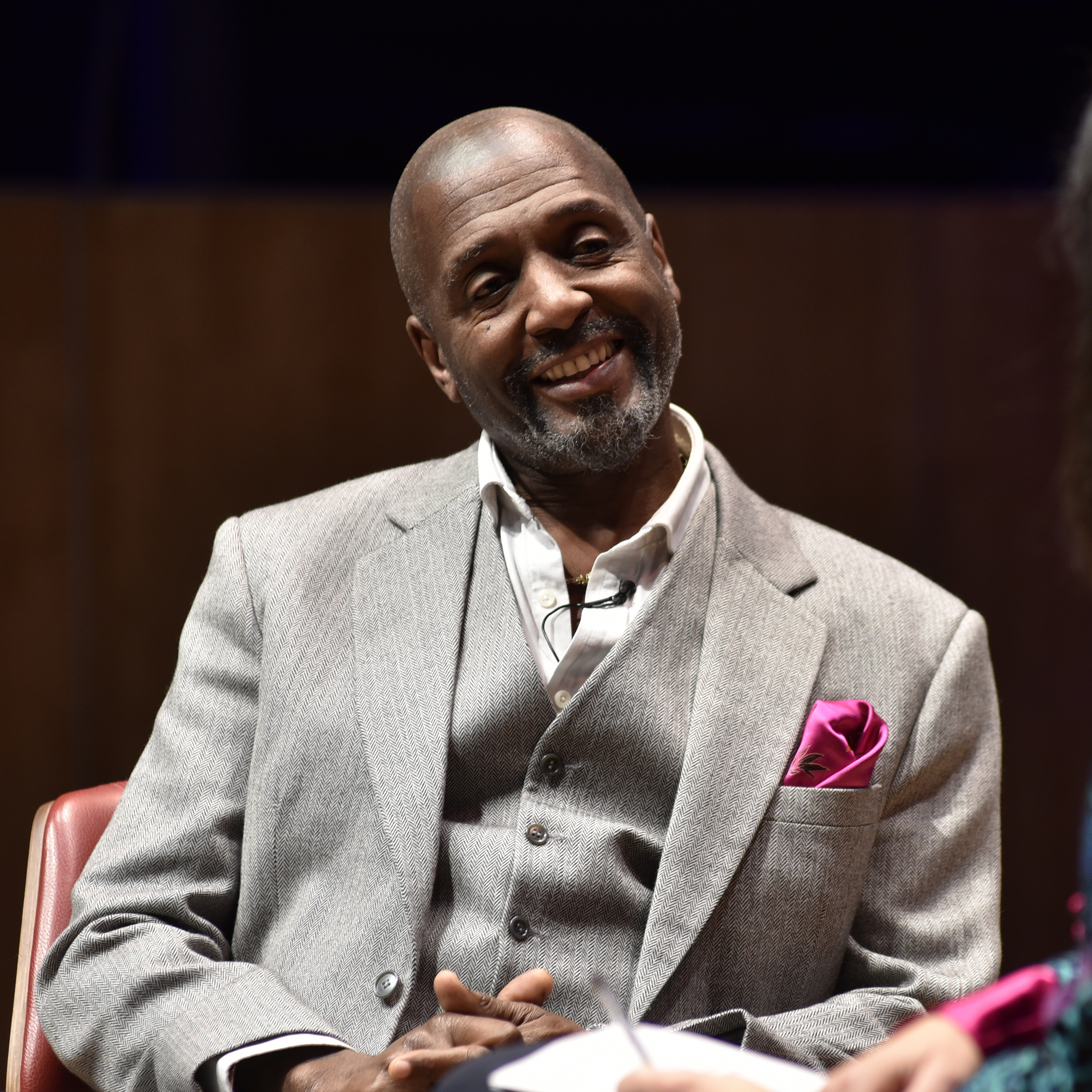
Willard Wigan, 2019

- Mary Whitehouse CBE (1910–2001) TV/radio clean-up campaigner, taught at local Lichfield Road school 1932–40
- David Inshaw (born 1943), artist who painted The Badminton Game, now in the Tate Gallery
- Kevin Rowland (born 1953), musician and frontman of Dexys Midnight Runners
- Willard Wigan MBE (born 1957), microsculpter, who holds the Guinness World Record for the smallest sculpture.
- Roy Rickhuss CBE (born 1960), trade union leader with the Iron and Steel Trades Confederation
- Sureena Brackenridge (born 1975), Labour MP for Wolverhampton North East since 2024.
- Ruth Badger (born 1978), businesswoman educated locally, runner-up on the second series of The Apprentice
- Tom Aspaul (born 1986), singer, songwriter and producer

=== Sport ===
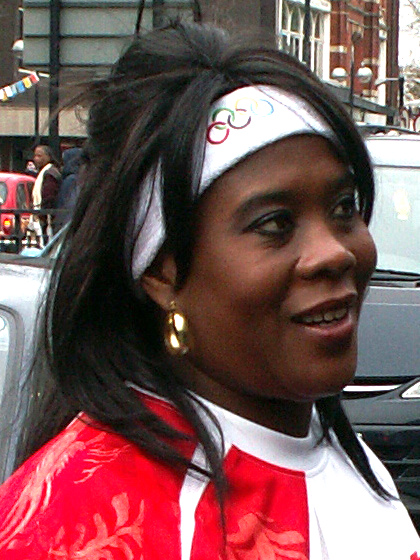
Tessa Sanderson, 2010

- Hill Griffiths (1871–1937) footballer who played 161 games for Wolves
- Eddie Clamp (1934–1995), footballer who played 294 games including 214 for Wolves
- John Sleeuwenhoek (1944–1989), footballer who played 226 games for Aston Villa F.C.
- Dave Wilson (born 1944), footballer, played 303 games including 128 for Chesterfield F.C.
- Martin Cooper (born 1948), England rugby union player with 11 caps
- John Cosnett (1951–2018), darts player, known as "Cossie"
- Tessa Sanderson CBE (born 1956), brought up locally, javelin thrower, gold medallist at the 1984 Summer Olympics
- Wayne Jones (born 1965), darts player with the Professional Darts Corporation
- Hayley Price (born 1966) gymnast, participated at the 1984 Summer Olympics
- Kristian Thomas (born 1989), artistic gymnast, team bronze medallist at the 2012 Summer Olympics
- Jordan Cranston (born 1993), footballer who has played over 280 games, currently playing for AFC Telford United
