= Midland Railway branches around Walsall =

The Midland Railway branches around Walsall were built to give the Midland Railway independent access to Wolverhampton, and to a colliery district at Brownhills. The Midland Railway had a stake in the South Staffordshire Railway giving it access to Walsall, and the Wolverhampton and Walsall Railway (W&WR) was opened in 1872. At first the W&WR was independent and neutral, but it was acquired by the London and North Western Railway (LNWR), and then sold by that company to the Midland Railway.

The South Staffordshire Railway too was acquired by the LNWR and the Midland Railway's rights over it were uncertain. The Midland company sponsored the Wolverhampton, Walsall and Midland Junction Railway (WW&MJR), running east from Walsall to join the Midland Railway main line at Water Orton. It opened in 1879. A Brownhills branch line was opened from a junction on the WW&MJR line in 1882.

Although the Midland Railway got its desired access to Wolverhampton, the LNWR developed a network of lines that dominated the area, and the Midland never established itself, although it did open its own goods station at Wolverhampton. The W&WR section closed completely in 1965 and the WW&MJR section lost its passenger service in 1965, although it remains open for freight traffic and occasional special passenger trains.

== Black Country industry ==
Wolverhampton, Walsall and the Black Country had been active in industry since well before the beginning of the nineteenth century. This was due to many factors, including the availability of raw materials, transport facilities on rivers and, later, canals, and relative freedom of employment. Iron production, and non-ferrous metal production were dominant, but many other industries were supported, including leather and glass, pottery, and for a time calico printing, although this last was not successful locally in the long term. There were extensive coal deposits near the surface, with iron ore and beds of fire clay.

A particular feature was specialist work, where companies provided components and raw materials to manufacturers elsewhere, who then assembled a finished product. For that reason, local transport within the area became increasingly important.

== First railways ==
The first modern railway in the area was the Grand Junction Railway, which opened its line in 1837, running from a station in Birmingham to Warrington, connecting on to Manchester and Liverpool. Its somewhat roundabout route passed near, but not through, Walsall and Wolverhampton, both of them important industrial towns. (Note: Wolverhampton became a city in 2001.) Neither place was given a convenient station. There was a Walsall station, well over a mile from the centre of the town, and there was a Wolverhampton station, a mile from the town centre.

In 1846 the London and North Western Railway (LNWR) was formed by amalgamation of the Grand Junction Railway, the London and Birmingham Railway and the Manchester and Birmingham Railway. At once in control of a large geographical area, the LNWR set about expanding its network and deepening its control, in many cases by the use of affiliated local companies.

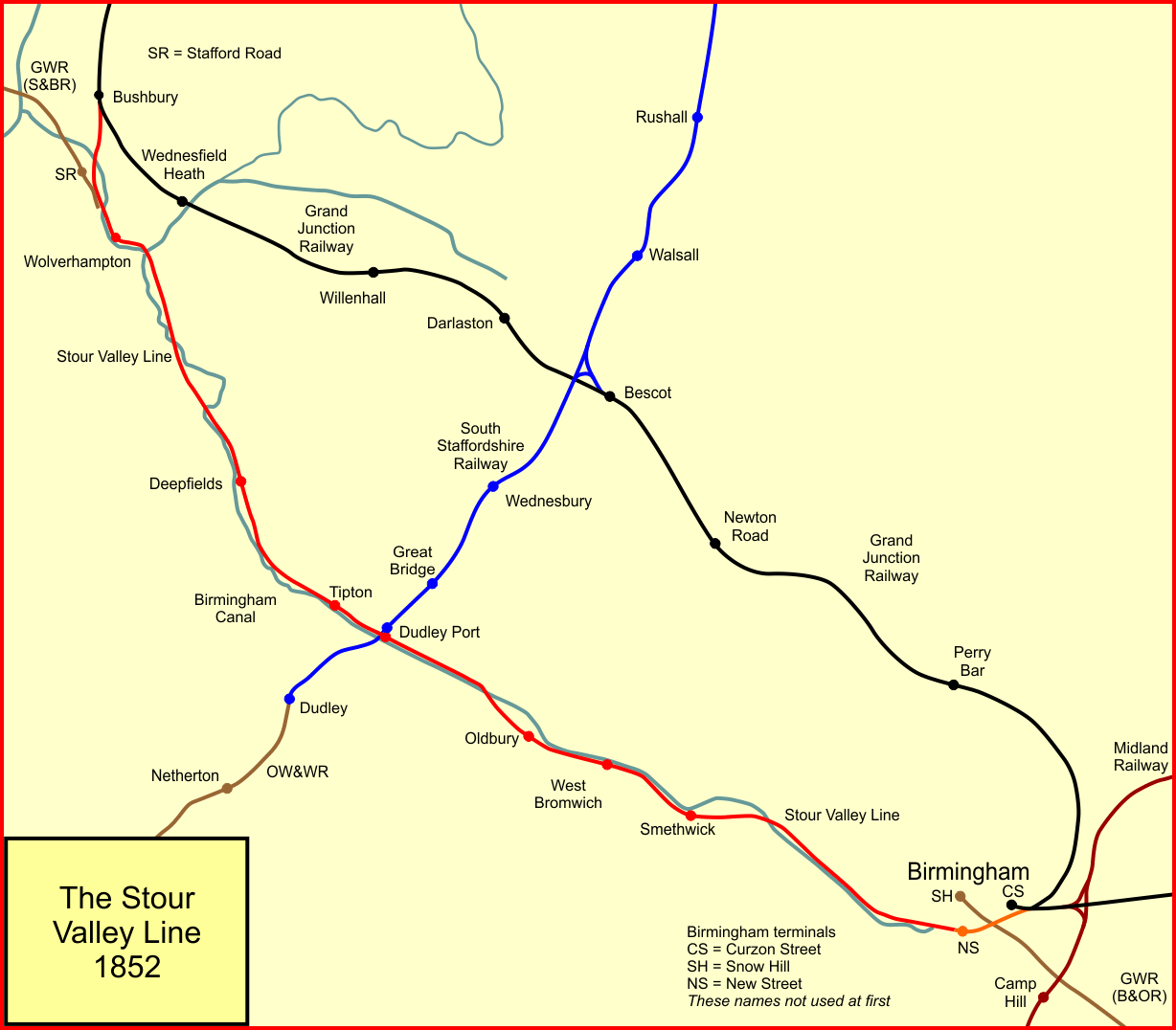
The Stour Valley Line and the Grand Junction route

The LNWR sponsored a nominally independent company called the Birmingham, Wolverhampton and Stour Valley Railway (BW&SVR); it was incorporated in 1846 and it was to build a direct line from Birmingham through Tipton to Wolverhampton, joining the old Grand Junction Railway route at Bushbury, north-west of Wolverhampton. The route became known as the Stour Valley Line. A new central station called New Street station was to be built in Birmingham. The BW&SVR was substantially completed in 1852 and immediately leased in perpetuity to the LNWR. It gave Wolverhampton a proper station, served directly from Birmingham. The Birmingham station was completed later, in 1854.

The Midland Railway was formed in 1844 by amalgamation of earlier lines. It too had a large network and it too sought to expand its territory. In the Birmingham area it had a line north-eastwards to Burton upon Trent and Derby, and another south-westwards to Gloucester; these routes passed Birmingham on the eastern side, with an inconveniently located terminal at Lawley Street.

== Connecting Walsall: the South Staffordshire Railway ==
The South Staffordshire Railway (SSR) was authorised by the South Staffordshire Railway Act 1847 (10 & 11 Vict. c. clxxxix), to build a line from Dudley through Walsall and Lichfield to join the Midland Railway main line at Wichnor, some distance south of Burton. This was to the Midland Railway's advantage, as with running powers over the SSR it would get access to Walsall and the manufacturing districts west of Birmingham. At the same time the LNWR could connect to the SSR and, with running powers, get access to Derby over the Midland Railway beyond Wichnor Junction. Relations between the Midland Railway and the LNWR were co-operative at the time, and the mutual benefit led the two companies to subscribe share capital to the SSR; private subscribers were also involved.

The South Staffordshire Railway opened its first section from a temporary station in Walsall (at Bridgeman Place) to a junction on the GJR main line, called Bescot Junction, on 1 November 1847. This secured access to Walsall for the LNWR, but passenger transits from there to Birmingham had to go round to the east via Aston and Vauxhall. The SSR pressed ahead with construction, and on 9 April 1849 it extended northwards from Walsall to Lichfield and Wichnor Junction. At Walsall a well-appointed new station was opened in Station Street, a short distance further north of the temporary station, which was now closed. Now the Midland Railway too had access to Walsall, and the LNWR had its desired access to Derby.

The line southwards to Dudley did not pass the Board of Trade inspection for passenger operation at first; goods traffic only, not needing the approval, started on 1 March 1850, and on 1 May 1850 the line southwards to Dudley from the Walsall to Bescot line was passed, and opened. This opening included an east-to-south spur enabling direct running from Bescot Junction (and Birmingham) to Dudley.

== Wolverhampton stations ==
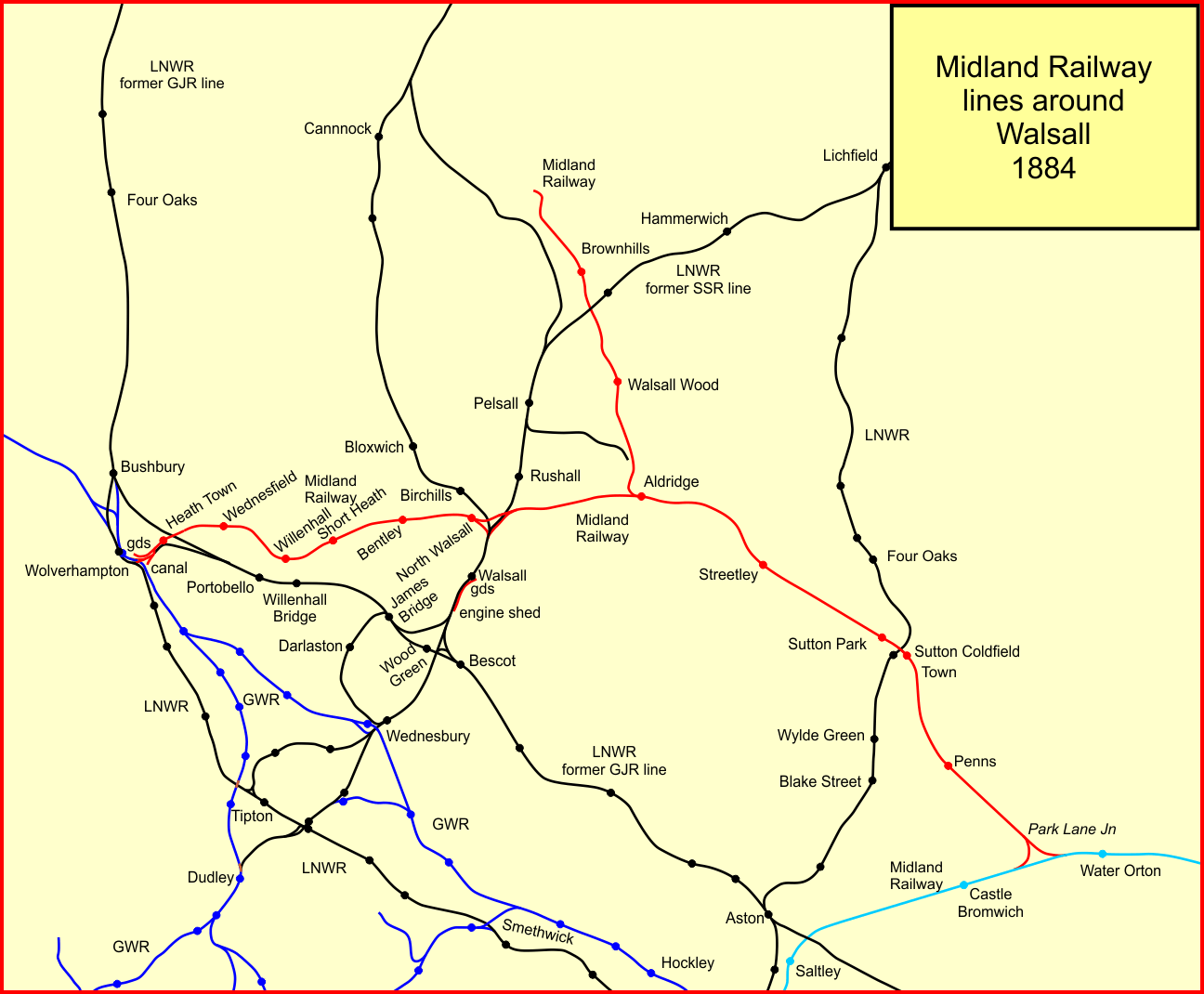
The Midland Railway around Walsall in 1884

With the opening of the Stour Valley Line in 1852, its station at Wolverhampton became the general station there for the LNWR group. From 1885 to 1972 it was called Wolverhampton High Level station, but since then it is the only Wolverhampton station and is simply named "Wolverhampton".

The Oxford, Worcester and Wolverhampton Railway (OW&WR) was constructing its line from south to north; in 1852 it had reached Dudley, and in 1854 it reached Wolverhampton, where it had its own station. The OW&WR station was later (1856 – 1972) called Wolverhampton Low Level. The Great Western Railway used it, also from 1854; the OW&WR and the GWR eventually merged, but for now relations were strained.

The old Grand Junction Railway route past Wolverhampton connected to the extension of the Stour Valley Line at Bushbury, north of Wolverhampton, but there was no convenient link from Wolverhampton to the GJR line east of Wolverhampton. There was considerable commercial trade between Walsall and Wolverhampton, and the poor railway connection was a source of dissatisfaction.

== Walsall and Wolverhampton Railway ==
=== Planning ===
A proposal was formulated for an independent "Walsall and Wolverhampton Railway" (W&WR), directly connecting them. A line about 6 1/2 miles long was planned; at Wolverhampton there were to be connections both to the BW&SVR station at Wolverhampton, and to the Oxford, Worcester and Wolverhampton Railway station.

Wolverhampton and Walsall Railway Act 1865
- Act of Parliament
- Parliament of the United Kingdom
- Long title: An Act to authorize the Construction of a Railway from Wolverhampton to Walsall, all in the County of Stafford.
- Citation: 28 & 29 Vict. c. clxxxi

Dates
- Royal assent: 29 June 1865

Text of statute as originally enacted

The projected route of the Walsall and Wolverhampton Railway was arranged to enter Walsall from the north, joining the South Staffordshire Railway at Ryecroft Junction. The incorporation of the W&WR by act of Parliament, the Wolverhampton and Walsall Railway Act 1865 (28 & 29 Vict. c. clxxxi), took place on 29 June 1865, but there were later several changes of plan, involving four acts of Parliament intermediately before completion of construction.

Wolverhampton and Walsall Railway Act 1866
- Act of Parliament
- Parliament of the United Kingdom
- Long title: An Act to authorize the Wolverhampton and Walsall Railway Company to make a Deviation from their authorized Railway, and to construct a short Branch; and for other Purposes with respect to their Undertaking.
- Citation: 29 & 30 Vict. c. cclxxvi

Dates
- Royal assent: 23 July 1866

Text of statute as originally enacted

Wolverhampton and Walsall Railway Act 1867
- Act of Parliament
- Parliament of the United Kingdom
- Long title: An Act to authorize the Wolverhampton and Walsall Railway Company to make a Deviation from their authorized Railway at Walsall; and for other Purposes with respect to the Company.
- Citation: 30 & 31 Vict. c. clxxx

Dates
- Royal assent: 12 August 1867

Text of statute as originally enacted

In particular, the route was changed: the line connecting to the Stour Valley Line at Wolverhampton was omitted, leaving only the connection at Wolverhampton to the GWR. The route into Walsall also changed, now approaching from the south, with a new station on the west side of the existing SSR station. The line would have had to make a huge sweep to the south as it approached Walsall to achieve this. A connection with the Stour Valley line was reinstated in a second act of Parliament, the Wolverhampton and Walsall Railway Act 1866 (29 & 30 Vict. c. cclxxvi), dated 23 July 1866, specifying that a connection was to be made at Crane Street Junction, east of the Wolverhampton station. In the 1867 session of Parliament, the route at Walsall was altered to make a northern entry, at Ryecroft Junction, and this was authorised by the Wolverhampton and Walsall Railway Act 1867 (30 & 31 Vict. c. clxxx) of 12 August 1867.

Wolverhampton and Walsall Railway Act 1868
- Act of Parliament
- Parliament of the United Kingdom
- Long title: An Act to confer further Powers on the Wolverhampton and Walsall Railway Company.
- Citation: 31 & 32 Vict. c. cxvi

Dates
- Royal assent: 13 July 1868

Next in the 1868 session, minor changes were made to the alignment of the junction at Ryecroft, and a further small change was made at Willenhall. In addition, a branch railway in Wednesfield was inserted. This act of Parliament, the Wolverhampton and Walsall Railway Act 1868 (31 & 32 Vict. c. cxvi) of 13 July 1868, also authorised a bridge to replace two level crossings.

=== Opening, and a dispute ===
Construction proceeded, and the line was at last opened for passengers, and probably for goods, on 1 November 1872. In the first years there seem to have been eight or nine return passenger train workings, worked by the LNWR.

During the planning phase, the W&WR had secured a commitment from the LNWR to use the W&WR for all relevant goods traffic between the towns. However once the line was in operation, the LNWR realised that it was to its advantage to forward such traffic over its own line (via the old GJR route or via Wednesbury), and it started to divert traffic that way. The W&WR was naturally displeased by this and sought a court order requiring compliance. They eventually had the requirement confirmed at arbitration, but this soured the co-operative spirit between the companies. The LNWR decided that, rather than fight the W&WR continually, absorption of the smaller company was the best way forward, and on 1 July 1875 an act of Parliament giving authorisation for this, the London and North Western Railway (New Lines and Additional Powers) Act 1875 (38 & 39 Vict. c. clii), was obtained. It took effect on 19 July 1875, from which date the W&WR ceased to exist.

The Midland Railway was running to Wolverhampton, getting access to Walsall over the SSR, and onwards over the W&WR; but had no goods facilities of its own at Wolverhampton or Walsall. Already heavily dependent on LNWR good will, it now saw that in addition it was dependent on a line – the W&WR route – controlled by the LNWR, although it had the protection that statutory running powers offered. At the same time the LNWR felt that the line was not a necessity to its own operation, and it agreed to transfer ownership of the W&WR to the Midland Railway. This took effect on 1 August 1876, ratified by the Midland Railway (Further Powers) Act 1876 of 11 August 1876.

Accordingly the W&WR line was now part of the Midland Railway network. LNWR trains off the Grand Junction line entering Wolverhampton used a short length of the W&WR line from Crane Street Junction to Heath Town Junction, 30 chains, by running powers. The Great Western Railway had running powers on the W&WR line for goods traffic from Heath Town Junction to Walsall.

== The Wolverhampton, Walsall and Midland Junction Railway ==
Wolverhampton, Walsall, and Midland Junction Railway Act 1872
- Act of Parliament
- Parliament of the United Kingdom
- Long title: An Act to authorise the construction of Railways between Walsall in Staffordshire and the Midland Railway in Warwickshire, to be called "The Wolverhampton, Walsall, and Midland Junction Railway."
- Citation: 35 & 36 Vict. c. clxxxii

Dates
- Royal assent: 6 August 1872

Text of statute as originally enacted

The South Staffordshire Railway too was becoming dominated by the LNWR. Originally the Midland Railway had seen this line as a useful access route to Walsall, but it appeared likely that difficulties lay ahead. The Midland Railway considered a more easterly connection to its network, on its main line at Water Orton. In the 1872 session of Parliament the Wolverhampton, Walsall, and Midland Junction Railway Act 1872 (35 & 36 Vict. c. clxxxii) was passed on 6 August 1872. This authorised a line from Ryecroft Junction and North Walsall to Castle Bromwich, joining the Midland Railway. The line was sponsored by the Midland Railway and extensive running powers were granted. A west to north curve was also authorised from North Walsall, which would have enabled direct running from Wolverhampton towards Wichnor over the SSR, but this was never built.

Wolverhampton, Walsall, and Midland Junction Railway Company's Act 1873
- Act of Parliament
- Parliament of the United Kingdom
- Long title: An Act to enable the Wolverhampton, Walsall, and Midland Junction Railway Company to make an additional Junction with the Midland Railway near Water Orton; and for other purposes relating to that Company.
- Citation: 36 & 37 Vict. c. cix

Dates
- Royal assent: 7 July 1873

Text of statute as originally enacted

The following year a further act of Parliament, the Wolverhampton, Walsall, and Midland Junction Railway Company's Act 1873 (36 & 37 Vict. c. cix) was obtained, authorising the formation of a triangular junction at Castle Bromwich, from Park Lane Junction to Water Orton Junction, leading towards Burton on the Midland Railway main line. The following year yet another act of Parliament, the Midland Railway (Additional Powers) Act 1874 (37 & 38 Vict. c. clx) of 18 July 1874) authorised the vesting of the WW&MJR in the Midland Railway. The line opened for goods trains on 19 May 1879 and for passenger traffic on 1 July 1879.

== Providing facilities ==
=== Accommodation at Wolverhampton ===
The Midland Railway considered Wolverhampton to be an important commercial centre, and wanted to construct ample terminal facilities there. It planned to open its own passenger station alongside the GWR station, but the LNWR announced its intention to enlarge its own facilities there in a way that conflicted. It also informed the Midland of its intention to discontinue the running powers into its Wolverhampton station, from June 1879. In fact the running powers existed by virtue of an act of Parliament, and the intention to discontinue was unlawful, and was later dropped. The Midland obtained tenders for its station at Wolverhampton, which would have been a relatively modest two-platform station. However relations with the LNWR improved and it was agreed that the Midland would be granted adequate facilities in the LNWR station. The Midland Railway decided that it did not need its own passenger station, but it did build its own goods facilities, and these opened on 4 October 1880.

The Midland Railway decided to make a canal transshipment point at Wolverhampton; it was on the Wyrley and Essington Canal, immediately south-west of Heath Town Junction, where the short branch joined the WW&MJR line. This was ready by the early summer of 1883. It became known as Wolverhampton Canal Depot, but after World War I canal traffic declined and the depot fell into disuse. It was formally closed in 1969.

=== Walsall goods accommodation ===
Midland Railway accommodation at Walsall too was inadequate, and in 1876 the LNWR indicated that the Midland Railway needed to arrange its own independent goods depot there. With supportive co-operation from the town council, a site was found to the east of the (LNWR) passenger station, and was brought into use in August 1880. The Midland Railway also required its own engine shed and depot at Walsall, and the opportunity was taken to build that at the southern end of the goods station site, on the east side of the line from Walsall station to Bescot. It came into use in September 1880. The goods depot was redeveloped as a goods concentration depot in 1962, but the decline in wagonload freight meant that its use did not endure.

== Brownhills Branch ==
The development of collieries in the Cannock Chase area spurred the construction of the Brownhills branch, running northwards from Aldridge. The first part was authorised in the Midland Railway (New Works, &c.) Act 1876 (39 & 40 Vict. c. cxlv), of 13 July 1876, from Aldridge to Walsall Wood, a distance of 2 miles 3 furlongs. In 1880 the extension to Cannock was authorised. The southern part of the line was line was available for traffic on 30 April 1881, and throughout for mineral traffic from 1 April 1882. A passenger service started on 1 July 1884, between Aldridge and Brownhills, with an intermediate station at Walsall Wood. There were three passenger trains a day. The Brownhills station was little used as it was inconveniently located, and there was a better station on the Lichfield line. The line was double track and the mineral traffic was heavy.

== Sutton Coldfield station ==
After the Grouping of the railways, Sutton Coldfield Town station was closed from 1 January 1925. The LMS preferred passengers to use the former LNWR line. There was a petition against the withdrawal, but it closed nonetheless.

== Train services ==
On the Midland taking over the Wolverhampton line in 1879, the total passenger train service frequency increased considerably, with many trains running through to Birmingham via Walsall (reverse) and Sutton Park, and in a limited number of cases to Derby. From 1 January 1909 Midland Railway trains were switched to the LNWR route between Walsall and Wolverhampton, and some LNWR used the Midland Railway route via Willenhall to avoid reversal at Walsall.

Writing in 1915, Groves said that the stations on the line with the exception of Heath Town "have a considerable goods traffic in both directions. Midland stations between Walsall and Wolverhampton have from 5 to 8 (mostly London and North Western) trains each way daily." The reference is to passenger trains, some of which omitted some stations on the line. "Four freight trains each way daily use the North Walsall and Aldridge direct line [the avoiding line from North Walsall Junction to Lichfield Road Junction]. Fourteen [passenger] trains each way run daily, most of these being to or from Birmingham."

In early 1917 sections of the two routes, Sutton Park to Aldridge on 7 January and North Walsall to Willenhall from 4 February, were converted to single track, the released materials being taken to France. Double track was restored on 20 March and 8 May 1921 respectively.

In 1895 the train service consisted of 11 trains each way, mostly travelling throughout from Birmingham to Wolverhampton, reversing at Walsall. there were three services each way on Sundays. A similar pattern applied in 1910. The Brownhill branch had three trains Mondays to Friday and five on Saturdays, in 1895. In 1910 this had reduced to three and 4 respectively.

In 1922 the service on the Sutton Park section was slightly reduced, and the Walsall to Wolverhampton service was reduced to three trains each way, seven days a week. There were two trains a day, weekdays only, on the Brownhills line.

== Grouping, and nationalisation ==
In 1923 the Midland Railway, and also the LNWR, were formed into the new London Midland and Scottish Railway (LMS) as part of a process known as the "grouping", following the Railways Act 1921. In 1948 the LMS was taken into national ownership, as part of British Railways, following the Transport Act 1947.

== Closures ==
The Brownhills branch passenger service was never busy, and it was withdrawn from 31 March 1930.

Urban tram services severely affected passenger business on the lines west of Walsall, and over time the train frequency was reduced accordingly. Combined with the impact of the more convenient ex-LNWR route, this made the passenger business unsustainable and the line passenger service from Walsall to Wolverhampton was discontinued on 5 January 1931. At the same time the section east of Walsall, running through the "leafy eastern outskirts of Birmingham" remained relatively buoyant.

The W&WR route was briefly reopened for passenger traffic in July and August 1942. Enemy bombing had resulted in the blockage of the LNWR route at Willenhall, and the W&WR line provided a temporary emergency alternative.

Diesel multiple units took over the passenger service on the Sutton Park line from 17 November 1958. Nevertheless as part of a national review of unremunerative passenger services, it was decided that the passenger service was not to continue, and it was withdrawn from 18 January 1965.

The direct line between Lichfield Rd Jn and North Walsall had never had an ordinary passenger service. It usefulness as a goods train route was nullified by the severing of the W&WR line near Bentley for the construction of the M6 motorway on 28 September 1964. Through trains on the line had been ended since 10 August. Accordingly the Lichfield Road Junction to North Walsall line was closed from 1 January 1965, although it remained in suspense until formally closed on 1 May 1967.

The Sutton Park line was downgraded to a freight-only route from 7 January 1968; on the same date the spur from Park Lane Junction to Water Orton Junction was singled. The spur from Park Lane Junction to Castle Bromwich Junction was singled on 3 August 1969. Meanwhile, the section from Ryecroft Junction to Birchills Power Station continued in use until 12 May 1980. While this continued, Ryecroft Junction could claim to be Britain's last four-route junction. The Sutton Park line was restored to passenger operation for through trains on 2 December 1984.

== Location list ==
=== Wolverhampton line ===
- Walsall; temporary station Bridgeman Street, opened 1 November 1847; replaced by permanent station 9 April 1849;
- Ryecroft Junction;
- North Walsall; convergence of line from Crane Street; opened 1 November 1872; closed 13 July 1925;
- Bentley; opened 1 November 1872; closed 1 October 1898;
- Short Heath Clarks Lane; opened 1 November 1872; closed 5 January 1931;
- Willenhall Market Place; opened 1 November 1872; renamed Willenhall 1 April 1904, renamed Willenhall Stafford Street 2 June 1924' closed 5 January 1931;
- Wednesfield; opened 1 November 1872; closed 5 January 1931;
- Heath Town; opened 1 November 1872; closed 1 April 1910;
- Heath Town Junction; convergence of LNWR line from Portobello Junction;
- Wolverhampton goods;
- Divergence to Wolverhampton Low Level;
- Crane Street Junction; convergence with Stour Valley Line;
- Wolverhampton High Level.

=== Sutton Park line ===
- Ryecroft Junction; above;
- Lichfield Road Junction; convergence of by-pass line from North Walsall;
- Aldridge; opened 1 July 1879; close 18 January 1965;
- Streetley; opened 1 July 1879; closed 18 January 1965; early name Jervis Town but not used in Bradshaw;
- Sutton Park; opened 1 July 1879; closed 18 January 1965;
- Sutton Coldfield; opened 1 July 1879 renamed Sutton Coldfield Town 1 May 1882; rename Sutton Coldfield 1 April 1904; renamed Sutton Coldfield Town 2 June 1924; closed 1 January 1925;
- Park Lane Junction;
- Water Orton;
  - Castle Bromwich.
