= Karen Johal =

British actress (born 1992)

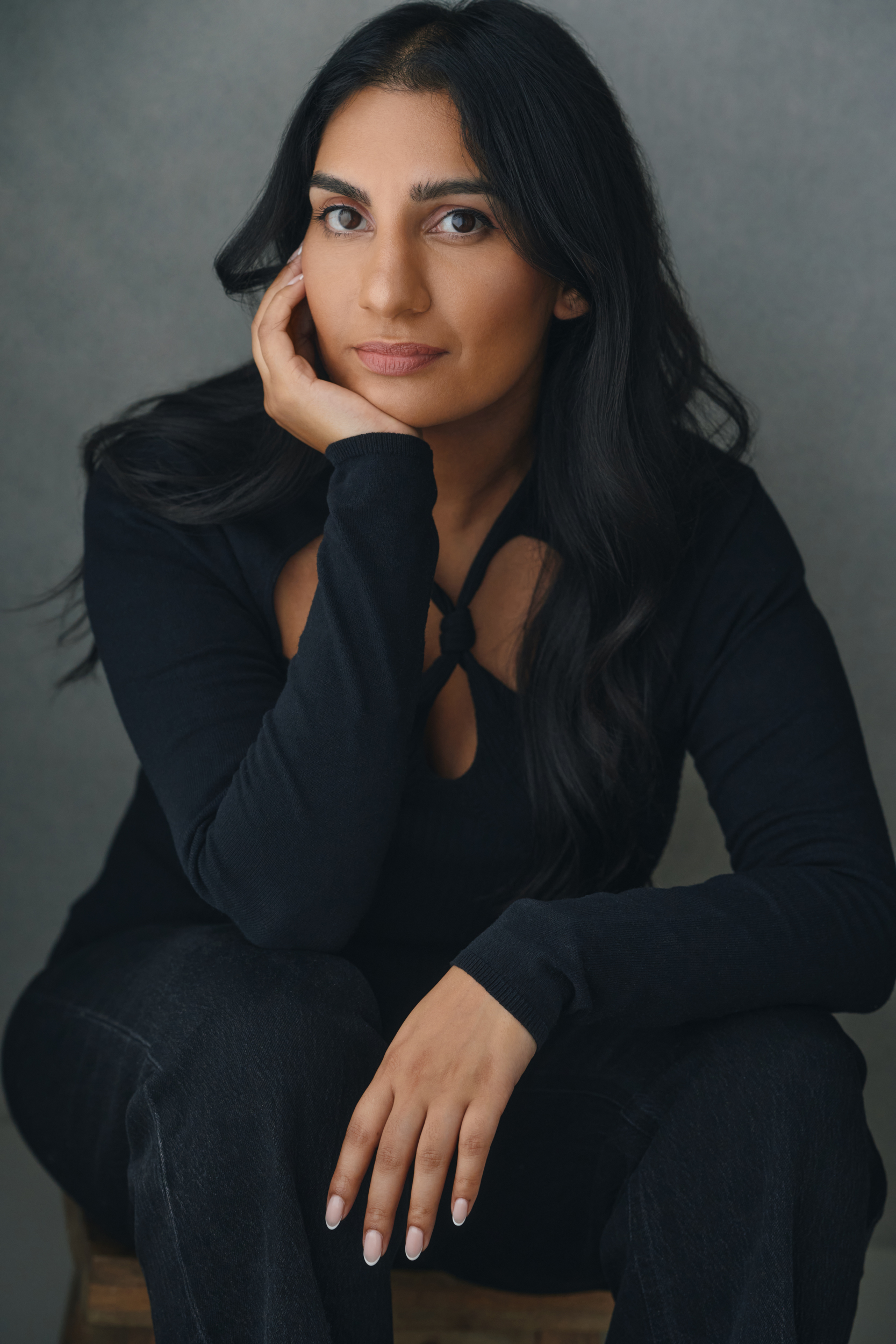
Johal in 2023

Karen Johal (born 13 March 1991) is a British actress of Indian descent. She is best known for playing Nicole Shelley on season 3 of the Apple TV+ television series Ted Lasso (2020). She gained further recognition for her portrayal of Noreen Khan in the BBC television series Phoenix Rise (2023). She is a graduate of The American Academy of Dramatic Arts in Manhattan, New York where she performed in the extended ensemble for The Public Theater and performed live at Carnegie Hall. In June 2023, she was featured in a national ad campaign for global messaging platform WhatsApp alongside British broadcaster Alex Scott.

== Early life ==
Karen Johal was born on 13 March 1991 in Birmingham, England, to British parents. She is of Indian descent and has two younger brothers. Johal grew up in Aston and comes from a working class background. She attended St. Clare's Primary School in Handsworth and Perry Beeches Secondary School in Perry Barr.

At age 16 she enrolled at Birmingham Metropolitan College at the Sutton Coldfield campus, where she received A Levels in English Literature, Psychology, Fine Art and Drama. After finishing college, she began working full time as a retail assistant in Birmingham city centre and part time at the Birmingham Hippodrome. Whilst working, she auditioned unsuccessfully for several UK drama schools with hopes of studying acting professionally.

In 2014, after a successful audition in London, she was accepted into The American Academy of Dramatic Arts and relocated to Manhattan, New York. After graduating in 2016 she was offered a place in the third year program, performing in theater productions of Moira Buffini's Welcome to Thebes, Megan Cohen's Truest and Qui Nguyen's She Kills Monsters. Johal also starred opposite Scottish actor Alan Cumming in original musical Me and the Girls directed by Douglas Carter Beane. The musical was choreographed by Lorin Latarro and featured original music by Noël Coward.

== Career ==
In 2017, Johal starred in an original play called Camel, written by actor and comedian Charly Clive, performing at Under St. Marks Theater in New York's East Village before starring in the off-Broadway production of Julius Caesar directed by Oskar Eustis at Shakespeare in the Park for The Public Theater.

For her performance as Ezme in Camel, Johal was well received by critics. Popdust praised her performance, writing that "Karen Johal is, like her character, an expert in throwing back whatever is thrown at her". Theater is Easy wrote similarly, praising the casting and noted Johal "effectively captures Ezme's emotional turns" and "gives an engaging performance, stealing every scene she is in".

New York Theatre Review described Johal as having "Garafolo Sharp-delivery" and praised her "capable pragmatism" noting that "it consistently contains an undertone of warmth" which transformed the character potential shrillness "into the concern of a loved one". The Huffington Post also praised her performance, describing her as "amazing".

Later that year she performed on stage at Carnegie Hall in the premiere of The Journey to America for Orchestra Moderne. The performance was directed by Amy Andersson and composed by Emmy award winning American composer Lolita Ritmanis.

The following year, Johal starred in a number of off-Broadway theatre productions including As You Like It and The 7th Inning Stretch for Miles Square Theater in New Jersey. She played a series of leading roles in the short films, Frank's Plan (2018) for Amazon Prime, Man on the Phone (2019) and the YouTube web series Everyone Else Has (2017).

In 2020, Johal relocated to the UK, due to the global pandemic. The following year she played the lead role as Una in David Harrower's Blackbird. Her performance was praised for its emotional vulnerability. Theatre and Other Things LDN described Johal as "a rising star", noting her performance during a monologue confronting Ray, which they said "broke our hearts". The critic further highlighted "the level of vulnerability" Johal was able to portray on stage, adding that she "had us at every word".

She later played the role of doctor/therapist in Duncan MacMillan's People, Places and Things. Both productions were regional premieres performed in the city of Lichfield, Staffordshire.

In late 2021, Johal starred in a national Christmas commercial for global retailer TK Maxx. The commercial, called "Christmas to the Maxx", was directed by Raine Allen-Miller and aired in the UK/ Europe.

In Spring 2022, Johal performed at the Sky Comedy Rep festival at the Birmingham Repertory Theatre. Sky Comedy Rep is an annual comedy festival, featuring original one-act plays from new playwrights. Writers are paired with mentors throughout the research and development stage. Past mentors have included Meera Syal, Guz Khan and Sanjeev Bhaskar. During the festival Johal was cast in the new play Mismatch written by Ashfaq Gorsi and directed by The Rep's Artistic Director Iqbal Khan. The production was performed across two nights in March 2022 and was hosted by Birmingham Comedian, Daren Elliott.

Later in the year, Johal was cast in the newly commissioned BBC television series Phoenix Rise. The show was written and created by Matt Evans and Perrie Balthazar. Phoenix Rise follows a diverse group of teenagers who have been excluded from a West Midlands school as they begin their first steps back into education. Johal played a recurring role on the series as Noreen Khan. Production took place in Coventry and lasted over six months, filming up until the end of 2022. Season one launched on BBC iPlayer on 21 March 2023 and on 12 April 2023 it was confirmed a second series would be aired later in the year. A third and fourth series has also been commissioned by the BBC. In 2024 it was announced that Johal would not be returning for the third season citing scheduling conflicts.

Whilst working on production for Phoenix Rise, Johal auditioned for the role of Nicole Shelley on the hit Apple TV+ series Ted Lasso. The award winning television series starring Jason Sudeikis, Hannah Waddingham and Nick Mohammed, began production on its rumoured final season on 7 March 2022.

After an initial audition for executive producer Sudeikis and the casting team at Theo Park, Johal won the role. Season 3, aired on Apple TV+ on 15 March 2023 and the character of Nicole Shelley was introduced in episode 7 "The Strings That Bind Us". Johal played Nicole Shelley, the younger sister of Nathan Shelley, played by Nick Mohammed until the third series ended on 31 May 2023. In March 2024 Apple TV+ officially renewed Ted Lasso for a fourth series which aired in August 2026.

In June 2023, season 3 of Ted Lasso was nominated for 21 Emmy awards including Best Comedy Series.

In January 2024, Johal received a nomination for Outstanding Ensemble in a Comedy Series by the Screen Actors Guild Awards for Ted Lasso. The awards ceremony took place in February 2024 as it was delayed due to the SAG AFTRA strike, which ended in November 2023.

Johal was cast in a short film for MTV Entertainment titled The Waves (2023) for The Corner Shop in aid of Women's History Month in March 2023. The short film was directed by Bafta award winning director Sindha Agha and aired on Comedy Central, Paramount, VH1 and all channels owned by the MTV Entertainment Group.The short film was developed in concept, based on a poem by Virginia Woolf. "For pain words are lacking", the focal point of the piece centered around the female body and relation to pain.

In Spring 2023, Johal relocated to Hamburg, Germany, to play Zarina in Ayad Akhtar's The Who and the What. The production ran for six weeks at The English Theatre of Hamburg with an all British cast. Johal's performance as Zarina was praised by German critics for its composure, convinction and portrayal of the character's independence.

Theater Time described it as "a brilliant performance" noting that Johal "calmly and patiently" inhabits the role. Die Austige noted Johal as "convincing", highlighting her portrayal of Zarina's conflict between loyalty to her father and her desire for independence, ultimately choosing to "go her own way".

Hamburger Abdenblatt, similarly praised Johal's interpretation describing Zarina as a "confident and modern young woman" whose emotions are tempered by a "razor sharp mind". The publication also praised director Clifford Dean's staging, and the productions ensemble lamenting "a brilliant cast of actors".

Several German media outlets also wrote about previous iterations of the play, criticising their controversial decisions to cast white actors as Pakistani American characters. Akhtar's play has been produced all over the world with notable productions in Vienna, Austria, Denmark and New York.

In June 2023, Johal was approached to star in WhatsApp's global campaign, A Private Message alongside British Broadcaster Alex Scott MBE. The campaign was launched to help promote WhatsApp's new chat encryption services for safe messaging and mental health awareness.

Johal has also appeared in global campaigns for F1 sponsor Aramco Global,Northwell Health. and the American Heart Association.

In March 2026, it was announced that Johal had been cast on the fourth season of the Netflix Series The Diplomat, which premiered on October 15th 2026. Johal appeared in the first episode alongside Keri Russell, Rufus Sewell, Alison Janney and Bradley Whitford.

== Personal life ==
Johal currently resides in the UK.

== Filmography ==
=== Film ===
Film appearances by Karen Johal
Year	Title	Role	Notes
2018	Frank's Plan	Kathy	Short film
2019	Man on the Phone	Felicity	Short film
2023	The Waves	Woman in Labour	Short film

=== Television ===
Television appearances by Karen Johal
Year	Title	Role	Notes
2026	The Diplomat	TBA	TBA
2023	Ted Lasso	Nicole Shelley	Nominated for Outstanding Ensemble in a Comedy Series
2022	Phoenix Rise	Noreen Khan	

=== Theatre ===
Theatre appearances by Karen Johal
Year	Title	Role	Director	Playwright	Theatre
2007	4.48 Psychosis	Lead	Sally Humphreys	Sarah Kane	Sutton Coldfield College
2016	Measure for Measure	Duke Vincentio	Sheila Bandyopadhyay	William Shakespeare	The American Academy of Dramatic Arts
2016	Welcome to Thebes	Eurydice	Barbara Rubin	Moira Buffini	The American Academy of Dramatic Arts
2016	Me and the Girls	Nasim	Douglas Carter Beane	Douglas Carter Beane	The American Academy of Dramatic Arts
2016	Truest	Jen	Jessica Holt	Megan Cohen	The American Academy of Dramatic Arts
2017	She Kills Monsters	Farrah	George Heslin	Qui Nyuen	The American Academy of Dramatic Arts
2017	Camel	Ezme	Michael Bradshaw Flynn	Charly Clive	Under St. Marks
2017	Julius Caesar	Lead Ensemble	Oskar Eustis	William Shakespeare	Delacourte Central Park
2017	The Journey to America	MC	Amy Andersson	Amy Andersson	Carnegie Hall
2017	Satisfaction	Sammie	Adam Fitzgerald	Nandita Shenoy	The American Academy of Dramatic Arts
2018	Good Fit	Asma	Anna Loyd Bradshaw	Nkenna Akunna	Wow Cafe
2018	American As...	Anita	Peter J Kuo	Nandita Shenoy	Miles Square
2018	Rise/Fall	God	Sheila Bandyopadhyay	Sheila Bandyopadhyay	Leviathan Lab
2019	As You Like It	Phebe	Alexis Confer	William Shakespeare	Teatro Latea
2019	This is Me	Claire	Yudelka Heyer	Barbara Bernardi	The American Academy of Dramatic Arts
2020	The Tempest	Caliban	Ryan Cupello	William Shakespeare	SoHo Shakes
2020	Lysistrata	Lysistrata	Alexis Confer	Aristophanes	Teatro Latea
2021	Blackbird	Una	Christopher Buckle	David Harrower	Sandfields Pumping Station
2021	People, Places & Things	Doctor/Therapist	Christopher Buckle	Duncan Macmillan	Sandfields Pumping Station
2022	Mismatch	Zainab	Iqbal Khan	Ashfaq Gorsi	The Birmingham Rep
2023	The Who and the What	Zarina	Clifford Dean	Ayad Akhtar	The English Theatre of Hamburg
2024	Why Are You Here?	Lata	Paul Hayes	Radhika Iyer	An Tain Arts Centre

=== Radio ===
Radio Appearances by Karen Johal
Year	Title	Role	Station
2021	Midlands Masala with Gagan Grewal	Guest	BBC Sounds
2023	National NDR Radio Hamburg	Guest	NDR
