= Perry Beeches =

- Interactive map of Perry Beeches
- Coordinates: 52.536032°N 1.906139°W
- Country: England
- County: West Midlands
- City: Birmingham
- Constituency: Perry Barr
- Postal codes: B42, B44

Perry Beeches is an area of Great Barr, Birmingham, England, within the parliamentary constituencies of Birmingham Perry Barr, and Birmingham Erdington. It was formerly part of the estate of Perry Hall, and from 1894 until 1928 came under the auspices of Perry Barr Urban District, in Staffordshire.

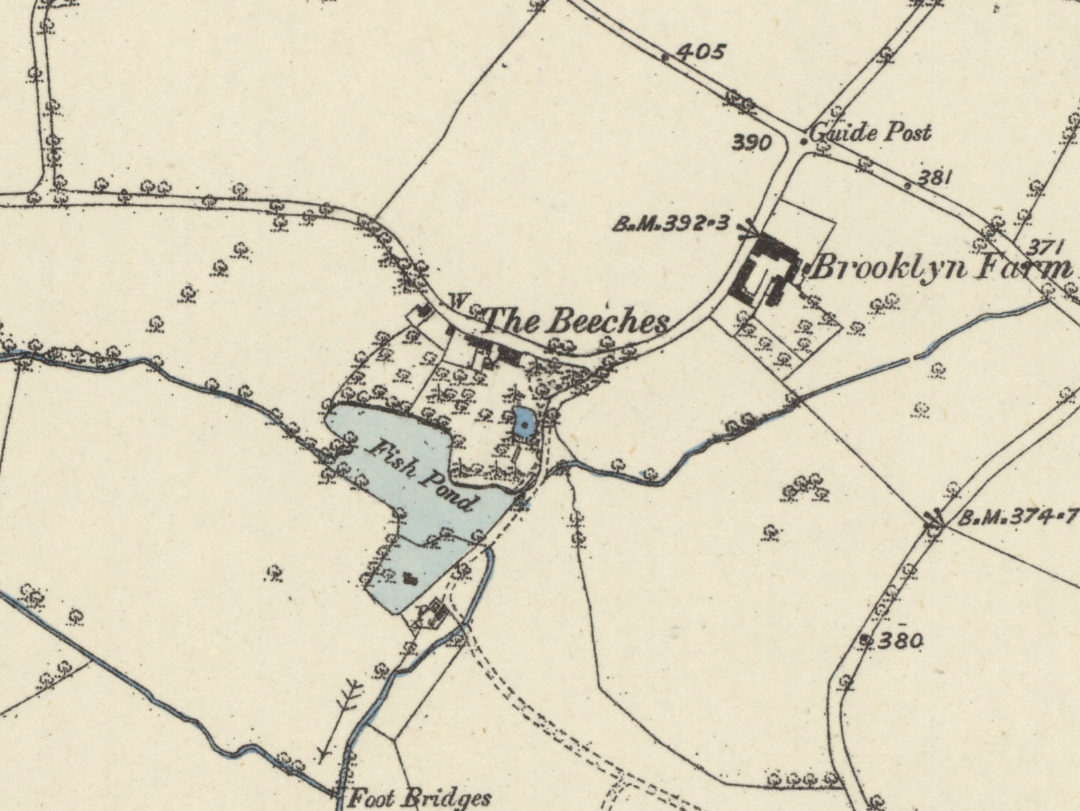
The Beeches, on the Ordnance Survey map of Staffordshire, sheet LXIX.NW published in 1884. To the east is Brooklyn Farm, now the site of James Watt campus (formerly Brooklyn College). The fish pond no longer exists.

The area takes its name from a 17th-century house, "The Beeches", which was demolished circa 1960 after the current vicarage of St Matthew's Church had been built alongside it.

Previously agricultural (the forger William Booth (died 1812) farmed in the area), with some sand and gravel quarrying to the north, in the area known as Queslett, between Aldridge and Queslett Roads; it was developed as a residential suburb of Birmingham immediately before and after World War II. Many of the houses in the Thornbridge Avenue and Booth's Farm Road areas were constructed before the outbreak of war, while the remaining part of the estate (between the Beeches and Aldridge Roads) was completed after 1945. The oldest extant buildings are two farm cottages, constructed in 1910, now serving as offices adjacent to Brooklyn Garage. The Perry Beeches area is bisected by the M6 motorway, constructed in the early 1970s. Until its 2024 dissolution, the Central Motorway Police Group was headquartered on Thornbridge Avenue, giving access to the motorway in both directions. The Tame Valley Canal, constructed in 1844, marks the area's southern boundary, with a bridge over the canal, now prohibited to motor vehicles, linking it to Perry Barr Park.

The housing in the southern part of Perry Beeches—an area known as The Beeches Estate, around Thornbridge Avenue and at the eastern end of the Beeches Road (formerly known as Brick Kiln Lane)—was built by Henry Boot of Sheffield for the First National Housing Trust (Boot also built a similar estate, albeit with houses of a slightly larger floorplan, at Pheasey, to the north-east of the Beeches Estate on land that was part of Aldridge Urban District Council and now part of Walsall Metropolitan Borough Council). Most of these houses were built in blocks of 4–6 with some blocks of 2 semi-detached in a similar style where space would not allow for larger blocks, or where the land was too steep for these blocks - notably in Holmesfield Road; that was built on a steep hill.

While many residents have now bought these properties and made many alterations, the original floorplan for most houses consisted of a hallway, front room and then a rear kitchen with pantry, coal hole and a downstairs toilet. As these houses were originally rented, they had identical wooden doors and windows painted cream, with either dark green or brown doors and outer frames. Wooden fences with a garden hedge were also placed around every house.

The houses to the north of the area (north of the Beeches Road between Walsall Road and the M6) were by contrast privately owned. These are mostly blocks of semi-detached houses with generally more decorative features, including large circular bay windows on the upper and ground floor, stained glass front doors and windows, and in most cases both a front and back reception room.

At the rear of most houses in the Walsall Road and Booths Farm Road area, the houses were built with long rear access 'right of ways'. These proved useful as more people owned a private car from the early 1950s onwards and were able to build a garage on the bottom part of their back garden plot opening onto these 'right of ways'. They also made good short-cuts. In recent years, however, these became good access routes for burglars breaking into garages and houses. Due to this, many now have large padlocked gates at their roadside entrance and are only accessible to residents.

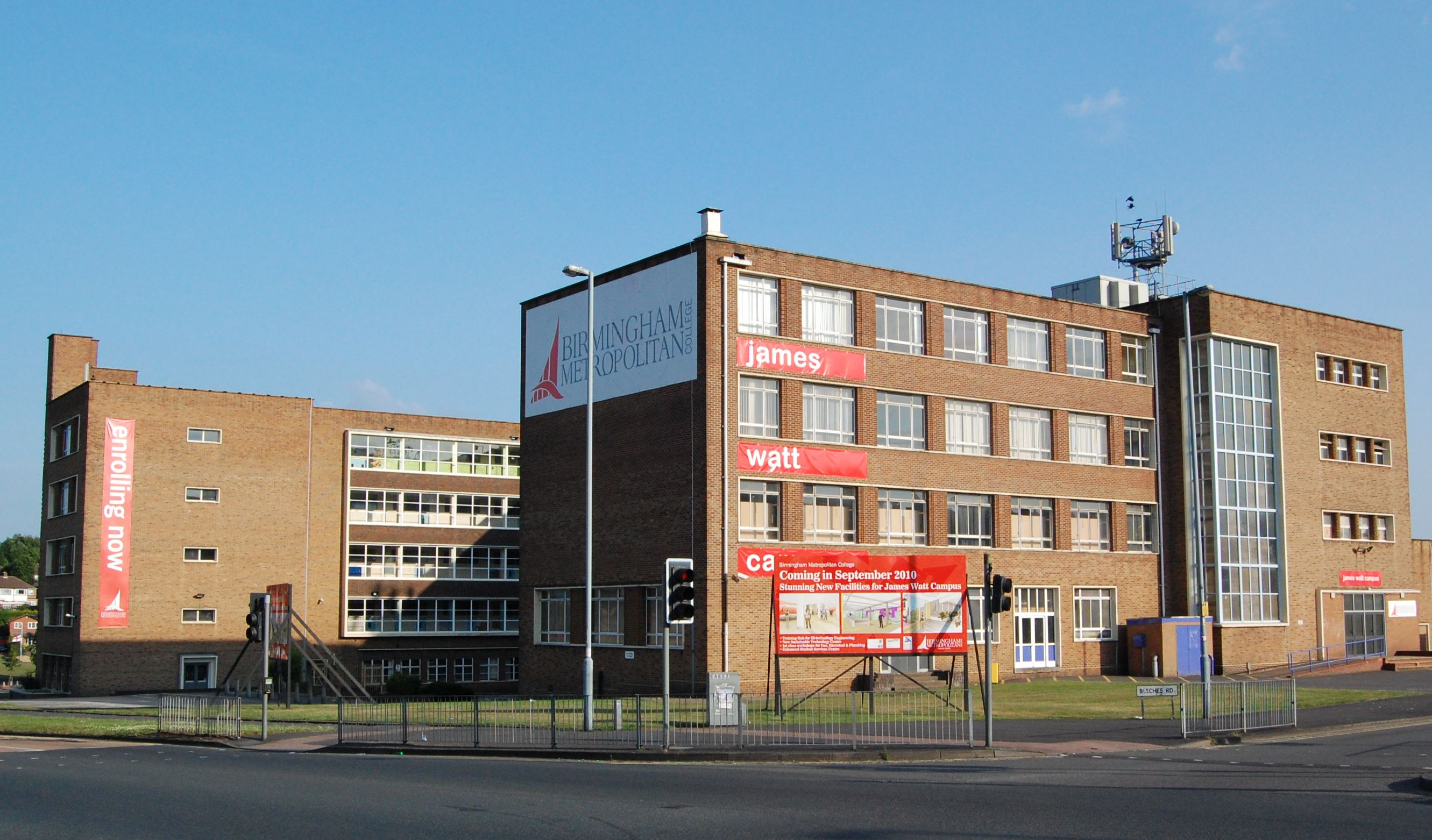
Birmingham Metropolitan College's James Watt campus, seen in June 2010

There are a number of primary schools around this area and two secondary schools with one, Arena Academy (the former Perry Beeches Secondary School), being directly located on the Beeches Estate. Further education is provided at the James Watt campus of Birmingham Metropolitan College, formerly Brooklyn Technical College.
