= Alicia Charles =

English actress

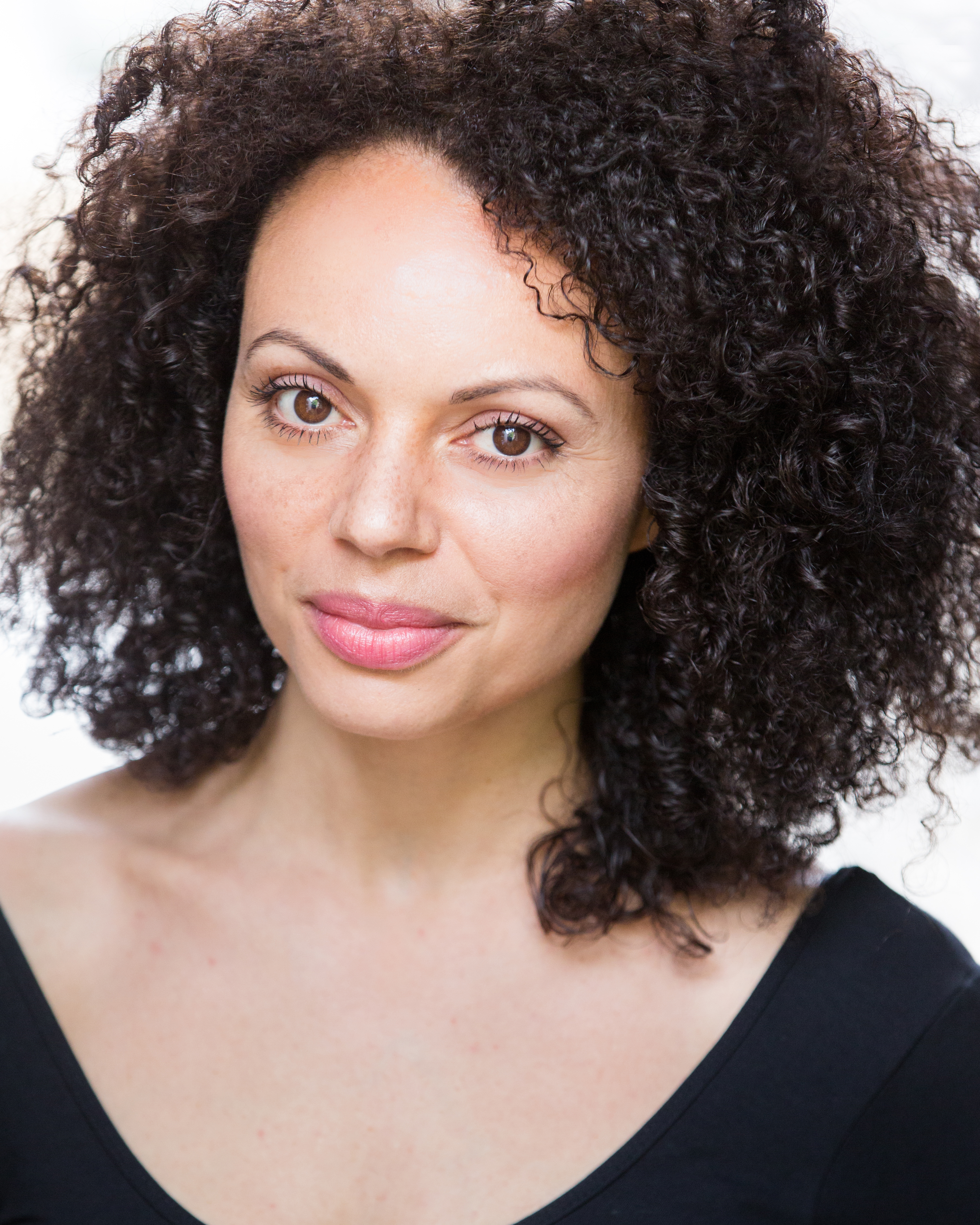
Charles in 2017

Alicia Charles is an English television, film and theatre actress.

Charles has starred in numerous long-running British television shows in main and recurring roles, her most recent being Casualty where she played Anna Mills.

She has featured on stage alongside on-screen appearances and she has also appeared in small film roles.

== Career ==
One of Charles' first on screen roles was in an episode of Coronation Street in 2005 playing Donna. She later had a break from appearing on screen before appearing in British drama series WPC 56 as Lottie Harris. She later appeared as supporting character Sarah Kenwood in the British mystery thriller The Five. In the same year, she appeared in an episode of Holby City as Emma Burghley.

In 2018, she appeared in period drama Father Brown as Sheila Barnett, voiced Angela in Apple Tree House and appeared as Lommie's Mother in the American horror series Nightflyers.

From 2004 to 2023, she appeared in long running British soap Doctors as various characters, her most prominent one being Social Worker Sofia Lilanga appearing in seven episodes in 2019.

More recently, she played Hazel Bailey in the BBC Series Phoenix Rise appearing in 18 episodes.

In 2025, she appeared as Gabriella Dalmori in Beyond Paradise and Casualty as recurring character Anna Mills.

== Filmography ==
Alicia Charles Filmography
Title	Year	Role	Notes
Coronation Street	2005	Donna	Credited using a different name
WPC 56	2014	Lottie Harris	3 episodes
Persona	2014	Natasha	2 episodes
Dreaming of Peggy Lee	2015	Friendly Woman	Short Film
The Five	2016	Sarah Kenwood	TV Mini Series; 3 episodes
Holby City	2016	Emma Burghley	1 episode
Father Brown	2018	Sheila Barnett	1 episode
Apple Tree House	2018	Angela	1 episode
Nightflyers	2018	Lommie's Mother	1 episode
Henry V	2020	Bardolph & Williams	TV Movie
Bard from the Barn	2020	Cleopatra	1 episode
If it were Done	2020	Witch	Short film
Paradise	2020	Social Officer	Short film
Infinite	2021	Brasserie Manager	Film
Tarftuffe	2021	Amy	Short film
Doctors	2004-2023	Donna Harper (1 episode) Lucy Murphy (1 episode) Sofia Lilanga (7 episodes) Marjorie Arbuthnott (1 episode)	Total of 10 episodes
Girl in the Video	2024	Jennifer	Film
Phoenix Rise	2023-2024	Hazel	18 episodes
Beyond Paradise	2025	Gabriella Dalmori	1 episode
Casualty	2025	Anna Mills	4 episodes
