= St Matthew's Church, Birmingham =

St Matthew's Church, Birmingham may refer to:

- St Matthew's Church, Duddeston and Nechells
- St Matthew's Church, Perry Beeches
