= Arena Academy =

Coordinates: 52.5407°N 1.9083°W

Location
- Beeches Road; Perry Beeches; Birmingham, West Midlands, B42 2PY; England

Information
- Type: Academy
- Local authority: Birmingham City Council
- Trust: CORE Education Trust
- Department for Education URN: 145580 Tables
- Ofsted: Reports
- Headteacher: Raj Mann
- Gender: Coeducational
- Age: 11 to 16
- Website: https://www.corearena.academy/

Arena Academy, formally known as the Perry Beeches Academy, is a coeducational secondary school located in the Perry Beeches area of Birmingham in the West Midlands of England.

Previously a community school administered by Birmingham City Council, Perry Beeches School converted to academy status on 3 May 2012 and was renamed Perry Beeches The academy. It has since been renamed a third time to Arena Academy.

The school offers GCSEs and BTECs as programmes of study for pupils.

== Financial Mismanagement Scandal ==
While it was known as Perry Beeches Academy, the school was the leader of the Perry Beeches Trust, a multi-academy trust formed of the academy and four other Perry Beeches academies in the area. Together, the schools offered a combined sixth form provision.

In March 2016 the Education Funding Agency published a critical report on the financial management and governance of the Trust. The report showed that the chief executive of the Trust, Liam Nolan, was being paid by sub-contractors as well as by the Trust. In addition more than £2.5 million of free school meal funding could not be checked because financial records had been deleted, that £1.3 million had been paid to a sub-contractor without a written contract or after a formal procurement exercise, and there was not effective oversight by trustees. In April 2016 the Education Funding Agency started investigating additional allegations.

In May 2016 it was announced that the chief executive of the trust, Liam Nolan had resigned, as well as the trust's entire governing board. The five academies and free schools that were formerly part of the trust were then administered directly by the Department for Education until a new sponsor could be found for the schools. The trust had a debt of £2.1 million, and was running at a significant deficit.

Perry Beeches III was put in special measures in October 2015 by Ofsted, and in November 2016 the academy trust was rated "inadequate".

== Notable alumni ==
- Karen Johal (born 1991), actress (Ted Lasso, Phoenix Rise).
