= North Birmingham Technical College =

College in Birmingham, England

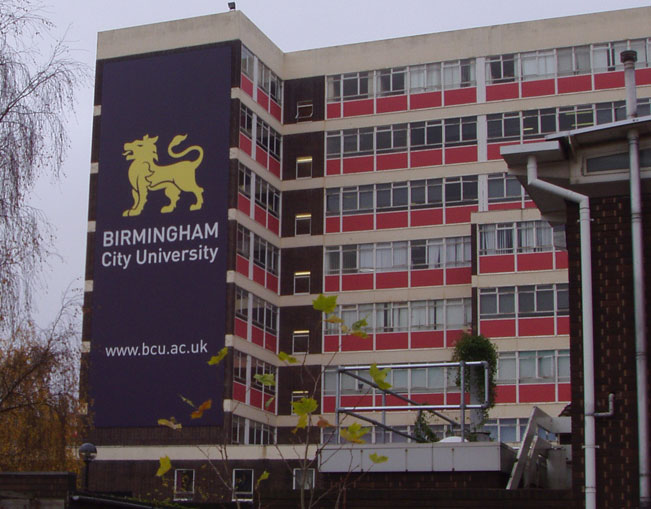
Former building of the college, now part of Birmingham City University

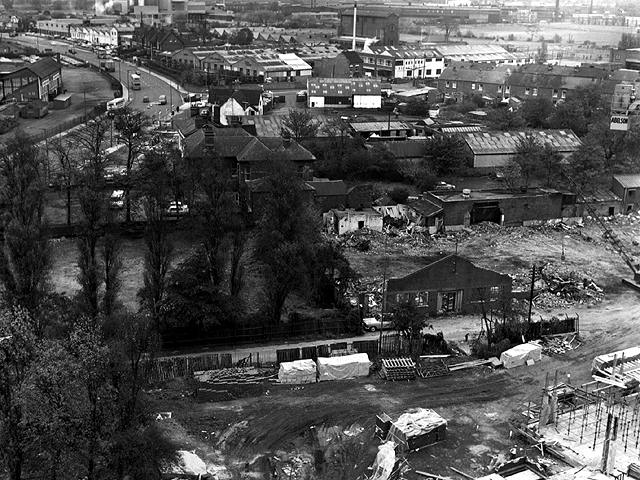
Site of Perry Barr (later City North) campus before building began in the early 1970s

North Birmingham Technical College (originally Aston Technical College and then part of UCE Birmingham) and finally part of Birmingham City University. The college was created in 1967 when Aston Technical College moved to Perry Barr but even then it was being earmarked as part of the proposed Birmingham Polytechnic. At the start of 1971, the college became part of the new City of Birmingham Polytechnic.

In 1972, work began on the already planned new buildings for the college at Perry Barr which became the Attwood and Baker buildings of the Birmingham Polytechnic (later Birmingham City University) Perry Barr campus. The buildings were demolished in 2018.
