= Perry Barr Urban District =

Former urban district in Staffordshire, England

Coordinates: 52.525°N 1.904°W

Perry Barr
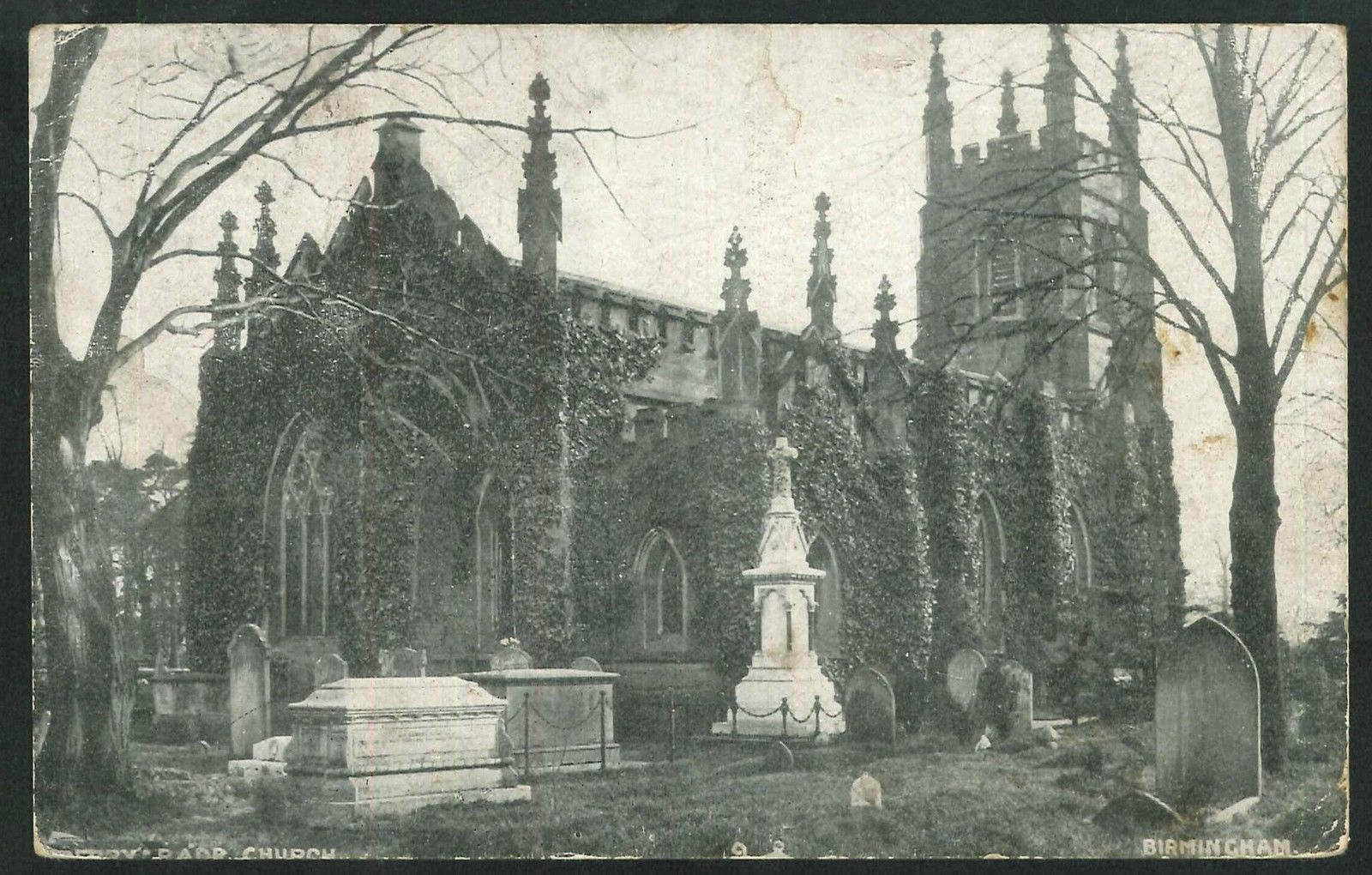
- Postcard of St John the Evangelist parish church, taken circa 1904
- Population
  - 1901: 2,348
  - 1911: 2,403
  - 1921: 2,700
- History
  - Created: 1894
  - Abolished: 1928
  - Succeeded by: City of Birmingham
- Status: Urban District
- Government: Urban District Council

Perry Barr Urban District, or Urban District of Perry Barr was an area of England for local government administrative purposes. As such, it was administered locally by Perry Barr Urban District Council. It took its name from the included hamlet of Perry Barr, which was until then in the parish of Handsworth. It was created in 1894 as a result of the Local Government Act 1894, as a subdivision of the administrative county of Staffordshire, and existed until 1928, when it largely became part of Birmingham, and so also part of the county of Warwickshire. At that time, small parts of the district were granted to the Royal Town of Sutton Coldfield, also in Warwickshire, and to West Bromwich (remaining in Staffordshire until 1974). In 1974, Birmingham was taken out of Warwickshire and became part of the West Midlands county, as was Sutton Coldfield, which became part of Birmingham at the same time.

The district included areas which today are known as:

- Perry Barr
- Perry Beeches
- (Old) Oscott
- Queslett
- Hamstead
- Handsworth (parts of)
- Great Barr (parts of)

The area is still considered to be in the Staffordshire vice-county for wildlife recording purposes.
