= Phoenix Rise (TV series) =

British Television series

- Genre: School drama
- Created by: Perrie Balthazar; Matt Evans
- Directed by: Claire Tailyour; Karl Neilson
- Starring: Alex Draper; Lauren Corah; Jayden Hanley; Krish Bassi; Tara Webb; Imogen Baker; Orla McDonagh; Eloise Pennycott
- Country of origin: United Kingdom
- Original language: English
- No. of series: 4
- No. of episodes: 40

Production
- Executive producers: Ali Bryer Carron; Mark Freeland; Perrie Balthazar; Matt Evans
- Producers: Joanna Hanley; Alison B Matthews
- Cinematography: Claudio Cadman
- Editor: Jonathan Lucas
- Running time: 30 mins.
- Production company: BBC Studios Kids & Family Productions

Original release
- Network: BBC Three
- Release: 21 March 2023 – 18 October 2024

Phoenix Rise is a British television series that followed the stories of six students who form an unbreakable bond as they navigate the trials and tribulations of school life in the Midlands. The series was produced by BBC Studios Kids & Family Productions and distributed worldwide by Sinking Ship Entertainment.

The series was launched on BBC iPlayer on 21 March 2023, and had its terrestrial premiere on BBC Three on 24 March 2023. Series 2 premiered on BBC iPlayer and BBC Three on 25 September 2023 while Series 3 premiered on BBC iPlayer on 24 May 2024 and BBC Three on 28 May 2024. Series 4 launched on BBC iPlayer on 18 October 2024 and on BBC Three from Monday 21 October 2024.

== Synopsis ==
A diverse group of teenagers who have been excluded from school begin their first steps back into education.

They must battle against the odds to continue their education, as they deal with difficult life challenges. The teachers mentor them on their way, as they suffer their own dilemmas.

== Cast and characters ==
=== Main ===
- Alex Draper as Billy Hopkins
- Lauren Corah as Summer Bailey
- Jayden Hanley as Darcy Trent
- Krish Bassi as Khaled Khan
- Tara Webb as Rani Rahimi
- Imogen Baker as Leila Rivers
- Orla McDonagh as Rihanna Hopkins
- Eloise Pennycott as Daisy (Series 2–4)

=== Supporting ===
- Mia Tharia as Polly Shah (Recurring series 1–2, guest series 3–4)
- Emmanuella Martins as Bee Rivers (Recurring)
- Jackson Connor as Sam (Recurring series 1–2, guest series 3)
- Joshua Cullinane as Nathan Keys (Recurring)
- Jessal Kullar-Bell as Cassidy Dhillon (Recurring)
- Fintan Buckard as Ethan (Recurring series 1–2)
- Paul Nicholls as Carl Hopkins (Recurring)
- Alicia Charles as Hazel Bailey (Recurring)
- Tyler Fayose as Jamie Stewart (Recurring series 1–3)
- Zita Sattar as Miss Abel (Recurring series 1–2)
- Lauren Crace as Ms Benson (Recurring)
- Marc Hughes as Mr Edwards (Recurring)
- Yasmin Steadman as Becky Phillips (Recurring)
- Ajay Chhabra as Mr. Kothari (Recurring)
- Karen Johal as Noreen Khan (Guest)
- Anil Desai as Reaz Khan (Guest)
- India Lily Cooper as Faith (Recurring series 3–4)
- Aaron Hodgetts as Caleb (Recurring series 3–4)
- Fleur East as Miss Meesha (Recurring series 3–4)
- Ethan Wesley as Matteo (Recurring series 3–4)
- James Burrows as Danny Jacobs (Recurring series 4)
- Milo Panni as Finn (Recurring series 4)

== Production ==
The series was produced by BBC Studios Kids & Family Productions and distributed worldwide by Canadian-based children's company Sinking Ship Entertainment. Perrie Balthazar and Matt Evans, creators, lead writers and executive producers on the series are both from the Midlands, where the series is set. They told the BBC they wanted to “focus on kids who had fallen through the cracks in the system, who were given one last chance to make a success of their time at school" and that they wanted a series that “champions the underdog, shining a light on kids who don't often get a chance in the spotlight on British TV." They met writing on EastEnders and discussed working on a new project together when both were writing on the Channel 4 series Ackley Bridge.

In April 2023, the series was renewed for series three and four by CBBC. The third series aired from 24 May 2024. The fourth season released late 2024, was the last season.

=== Casting ===
Paul Nicholls was cast as Carl, Billy's father, in June 2022 with Orla McDonagh playing Billy's sister Rihanna. Derby-based actress Yasmin Steadman landed the role of pupil federal officer Becky Phillips. Tyler Fayose appears as school headteacher Jamie Stewart. Actor Karen Johal joined the cast in June 2022 portraying Khaled's Mum Noreen Khan. The pupils are played by up-and-coming actors from across the West Midlands with show co-creator Matt Evans saying they wanted to find 'local talent and authentic voices' through an extensive casting process. In September 2023, the BBC announced that Fleur East would join the cast as music teacher Miss Meesha for series three and four.

=== Filming ===
Filming began in June 2022 in Coventry at the former secondary school Woodlands Academy. Locations were all found and managed by Nigel P Harris. Filming also took place in Coventry at the Steakout restaurant on Corporation Street, and Players Entertainment on Silver Street.

=== Music ===
The series features original music from unsigned Coventry bands. The soundtrack, featuring 17 original tracks by West Midlands artists, was released by Demon Music Group on 29 September 2023.

== Episodes ==
=== Series 1 (2023) ===
No. overall	No. in series	Title	Directed by	Written by	Original release date
1	1	"Second Chance"	Claire Tailyour	Perrie Balthazar & Matt Evans	21 March 2023
It’s the first day of term at Phoenix Rise, and for six new pupils it’s a chance to start again. But is it ever that easy?
2	2	"The Boiler Room Six"	Claire Tailyour	Perrie Balthazar & Matt Evans	21 March 2023
Nathan’s secret bullying of Khaled takes a dark new turn, and Khaled must find a way to expose his threats. But will anyone believe him, and will his new friends come to his rescue?
3	3	"King of Cov"	Claire Tailyour	Steph Lacey	21 March 2023
In a bid to beat Brooklands and impress Summer, Darcy takes on a viral video stunt. But has he bitten off more than he can chew?
4	4	"Catch Feels"	Claire Tailyour	Ishy Din	21 March 2023
Darcy’s plans with Summer are ruined when the rest of the gang gate-crash his romantic evening. But when Summer asks Billy out on a date, someone locks him in the Boiler Room.
5	5	"Detention"	Claire Tailyour	Wendy Granditer	21 March 2023
When the gang wind up in detention, Darcy comes up with a plan to escape. But can they make it to the staff room and back without getting caught?
6	6	"Deadbeats and Dropouts"	Claire Tailyour	Wally Jiagoo	21 March 2023
At careers day, Summer is left humiliated in front of Cassidy and her friends, sending her anxiety spiralling. And a school football match makes unlikely allies of Billy and Darcy.
7	7	"All for One"	Claire Tailyour	Jeffrey Aidoo	21 March 2023
Darcy discovers just how bad things are at home for Billy, and he has to decide whether to tell Mr Stewart. Meanwhile an English assignment forces Rani to find her voice.
8	8	"Hit and Run"	Karl Neilson	Perrie Balthazar & Matt Evans	21 March 2023
Billy and Rihanna’s secret is revealed, so they decide to run away. But wracked with guilt about telling Mr Stewart, Darcy hatches a plan to stop them, before it’s too late.
9	9	"A Star is Born"	Karl Neilson	Shazia Rashid	21 March 2023
It’s the day of the school musical, but can Rihanna finally be honest with Leila about her lack of singing talent? Meanwhile a bad day for Khaled leaves him seeking revenge on Mr Stewart.
10	10	"We Are Infinite"	Karl Neilson	Perrie Balthazar & Matt Evans	21 March 2023
It’s the end of term prom, but with her anxiety spiralling, Summer decides to seek help. But will Billy confess his feelings for her before it’s too late?

=== Series 2 (2023) ===
No. overall	No. in series	Title	Directed by	Written by	Original release date
11	1	"New Rules"	Karl Neilson	Perrie Balthazar & Matt Evans	25 September 2023
Darcy hatches a daring plan to steal exam papers.
12	2	"Double Date"	Karl Neilson	Wendy Granditer	25 September 2023
Summer returns to Phoenix Rise but finds that everything has changed.
13	3	"Bad Influence"	Karl Neilson	Tiwa Lade	25 September 2023
Can Leila and Rihanna skip school without getting caught?
14	4	"Dirty Tricks"	Karl Neilson	Ishy Din	25 September 2023
Khaled’s birthday turns into a nightmare as Nathan gets hold of his special present.
15	5	"Into The Wild"	Claire Tailyour	Mark Burt	25 September 2023
Darcy and Daisy lock horns on the school camping trip.
16	6	"Breaking Badly"	Claire Tailyour	Jeffrey Aidoo	25 September 2023
Breaking up with Cassidy is Darcy’s biggest challenge yet.
17	7	"Fire Fifteen"	Claire Tailyour	Perrie Balthazar & Matt Evans	25 September 2023
It’s Cassidy’s party, but she’s not the only one in for a surprise.
18	8	"Exam Hell"	Claire Tailyour	Steph Lacey	25 September 2023
An unexpected arrival sends Billy’s life spiralling out of control.
19	9	"Catfish"	Claire Tailyour	Perrie Balthazar & Matt Evans	25 September 2023
Leila is on a mission to bring down the biggest bully at Phoenix Rise: Miss Abel.
20	10	"The Reckoning"	Claire Tailyour	Perrie Balthazar & Matt Evans	25 September 2023
The gang have to face the consequences of their actions - can they survive?

=== Series 3 (2024) ===
No. overall	No. in series	Title	Directed by	Written by	Original release date
21	1	"Armageddon"	Christiana Ebohon-Green	Perrie Balthazar & Matt Evans	24 May 2024
School has barely begun when the gang find themselves in trouble already. Will they get through it or will newcomers Caleb, Faith and Matteo, tear the group apart?
22	2	"Sassidy"	Christiana Ebohon-Green	Perrie Balthazar & Matt Evans	24 May 2024
Everything is going wrong for Billy – his sister has discovered boys, his best mate has lied to him, and his dad has got a new girlfriend. How is Billy going to juggle it all?
23	3	"Monster-in-Law"	Christiana Ebohon-Green	Perrie Balthazar & Matt Evans	24 May 2024
It’s parents’ evening for the Year 11 students and it’s chaos as usual. Things get heated once the gang head back to Billy’s for an impromptu party, and Darcy and Billy go head to head.
24	4	"Chaos Theory"	Christiana Ebohon-Green	Perrie Balthazar & Matt Evans	24 May 2024
Bad luck seems to follow Caleb around. Can he get through the day when it feels like it’s Caleb versus the world?
25	5	"Boiling Point"	Christiana Ebohon-Green	Jeffrey Aidoo	24 May 2024
Billy is the target of sabotage at the Phoenix Rise open day when someone ruins his cooking. With an idea of who’s responsible, Billy lashes out at them. But has he got it right?
26	6	"Grudge Match"	Christiana Ebohon-Green	Wendy Granditer	24 May 2024
It’s a big day for Darcy in front of the football scout. But when he gets bad news, he tells a lie that has devastating repercussions for someone he cares about.
27	7	"Big Little Lie"	Paul Riordan	Kenny Emson	24 May 2024
Summer’s anxiety is at an all-time high, but will Cassidy help her calm down or make things worse? Meanwhile, Darcy struggles with his guilt over telling a huge lie.
28	8	"Crash and Burn"	Paul Riordan	Wally Jiagoo	24 May 2024
It’s a celebration of diversity and culture at Phoenix Rise, but Faith is set to explode. Meanwhile, a fire breaks out in the boiler room.
29	9	"Family Matters"	Paul Riordan	Perrie Balthazar & Matt Evans	24 May 2024
With Billy’s help, Faith goes in search of her birth mum and gets more than she bargained for. Meanwhile, Darcy returns to school, but will his friends forgive and forget?
30	10	"Cov Rocks"	Paul Riordan	Perrie Balthazar & Matt Evans	24 May 2024
At the Cov Rocks music festival, we say hello to new faces and goodbye to old ones, a mystery is solved, and there’s a whole lot of romance, heartbreak and fun.

=== Series 4 (2024) ===
No. overall	No. in series	Title	Directed by	Written by	Original release date
31	1	"Hostile Takeover"	Paul Riordan	Perrie Balthazar & Matt Evans	18 October 2024
The boiler room has been shut indefinitely. How will the gang survive without their safe haven, especially Billy, who has already got on the wrong side of the new headteacher?
32	2	"Play Dead"	Paul Riordan	Perrie Balthazar & Matt Evans	18 October 2024
Leila is happy to have her dad back - but is he really who he says he is? Meanwhile, the Year 10s are on work experience. There are jokes, pranks and mishaps, and a secret is exposed.
33	3	"Young Offenders"	Karl Neilson	Wendy Granditer	18 October 2024
Billy finally goes to court for stealing the golf buggy. How will Summer’s mum react when she finds out Summer and Billy are back together?
34	4	"Always Be Closing"	Karl Neilson	Racha Sobratee	18 October 2024
Phoenix Rise goes back to the 1990s, there is an unexpected romance, and Leila experiences family heartache.
35	5	"Clueless"	Karl Neilson	Jeffrey Aidoo	18 October 2024
Rihanna is rushed to hospital with a pain in her stomach. Khaled and Cassidy form an unlikely alliance and put on the performance of a lifetime in the playground.
36	6	"An Inspector Calls"	Karl Neilson	Jeremiah Towolawi	18 October 2024
After a fight breaks out between Phoenix Rise and rival school Brooklands, the finger is pointed at Darcy. Can he prove his innocence?
37	7	"Sucker Punch"	Karl Neilson	Perrie Balthazar & Matt Evans	18 October 2024
It’s Summer’s 16th birthday, and things go from bad to worse at her party. Billy gives Summer an unexpected present, which sends shockwaves through their friends and family.
38	8	"Endgame"	Karl Neilson	Perrie Balthazar & Matt Evans	18 October 2024
It’s the final exam for the Year 11s, and there is lots of stress, fun and pranks. Tragedy strikes, and by the end of the day, the gang’s lives will be changed forever.
39	9	"The GOAT"	Karl Neilson	Perrie Balthazar & Matt Evans	18 October 2024
The gang meet in the boiler room and begin packing stuff away for the final time. Emotions run high, and their friendships are tested like never before.
40	10	"We Rise"	Karl Neilson	Perrie Balthazar & Matt Evans	18 October 2024
The boiler room gang will never be the same, but friendship and love will help them through the most difficult of times. And when one chapter ends, another begins.

== Reception ==
Phil Harrison in The Guardian described the show as "a big-hearted coming-of-age drama", adding that the characters "don’t have any supernatural entities to fight; instead, they’re battling with more profound but universal problems such as absent parents, bullying and anger management" and that they were "easy to root for". Rebecca Nicholson's review in The Guardian praised the series for having a “refreshing, soapy confidence”, whilst the choice to “focus on outsiders who have been written off, but who might just be about to get their second chance, gives it a winning underdog mentality” and that the series seemed “all heart, all sincerity” with a “nobody left behind” ethos which was “sweetly affecting”. Barbara Ellen in The Observer concluded that the show "neatly captures the theatre of cruelty that is the school corridor" whilst Orla Thomas in the Radio Times highlighted "the touching relationship between Billy (Alex Draper) and his younger sister Rihanna (Orla McDonagh)" before adding that "the snappy dialogue really brings this to life".

== Broadcast ==
The series premiered in Australia on ABC on 17 November 2023, followed by its debut in Finland on Yle on 23 November 2023. It later aired in Norway on NRK on 7 June 2024 and launched in Belgium on Ketnet on 2 September 2024. It premiered in Sweden on Sveriges Television on 30 September 2024, before debuting in Estonia, Latvia and Lithuania on KidZone Max on 1 September 2025, and in the Netherlands on Videoland on 10 October 2025.

== Accolades ==
The series won the Royal Television Society Midlands award for Best Scripted Series in November 2023. It was also nominated for Best Writer and Breakthrough Performance for Alex Draper. The series received two further nominations in November 2024 for Best Scripted Series and Supporting Acting Performance for Imogen Baker, followed by two additional nominations in November 2025 for Best Children's Series and Breakthrough Performance for Jayden Hanley. It was nominated for Best Live Action Kids Drama at TBI's Content Innovation Awards and won the Mipcom Diversify award in October 2023 for Representation of Diversity in Kids Programming. In March 2025, the series was nominated at the Banff Rockie Awards in the Live Action: Youth category.
