= Birmingham International Carnival =

Biennial event in Birmingham, England

Birmingham International Carnival takes place biennially in August in Birmingham, England. It is a celebration of Caribbean culture, arts, food and entertainment.

Caribbean style carnivals were held in Handsworth Park, Birmingham, from 1984 to 1994. The following year, the carnival moved from the park onto the streets of Handsworth, and became known as the Birmingham Carnival. Since 1999, it has been held as the Birmingham International Carnival in Perry Barr (Perry Park), following a procession from Handsworth's Soho Road.
