= Nicholas Mynheer =

British artist

- Born: 1958 (age 67–68)
- Education: Hornsey College of Art
- Known for: stained glass, paintings, sculptures
- Notable work: religious works
- Website: www.mynheer-art.co.uk/about-nick.html

Nicholas Mynheer (born 1958) is a British glass artist, painter and sculptor. His work is often biblically based, displaying traditional Christian iconography in modern form.

== Life and work ==
Mynheer studied Graphic Design at Hornsey College of Art in London, and worked in advertising. After his conversion to Christianity and influenced by his wife, he turned to religious art. His work was exhibited in Norwich Cathedral (Stations of the Cross, 2017), and can be found in Abingdon School, Birmingham, Lynford, Enstone, and elsewhere. His window in Southwell Minster commemorates the sacrifices made by men and women, at the front and at home, during World War I.

== Selected works ==
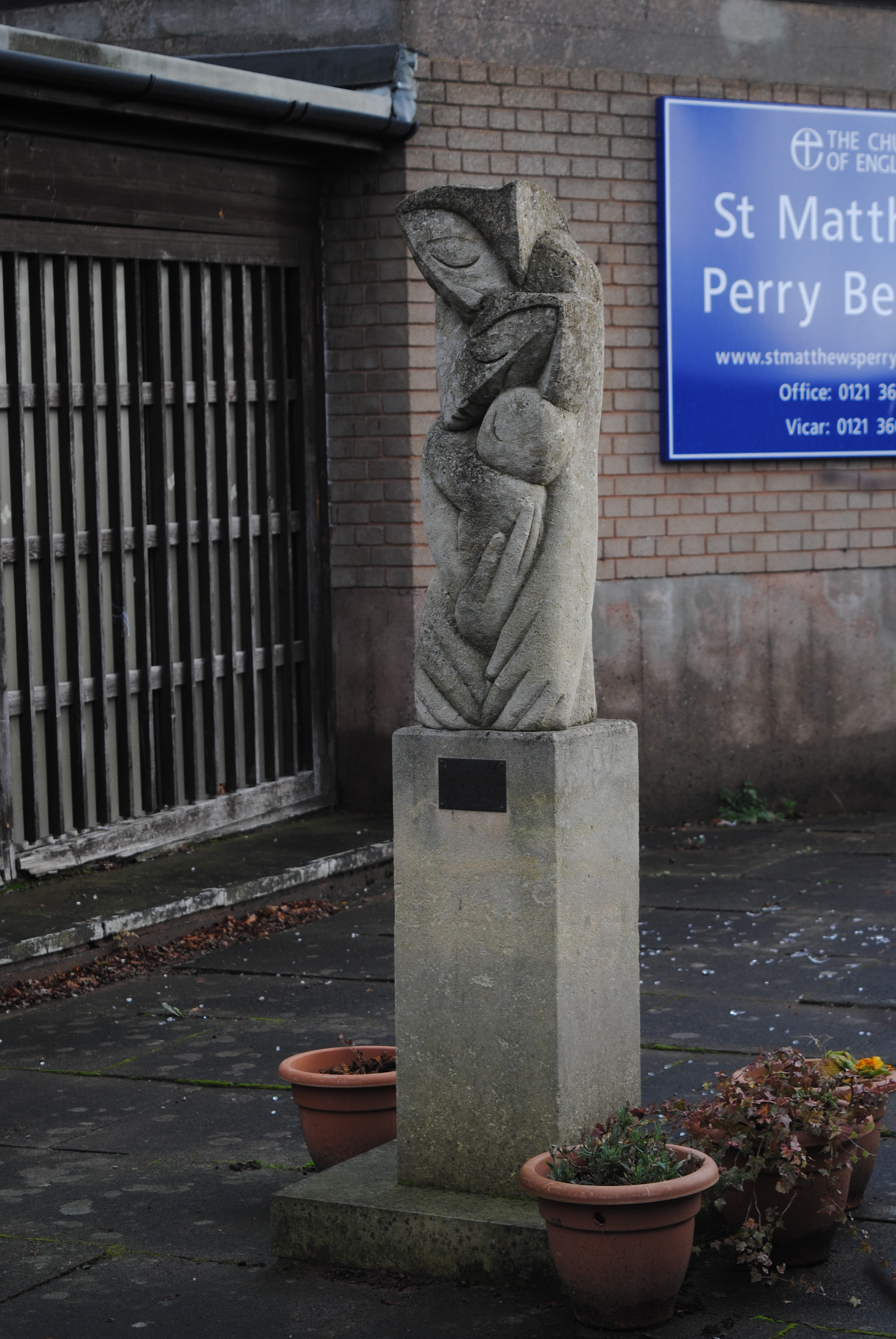
Holy Family (St Matthew's Church, Perry Beeches, Birmingham)

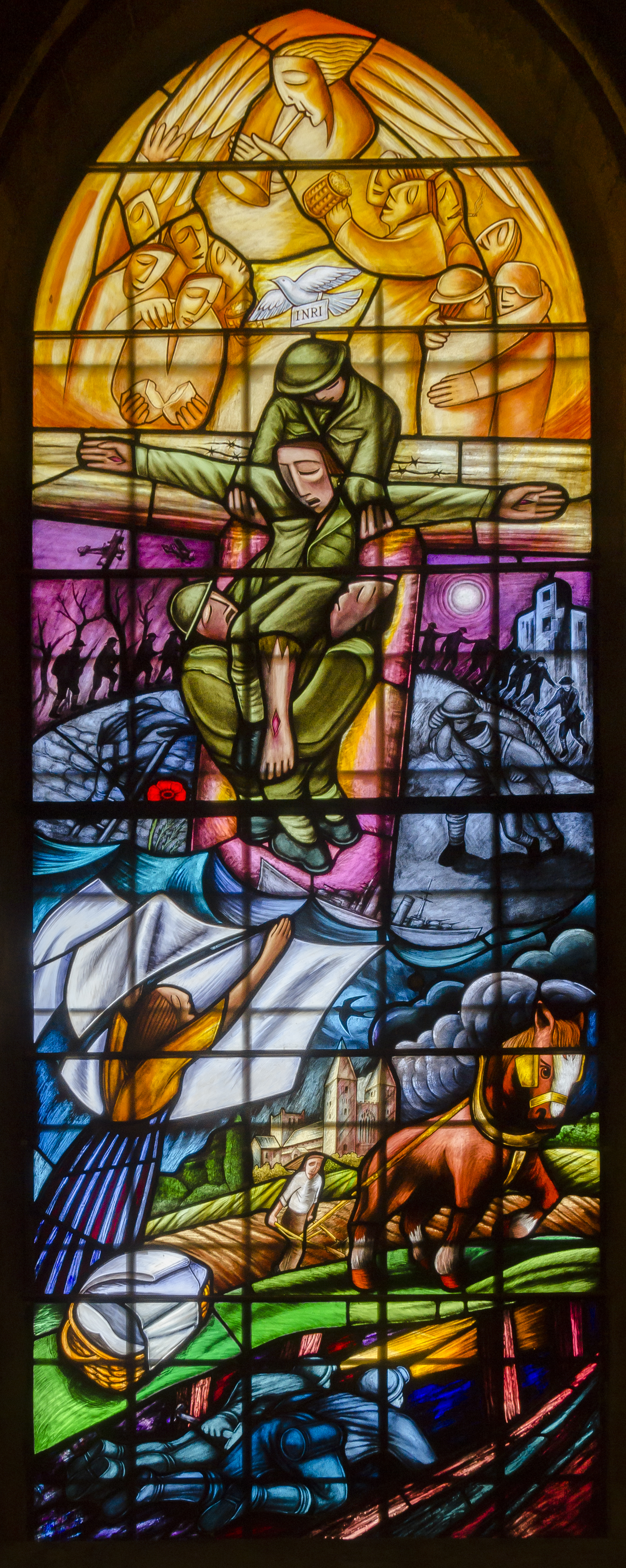
World War I memorial window (Southwell)

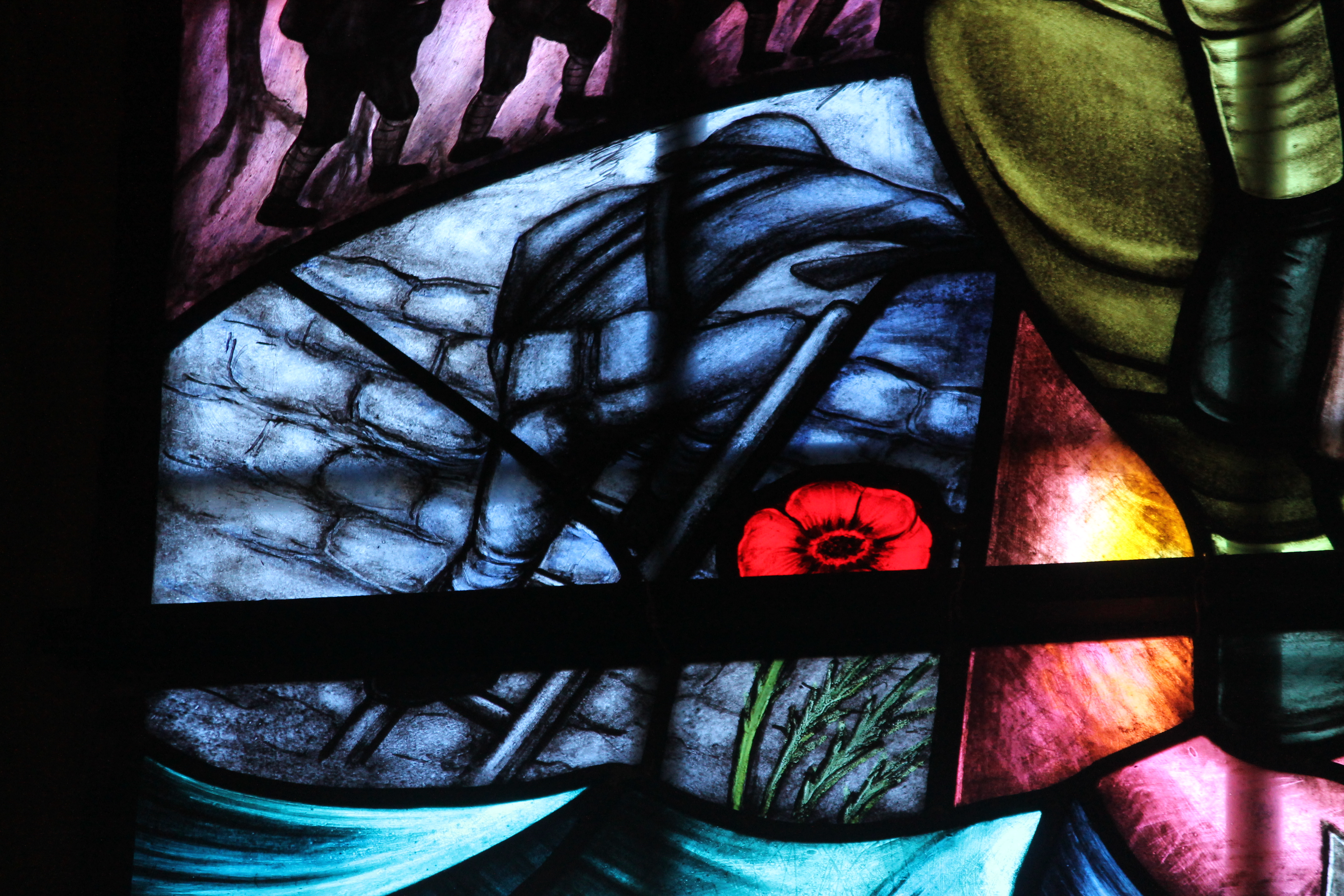
Southwell window (detail)

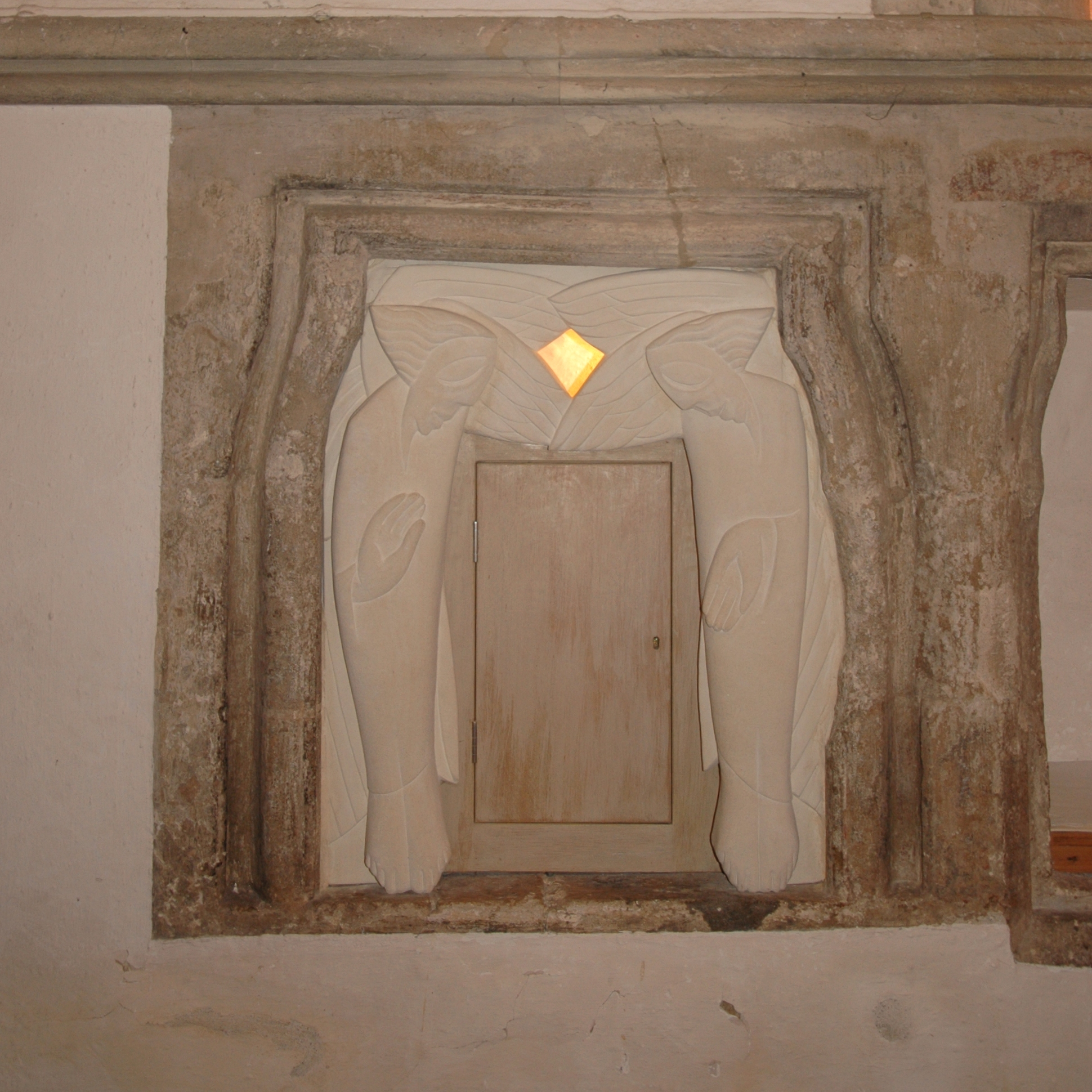
Aumbrey (Iffley)

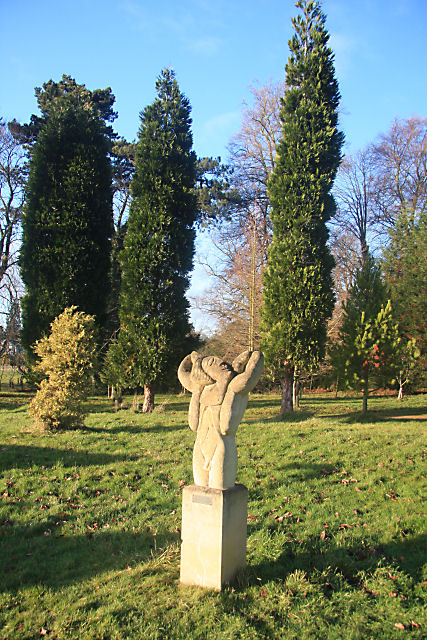
Salutation in Lynford
