= Apple Tree House =

British children's television series

Apple Tree House is a television drama series produced by CBeebies for children ages 1 to 6. It is set on the fictitious Apple Tree House estate in London, and filmed in Bromley-by-Bow. It was produced by Five Apples Ltd for the BBC. Apple Tree House was also available on BBC iPlayer for over a year.

== History ==
The series was originally proposed as an animated series by Rastamouse producers Eugenio Perez and Gregory Boardman. The live action series was created by William Vanderpuye, Maria Timotheou and Akindele Akinsiku, drawing on their own childhood experiences. The CBeebies commissioner said of the show that "The urban setting is important for a lot of children. When you’re a child you do read stories and they are a bit idealistic - this will be more real and more authentic."

The first of 30 episodes was first broadcast on 22 May 2017, and a second series was commissioned that year.

== Cast ==
Principal characters

- Kobi the Caretaker, played by William Vanderpuye
- Mali, played by Aamir Tai
- Sam, played by Miranda Sarfo Peprah
- Bella, played by Summer Jenkins
- David, played by Eden Gough
- Laila, played by Sahana Rameswaren-Kangesan
- Zainab, played by Shaheen Khan
- Patience, played by Andrea Hall
- Flo, played by Alison Lintott
- Katie, played by Rachael Hart
