= St Matthew's Church, Perry Beeches =

St Matthew's Church
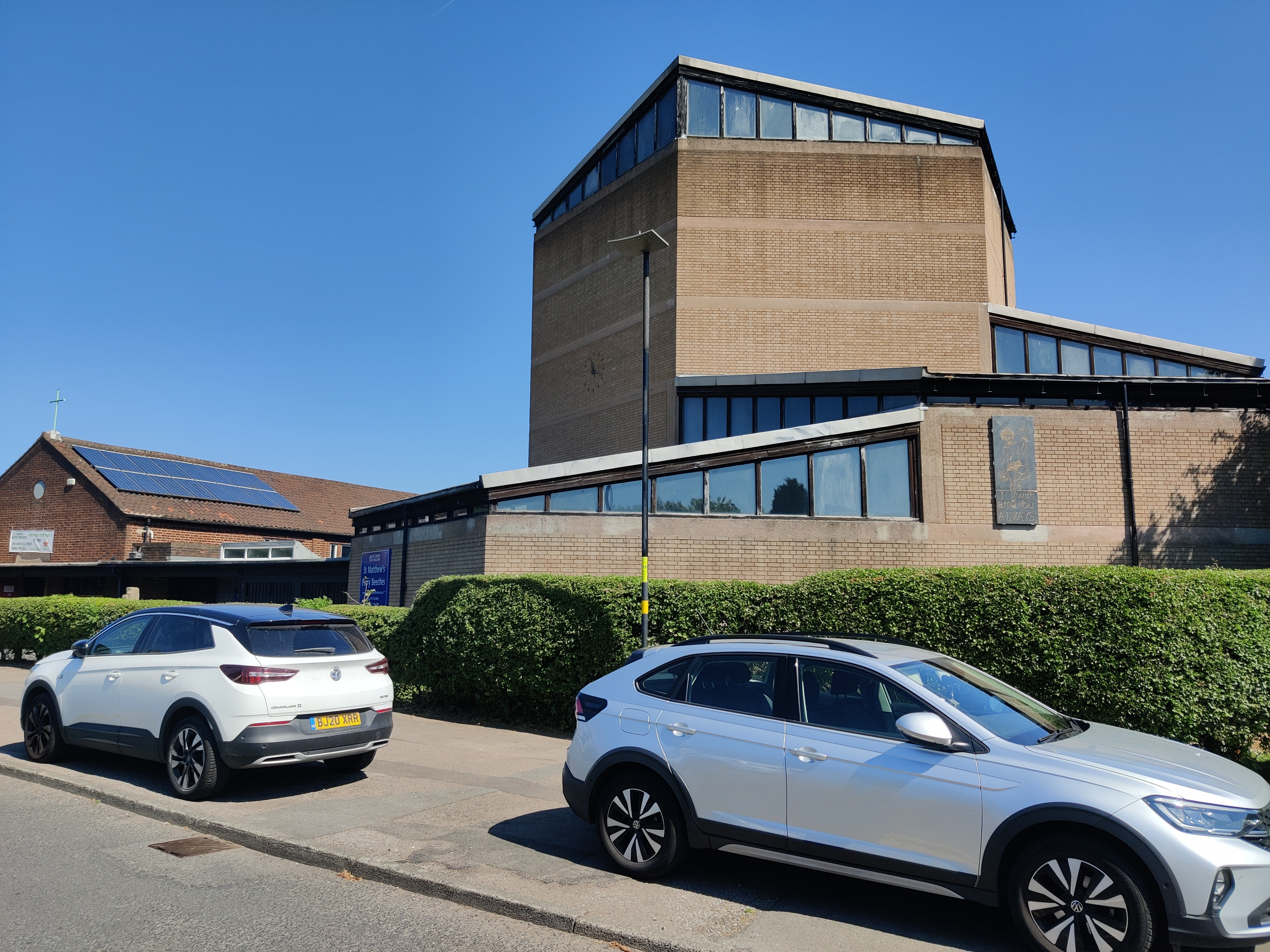
- The church in May 2025, with the old building to the left
- St Matthew's Church
- 52.539307°N 1.895437°W
- Address: Birdbrook Road, Birmingham, B44 8RA
- Country: England
- Denomination: Church of England
- Website: www.stmatthewsperrybeeches.org.uk

History
- Consecrated: 21 September 1964

Architecture
- Architects: Robert Maguire; Keith Murray
- Style: New brutalism
- Groundbreaking: November 1962
- Completed: July 1964
- Construction cost: £29,827

Specifications
- Capacity: 400
- Materials: Brick, concrete

Administration
- Diocese: Birmingham

Clergy
- Vicar: Fr George Reeves

St Matthew's Church is a 20th-century church in the Anglican Diocese of Birmingham, in the Perry Beeches area of Great Barr, Birmingham, England. It was designed by Robert Maguire and Keith Murray and consecrated on 21 September 1964.

== Background ==
St Matthew's parish was established in 1938, in a newly developed residential area that was previously farmland. The first church, known as Christ Church, was a simple, single-storey brick building, completed in 1939, which also served as a community hall. It was retained and is connected to the current church, continuing in its latter function.

Land for the church was donated by Douglas James of the James Motorcycle Company.

== Architecture ==
Building work began in November 1962 and was finished in July 1964, with a total contract price of £29,827 (equivalent to £556,706 in 2025). A foundation stone was laid on 13 June 1963 by the Bishop of Birmingham, Leonard Wilson. The church was consecrated on 21 September 1964.

Its architects were Robert Maguire and Keith Murray. It follows their earlier work on St Paul's, Bow Common.

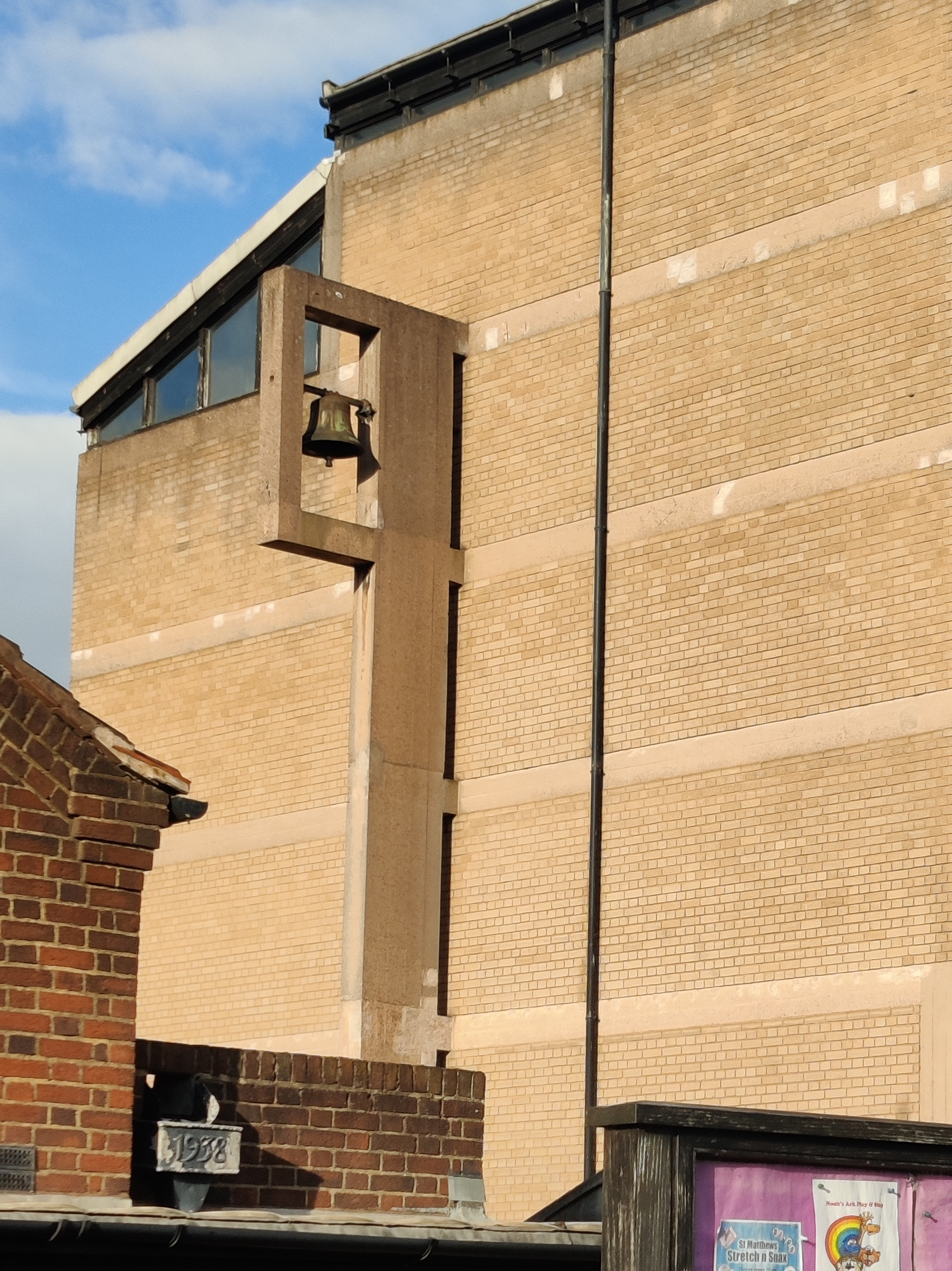
The bell tower. Note also the raincatcher, dated 1938, on the old church building.

The building is constructed of brick and reinforced concrete with a copper roof. Its concrete and mortar have a pinkish hue, caused by the use of locally quarried red sand. It has a bell tower on its western side.

The interior floor plan is an irregular hexagon, arranged to so that both the altar and the blue-brick font are visible to the seated congregation. The church has a floor area of 5,930 square feet (551 m^{2}) and is designed to seat up to 400.

It retains original light fittings by Murray, using Swedish glass, as well as the original wooden bench-pews, pulpit, lectern, priest's chair and desk. The original altar was replaced in 1978 with one made in English ash by students from the nearby Brooklyn Technical College. The church's interior wooden detailing is also in English ash.

A review in the Architects' Journal noted the importance of consultation with its parishioners on the church's design, and said that "the unusual relationship between font and altar is of interest".

An organ was installed in 1969. It was replaced in 2011.

The church was Grade II listed in 1997, giving it legal protection from unauthorised modification or demolition. Historic England described it as "a fine example of the influence of the Liturgical Movement", and called the pulpit "de Stijl-like".

== Worship ==
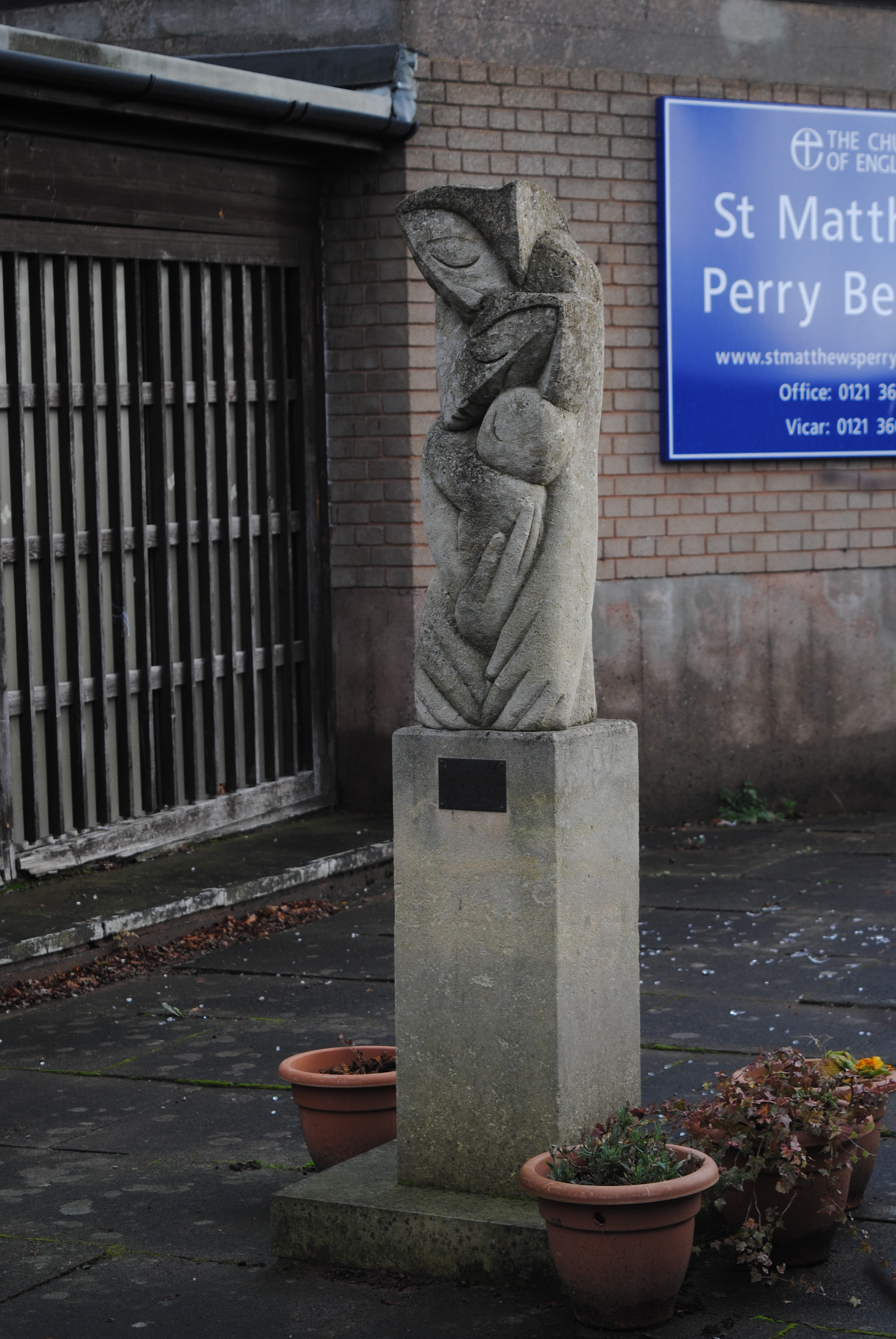
Holy Family by Nicholas Mynheer. The grille to the left is part of the link between the 1960s church (right) and the old church (far left, out of shot)

St Matthew's describes its services as being in the "Modern Catholic" tradition. There are services and events held in the church and parish centre throughout the week, and a Parish Mass every Sunday morning at 10am.

An episode of the BBC Television programme Songs of Praise, recorded at the church on 15 May 1968, was broadcast on 30 June that year. It was presented by Geoffrey Wheeler.

A statue in English limestone by Nicholas Mynheer, Holy Family was erected in the church grounds in 2011. In September 2014, a series of 14 stations of the cross artworks by Mynheer were installed inside the church. Near the altar are two icons by Tatiana Nichita.

== Vicarage ==
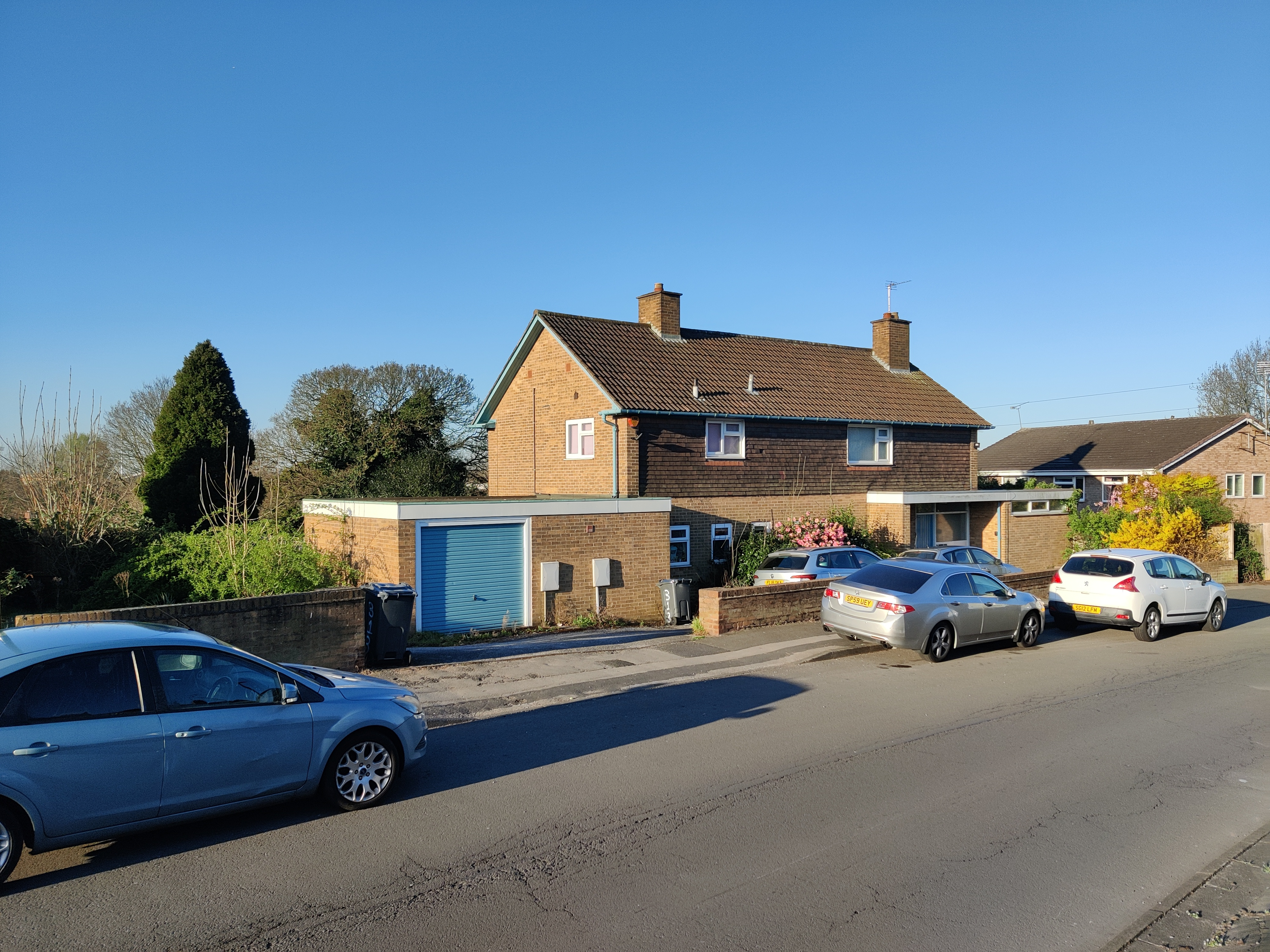
The Vicarage, on Beeches Road

In 1960, a vicarage was constructed on Beeches Road, around a third of a mile from the church.
