= Karl Neilson =

British television director (born 1971)

- Born: 1971 (age 53–54); Liverpool, England
- Occupation: Television director
- Awards: TV Moments 2004

Karl Neilson (born 1971 in Liverpool) is a British television director.

He left school and started work as a van driver for an electrical goods company in Southport. Harbouring an ambition to be a director, he returned to education at the Liverpool Community College. He won a place on the Media Production Bachelor of Arts course at Bournemouth University, and graduated with first class honours in 1996.

Neilson's television career began as an assistant director on EastEnders back in 1998. Alongside EastEnders, he was also the assistant director for Silent Witness. It was then in September 2001 that Neilson appeared officially in the credits as a director, when he directed his first episode of EastEnders. In 2004, a double episode set in the launderette with Dot Cotton telling Den Watts she had cancer won a TV Moments award, named as 'Best Popular Drama Moment' of 2004.

As well as directing for the BBC, he has also directed episodes of The Bill and Family Affairs for TalkbackThames. In 2008 he began directing the new series of Minder for FIVE which was later axed due to poor viewing figures.

In 2015, EastEnders celebrated its thirtieth anniversary with a Live Week. Neilson directed the live week episodes along with the flashback episode. Commenting upon directing the dramatic culmination of the week, Neilson said: "As a director it's an absolute gift of a week, because it's a story where the audience are continually looking for meaning in every line and every reaction. Because of that I was determined to get very specific performances which would steer the story as I wanted it to be steered throughout the week."

== Filmography ==
The following is a table of notable episodes and television shows directed by Neilson.

Show	Episode	Date	Reference
Kat & Alfie: Redwater	Episode 6		
Kat & Alfie: Redwater	Episode 5		
Casualty	"A History of Violence"	6 July 2013	
EastEnders	Episode dated 17 February 2015	17 February 2015	
EastEnders	Episode dated 18 February 2015	18 February 2015	
EastEnders	Thirtieth Anniversary: "Look Back in Anger"	19 February 2015	
EastEnders	Flashback	19 February 2015	
EastEnders	Fully live	20 February 2015	
Family Affairs	Episode dated 2 December 2005	2 December 2005	
Holby City	"The Science of Imaginary Solutions"	3 November 2014	
Holby City	"Chaos in Her Wings"	10 November 2014	
Holby City	"Good Girls Don't Lie"	2 February 2015	
Holby City	"The Beat Goes On"	9 February 2015	
Holby City	"Blue Christmas"	22 December 2015	
Holby City	"Beginnings"	29 December 2015	
Hollyoaks	Episode dated 23 June 2015	23 June 2015	
Hollyoaks	Episode dated 24 June 2015	24 June 2015	
Hollyoaks	Episode dated 25 June 2015	25 June 2015	
Minder	"The Art of the Matter"	18 February 2009	
Minder	"Thank Your Lucky Stars"	4 March 2009	
