= Perry Park (Birmingham) =

Park in Perry Barr, Birmingham, England

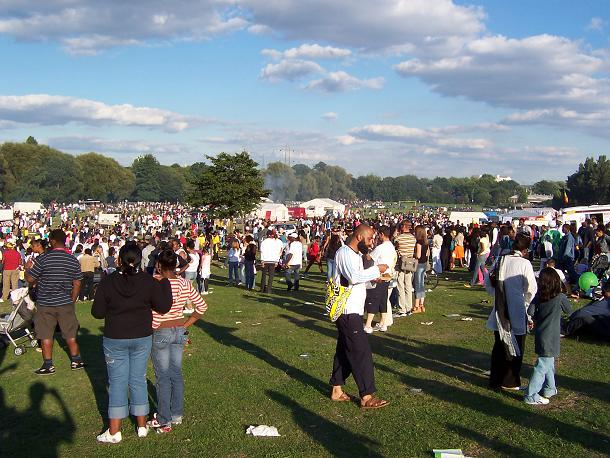
- The scene at the end of the Birmingham International Carnival, 7 August 2005, looking SE towards the Aldridge Road entrance.
- Interactive map of Perry Park
- Location: Birmingham, England
- Coordinates: 52.53033°N 1.90561°W
- Operator: Birmingham City Council

Perry Park is a park in Perry Barr, Birmingham, England, at grid reference SP065925.

The park houses Alexander Stadium and Perry Reservoir (52.5320°N 1.9024°W), a small canal feeder reservoir for the Tame Valley Canal, and is bounded by the canal, the M6 motorway, the A34 and local roads. the Holbrook, a tributary of the River Tame, crosses the park.

It is the venue for the end of the Birmingham International Carnival and in 2004, hosted Radio 1's final One Big Weekend under that name, with performers including Chris Moyles, Natasha Bedingfield, Lostprophets, Joss Stone and Mylo.

It is separate from the similarly named Perry Hall Park, also in Perry Barr.

The popular Birmingham BMX Track or Birmingham Bike Park is located just within the park, off the Aldridge Road entrance.

The park has previously featured crown green bowling, tennis courts, a boat house with rentable rowing boats, plus rugby and football pitches, but these facilities are no longer provided.

Part of the park was used for vehicle parking during the 2022 Commonwealth Games, which were held at Alexander Stadium, requiring the removal of park facilities such as its children's playground. After the games, the park was refurbished.

== World War II ==
During World War II, the site housed a heavy anti-aircraft battery. In 1940 this comprised four 4.5-inch guns and GL Mk. II radar, operated by 346 Battery, 95th Royal Artillery Regiment. In 1945 it had four 3.7-inch Mark VI guns and four 3.7-inch Mark IIIs, operated by 5th Battery, 4th (Mobile) Royal Artillery Regiment.
