= The English Theatre of Hamburg =

Theatre in Hamburg

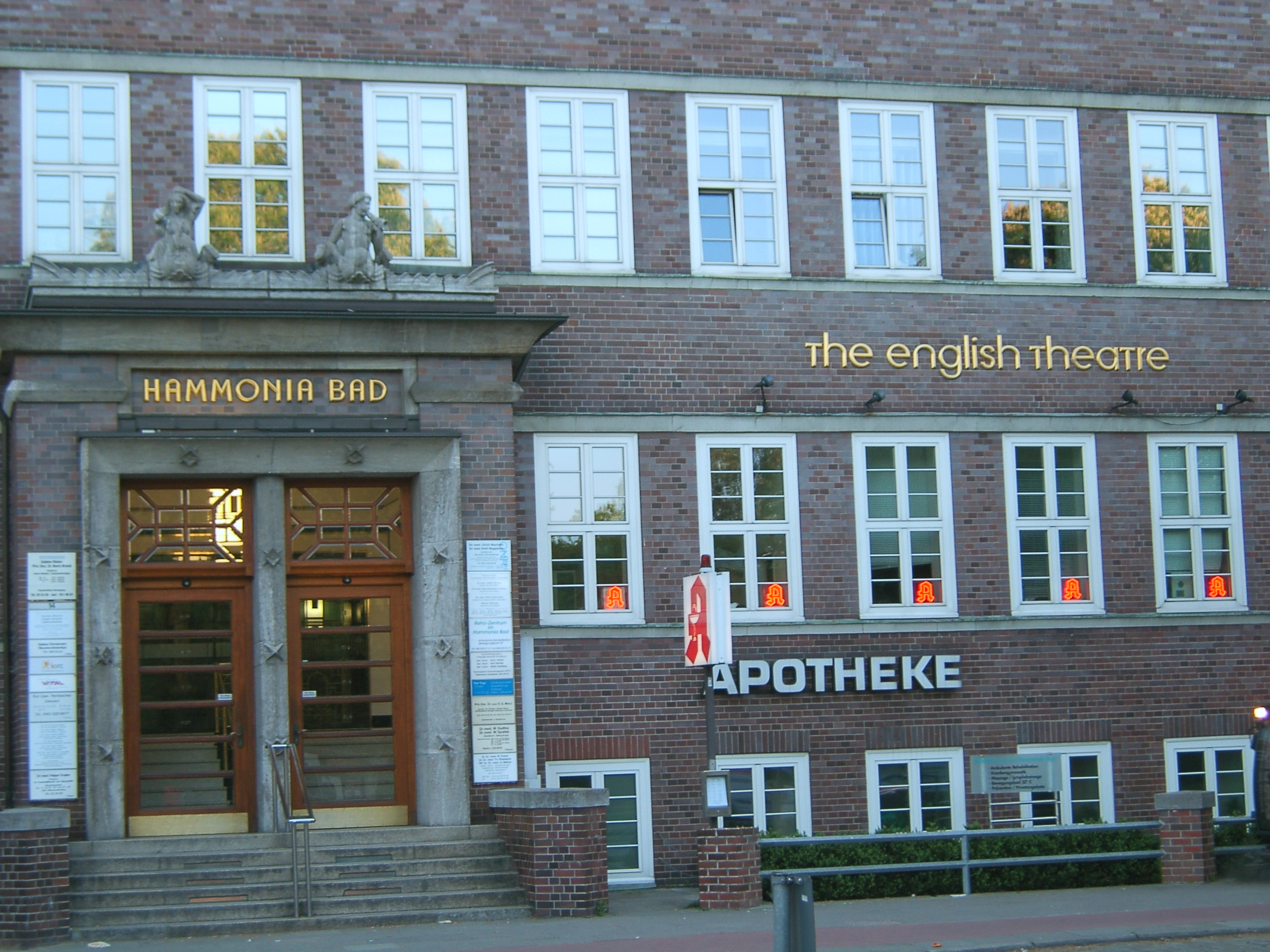
- The English Theatre of Hamburg.
- Interactive map of The English Theatre of Hamburg
- Address: Lerchenfeld 14; Hamburg; Germany
- Coordinates: 53°34′09″N 10°01′43″E
- Capacity: 160

Construction
- Opened: 1976

Website
- http://www.englishtheatre.de/

The English Theatre of Hamburg is a professional theatre in Hamburg, Germany where performances are held in the English language. This private theatre was founded in 1976 by two Americans. It is the oldest professional English language theatre in Germany.

== History of the Theatre ==
The theatre was founded in 1976 by two Americans, Robert Rumpf and Clifford Dean who trained and worked professionally in the United States before coming to Hamburg in the mid-1970s. Together with Artistic Director Paul Glaser they share the general management responsibilities, plan the artistic program and have directed most of the productions of the theatre. Recently they have invited guest directors. All actors are professional trained actors directly from London.

The company presented plays in many different locations in Hamburg until 1979 when a temporary home was found in Hamburg-Altona. Since 1981, "The English Theatre of Hamburg" has had its headquarters in Lerchenfeld 14 in Mundsburg. The building was formerly the "Hammonia Bad", with medicinal baths, and has been a listed building since 19 November 1971.

In 2017, Paul Glaser joined The English Theatre of Hamburg as Artistic Director. Since taking on his position, Glaser has produced and directed a series of new adaptations of British and U.S. plays, including The Picture of Dorian Gray, The Pride, Moonlight and Magnolias, I Love You, You’re Perfect, Now Change, Apologia The Woman in Black, and Death Knell.

In 2022, Glaser wrote and directed his stage adaptation of Charles Dickens’ novel Great Expectations which premiered at The English Theatre of Hamburg in the same year. Far and Away is the song written by Glaser specifically for this production.

In 2023 Glaser directed his new stage adaptation of Arthur Conan Doyle’s crime novel The Hound of the Baskervilles.

In November 2023, Glaser received the Theaterpreis Hamburg – Rolf Mares, for his English Theater production of The Pride, a play by Alexi Kaye Campbell, "... celebrating the diversity and openness of society, which needs to be defended today more than ever."
