= Perry Barr =

Area of Birmingham, England

Coordinates: 52.52494°N 1.90415°W

- Suburb
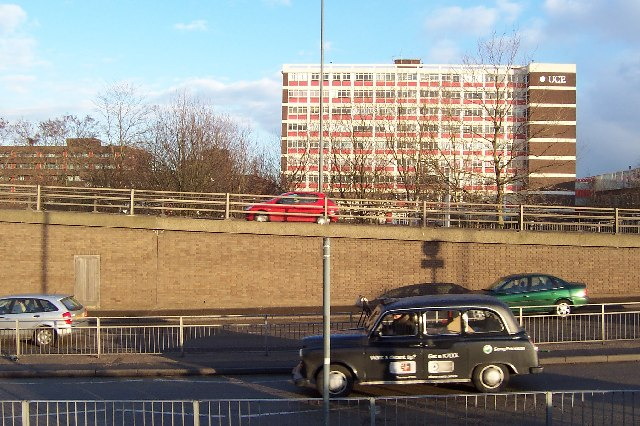

- Location within the West Midlands
- Population: 23,652 (2011Ward)
  - Density: 29.7 per ha
- OS grid reference: SP065919
- Metropolitan borough: Birmingham
- Metropolitan county: West Midlands
- Region: West Midlands
- Country: England
- Sovereign state: United Kingdom
- Post town: BIRMINGHAM
- Postcode district: B42
- Dialling code: 0121
- Police: West Midlands
- Fire: West Midlands
- Ambulance: West Midlands
- UK Parliament: Birmingham Perry Barr

Perry Barr constituency shown within Birmingham (2008)

Perry Barr is a suburban area in north Birmingham, in the county of the West Midlands, England. It is also the name of a council constituency, managed by its own district committee. Birmingham Perry Barr is also a parliamentary constituency; its Member of Parliament between 2001 and 2024 was Labour's Khalid Mahmood. The MP as of July 2024 is Ayoub Khan, who ran as an Independent.

The constituency includes the smaller Perry Barr ward, and the wards of Handsworth Wood, Lozells and East Handsworth, and Oscott, which each elect three councillors to Birmingham City Council.

== Etymology ==
There were four ancient manors in this area (all part of the parish of Handsworth) called Hamstead, Oscott, Perry, and Little (or Parva) Barr. Perry is the area around the parish church and this name is seen on maps but now seldom used. Over time, through confusion or convenience, the whole district came to be known as Perry Barr. "Perry" comes from the Old English "pirige", meaning "pear tree". The derivation of "Barr" is Old Celtic "barro" meaning "hill top". Barr Beacon, the area's highest hill, is in neighbouring Great Barr.

== History ==
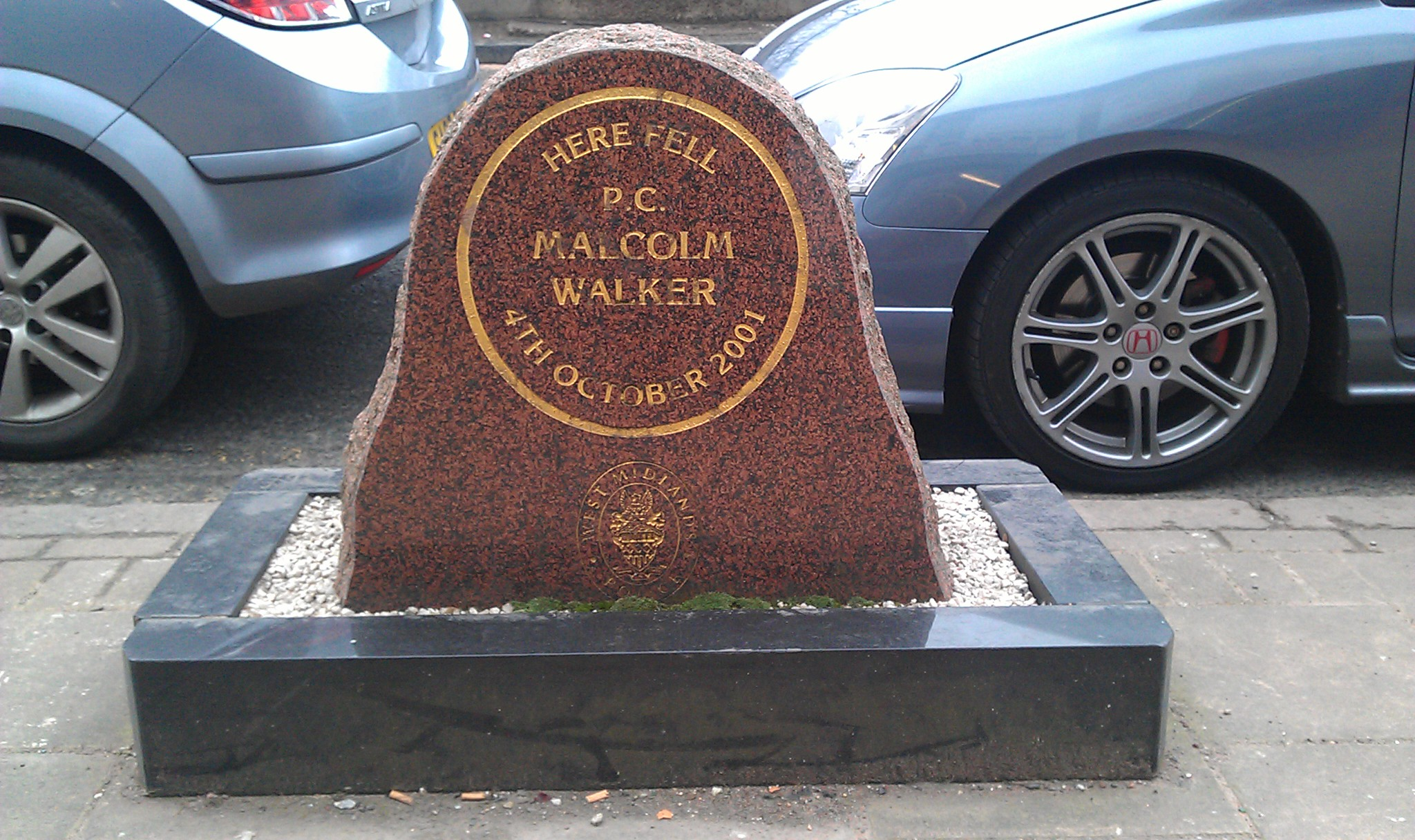
Memorial to PC Malcolm Walker

Perry Barr was originally two separate entities, both mentioned in the Domesday Book as 'Pirio' and 'Barre'. Pirio is recorded as having an estimated population of 35 and Barre with an estimated population of 25. William Fitz-Ansculf is recorded as being the tenant in chief of both manors, and Drogo as the tenant. It is thought that the two manors may have been combined in the Early Middle Ages.

In 1874, Perry Barr established its own institute based on the model of the Birmingham and Midland Institute. In 1878, Henry Irving became the president of the Perry Barr Institute and addressed members of the institute on 6 March 1878. His speech was reprinted in the 13 March release of Theatre and also reprinted onto pamphlets by the institute's members and sold for sixpence to fund the construction of a new building for the institute. It was converted into a Carnegie-funded library in September 1897. In early 2007, this library, ultimately known as Birchfield Community Library, was demolished due to its dilapidated condition. Another library in the area is Tower Hill Library.

Aston Villa opened their Wellington Road ground in Perry Barr in 1876, playing there until 1897.

Perry Barr was formerly a chapelry in the parish of Handsworth, on 26 March 1894 Perry Barr became a separate civil parish. Perry Barr Urban District was an urban district in Staffordshire from 1894 until 1928, when it was largely incorporated into Birmingham and thus also Warwickshire (this included an area which is now considered part of Great Barr). On 1 October 1930 the parish was abolished and merged with Birmingham. In 1921 the parish had a population of 2700. It then became part of the West Midlands in 1974 when Birmingham became a metropolitan borough in the county.

In 1903, Birmingham Crematorium, the City's first, was opened by Sir Henry Thompson, president of the Cremation Society, in Perry Barr at 389 Walsall Road. It has been privately owned, currently by Dignity plc.

In the 1920s, Oscar Deutsch opened his first ever Odeon cinema here. The original cinema is now a conference venue, having also been a bingo hall. The 1920s Perry Barr Stadium on the Aldridge Road hosted greyhound racing and the Birmingham Brummies speedway team until its closure and demolition in 2025. It had a 500-seat capacity, and was refurbished in 2004. It was the former home of the Birchfield Harriers, whose Art Deco-styled bas relief badge it still carried. The Harriers now operate from nearby Alexander Stadium.

Aston Technical College (later renamed North Birmingham Technical College) moved to a new site in Perry Barr in the late 1960s, and was incorporated into the creation of Birmingham Polytechnic (now Birmingham City University) in 1971. The site had formerly been the location of Birchfield Road Primary School and Birchfield Road Secondary Modern School. Two of the college's buildings existed as part of the university's City North Campus, but closed in 2018 when the site was again levelled and construction began on accommodation for athletes competing in the Birmingham Commonwealth Games 2022 in Perry Park. Delays in construction due to the Covid 19 pandemic meant that the accommodation was not completed in time to be used for this purpose.

There is a mall-style shopping centre in the district known as "One Stop" Shopping Centre. This was built in the early 1990s, replacing a previous 1960s-era shopping centre. To facilitate the 1990s construction, a length of the River Tame was diverted and canalised. A Wetherspoons pub, the Arthur Robertson, opened later is named after Arthur Robertson, the Birchfield Harriers' first Olympic gold medallist (1908).

A memorial to PC Malcolm Walker, of the West Midlands Police, is situated outside shops on the city-bound side of Birchfield Road. He died on 4 October 2001, when his motorcycle was struck during a police pursuit.

The site of the former Perry Hall is now Perry Hall Park. Perry Park hosted the Birmingham Carnival in 2005.

== Transport ==
Major roads in the ward and constituency include the M6 motorway and the A34. The A4040 and A34 roads cross at Perry Barr, the former carrying the Birmingham Outer Circle bus routes. In addition the A453 towards Sutton Coldfield begins at Perry Barr. Bus routes operated by the National Express West Midlands Perry Barr bus garage in the area include Nos 11A, 11C, 33, 46, 51, 54, 68A, 68C, 907, 907A, 936, 937, 937A (evenings and Sundays), 952, 997, and 997E (towards Pheasey).

To the south-west of the ward is the Walsall line, part of the old Grand Junction Railway, which has two railway stations within the boundaries of the ward; Hamstead railway station and Perry Barr railway station. The latter, opened in 1837, is one of the oldest stations in the country to remain on its original site. It has been rebuilt several times, most recently in 2022.

The Tame Valley Canal bisects the ward, with boats from Salford Junction, under Gravelly Hill Interchange climbing the 13-flight Perry Barr Locks towards Hamstead and on to Rushall Junction. There is a feeder reservoir, Perry Reservoir, in Perry Park.

The River Tame passes through the area and is crossed by several bridges, including Perry Bridge, a scheduled ancient monument of 1711, on the line of the Roman Ryknild Street, and its 1932 Art Deco replacement carrying the Aldridge Road. The old bridge appears on the badge of nearby Handsworth Grammar School. A stream, the Holbrook, originating on the slopes of Barr Beacon, flows into the river just upstream from the bridge. The area around the bridge is known as Holford.

== Sport ==
The Alexander Stadium is in Perry Barr. It is an international athletics venue which hosted the athletics events of the 2022 Commonwealth Games. The stadium will host the 2026 European Athletics Championships. Aston Manor Cricket Club is based in Perry Barr. Both venues are located on Church Road, adjacent to Perry Park.

The Hub on Holford Drive is home to Continental Star F.C., as well as Continental Star Cricket, Continental Stars Table Tennis Club, local tennis clubs, and Aston Amateur Boxing Club.

== Ward ==
The Perry Barr ward is part of the Birmingham, Perry Barr parliamentary constituency. Following boundary changes in 2004, the eastern edge of the ward follows the M6 motorway from Spaghetti Junction to junction 7 at Great Barr, including parts of the communities of Witton, Aston, Perry Barr and Great Barr.

As of 2026, the two councillors representing Perry Barr on Birmingham City Council are Morriam Jan and James Hinton, both of the Liberal Democrats. In a 2017 by-election, Morriam Jan, elected as a Liberal Democrat, became the first councillor of South Asian origin elected for the ward.

Before 1990, the ward had a strong tendency towards the Conservative Party. No single party held all the seats in the ward between 1990 and 2004. The Liberal Democrats took a clean sweep at the 2004 Council Elections in which all seats were contested, but only after three recounts. In 2006, Hamilton increased her personal majority from 31 to more than 1,500, and the party went on to win every election in the ward until boundary changes in 2018.

The ward had Labour representation for a period, from 1995 till 2004 following the election of Mike Leddy (1995–2003), along with the defection of Ron Whitehouse from the Liberal Democrats to the Labour Party (2000–2004).

For the 2018 and any subsequent elections the ward was reduced in size to two councillors and parts of the former Aston ward, included in 2004, were returned to a new Aston ward. The new Perry Barr ward includes Witton Cemetery and the Moor Lane Sports Ground.

=== Election winners ===
- 1986 – Conservative
- 1987 – Conservative
- 1988 – Conservative
- 1990 – Liberal Democrat
- 1991 – Liberal Democrat
- 1992 – Conservative
- 1994 – Liberal Democrat
- 1995 – Labour
- 1996 – Liberal Democrat
- 1998 – Liberal Democrat
- 1999 – Labour
- 2000 – Liberal Democrat (defected to Labour within 12 months)
- 2002 – Liberal Democrat
- 2003 – Liberal Democrat
- 2004 – 3 x Liberal Democrat (following boundary changes)
- 2006 – Liberal Democrat – Karen Hamilton
- 2007 – Liberal Democrat – Jon Hunt
- 2008 – Liberal Democrat – Ray Hassall
- 2010 – Liberal Democrat – Karen Hamilton
- 2011 – Liberal Democrat – Jon Hunt
- 2012 – Liberal Democrat – Ray Hassall
- 2014 – Liberal Democrat – Karen Trench (previously Hamilton)
- 2015 – Liberal Democrat – Jon Hunt
- 2016 - Liberal Democrat – Ray Hassall (deceased March 2017)
- 2017 (by-election) – Liberal Democrat – Morriam Jan
- 2018 – 2 x Liberal Democrat (following boundary changes) – Jon Hunt and Morriam Jan

== Demographics and notable residents ==
The 2001 Population Census recorded that 22,704 people lived in Perry Barr. 28.2% (6,410) of the ward's population was represented by ethnic minorities, compared with 29.6% for Birmingham in general. According to the UK Census 2021, 69.4% of Perry Barr and South Hamstead were non–White ethnicities.

British musician Steve Winwood was a choirboy at St John the Evangelist Church of England parish church in Perry Barr.

== See also ==
- Perry Barr Reservoir
- One Stop Shopping Centre
