= Grade II* listed buildings in Newcastle-under-Lyme (borough) =

There are over 20,000 Grade II* listed buildings in England. This page is a list of these buildings in the district of Newcastle-under-Lyme in Staffordshire.

== Newcastle-under-Lyme ==
Name	Location	Type	Completed (Note: The date given is the date used by Historic England as significant for the initial building or that of an important part in the structure's description.)	Date designated	Grid ref. (Note: Sometimes known as OSGB36, the grid reference is based on the British national grid reference system used by the Ordnance Survey.) Geo-coordinates	Entry number (Note: The "List Entry Number" is a unique number assigned to each listed building and scheduled monument by Historic England.)	Image
Church of St James	Audley Rural, Newcastle-under-Lyme	Parish Church	c. 1300	17 November 1966	SJ7989450888; 53°03′18″N 2°18′05″W	1038613	Church of St James More images
Hall O' the Wood	Balterley, Newcastle-under-Lyme	House	Late 16th century	2 December 1952	SJ7680050426; 53°03′02″N 2°20′51″W	1374892	Hall O' the Wood
Betley Court, Dovecote, and Forecourt Walls and Gates	Betley, Newcastle-under-Lyme	House	1716	13 September 1976	SJ7535048398; 53°01′56″N 2°22′08″W	1038584	Betley Court, Dovecote, and Forecourt Walls and Gates More images
Betley Old Hall	Betley, Newcastle-under-Lyme	Farmhouse	Late C16/early 17th century	2 December 1952	SJ7520249066; 53°02′18″N 2°22′17″W	1038588	Upload Photo
Model Farm Complex South West of Betley Old Hall	Betley, Newcastle-under-Lyme	Watermill	Early 19th century	22 April 1988	SJ7513849011; 53°02′16″N 2°22′20″W	1188395	Upload Photo
Church of St John the Baptist	Keele, Newcastle-under-Lyme	Parish Church	Medieval	17 November 1966	SJ8098345218; 53°00′14″N 2°17′05″W	1377612	Church of St John the Baptist More images
Keele Hall	Keele University Campus, Keele, Newcastle-under-Lyme	House	1856-61	2 December 1952	SJ8196944769; 53°00′00″N 2°16′12″W	1377615	Keele Hall More images
Church of St John the Baptist	Ashley, Loggerheads, Newcastle-under-Lyme	Tower	1350	17 November 1966	SJ7629036437; 52°55′29″N 2°21′15″W	1377618	Church of St John the Baptist More images
Church of St Mary	Mucklestone, Loggerheads, Newcastle-under-Lyme	Tower	Mid-14th century	17 November 1966	SJ7255237356; 52°55′58″N 2°24′35″W	1377621	Church of St Mary More images
Oakley Hall & Pair of Sphinxes Framing East Entrance	Oakley, Loggerheads, Newcastle-under-Lyme	House	Post 1710	2 December 1952	SJ7013436943; 52°55′45″N 2°26′45″W	1205760	Oakley Hall & Pair of Sphinxes Framing East Entrance More images
Willoughbridge Lodge	Mucklestone, Loggerheads, Newcastle-under-Lyme	Farmhouse	1985	17 November 1966	SJ7403538768; 52°56′44″N 2°23′16″W	1205676	Upload Photo
The Old Hall	Poolside, Madeley, Newcastle-under-Lyme	House	Post 1599	2 December 1952	SJ7734444628; 52°59′55″N 2°20′20″W	1206169	The Old Hall More images
Church of St Peter	Maer, Newcastle-under-Lyme	Parish Church	Late C12/early 13th century	17 November 1966	SJ7926838329; 52°56′31″N 2°18′36″W	1206359	Church of St Peter More images
Gatehouse, Flanking Walls and Bollards to Maer Hall	Maer, Newcastle-under-Lyme	Wall	Late 18th century	14 May 1985	SJ7924238292; 52°56′30″N 2°18′37″W	1027834	Gatehouse, Flanking Walls and Bollards to Maer Hall
Lea Head Manor	Maer, Newcastle-under-Lyme	House	1671	2 December 1952	SJ7506442023; 52°58′30″N 2°22′22″W	1027829	Upload Photo
Butterton Grange Farmhouse	Whitmore, Newcastle-under-Lyme	Farmhouse	1816	14 May 1985	SJ8430842111; 52°58′34″N 2°14′06″W	1027842	Butterton Grange Farmhouse
Church of St Mary and All Saints	Whitmore, Newcastle-under-Lyme	Church	12th century	17 November 1966	SJ8103441032; 52°57′59″N 2°17′02″W	1280181	Church of St Mary and All Saints More images
Church of St Thomas	Butterton, Whitmore, Newcastle-under-Lyme	Parish Church	1844	14 May 1985	SJ8318942242; 52°58′38″N 2°15′07″W	1353782	Church of St Thomas More images
Old Stable Block	Whitmore, Newcastle-under-Lyme	Stable	Late C16/early 17th century	17 November 1966	SJ8103541258; 52°58′06″N 2°17′02″W	1027845	Old Stable Block
Church of St George	Newcastle-under-Lyme	Church	1828	21 October 1949	SJ8505946336; 53°00′51″N 2°13′27″W	1219946	Church of St George More images
Church of St Giles	Newcastle-under-Lyme	Tower	13th century	21 October 1949	SJ8467846050; 53°00′42″N 2°13′47″W	1297603	Church of St Giles More images
Church of St Margaret	Wolstanton, Newcastle-under-Lyme	Church	Medieval	21 October 1949	SJ8564048062; 53°01′47″N 2°12′56″W	1196517	Church of St Margaret More images
