= Loggerheads and Whitmore (ward) =

Coordinates: 52.986°N 2.284°W

Loggerheads and Whitmore ward was a ward in the Borough of Newcastle-under-Lyme, in the county of Staffordshire, England. It covered, amongst others, the villages of Knighton, Hales, Mucklestone, Ashley, Loggerheads and Whitmore. In 2011 it had a population of 6948.

The Councillors for this ward since 3 May 2012 are Ashley Howells, David Loades and Tracey Peers. All three represent the Conservative Party on Newcastle-under-Lyme Borough Council.
