= Listed buildings in Loggerheads, Staffordshire =

Loggerheads is a civil parish in the district of Newcastle-under-Lyme, Staffordshire, England. It contains 75 buildings that are recorded in the National Heritage List for England. Of these, four are listed at Grade II*, the middle of the three grades, and the others are at Grade II, the lowest grade. The parish contains the villages of Loggerheads, Ashley, Hales, Knighton, and Mucklestone, and the surrounding countryside. Most of the listed buildings are houses, cottages, farmhouses, and farm buildings, the earlier of which are timber framed. The Shropshire Union Canal passes through the western part of the parish, and the listed buildings associated with this include bridges, locks, two mileposts, and an aqueduct. The other listed buildings include churches, memorials in churchyards, a well house, two country houses and associated structures, a folly, a bridge, a sewer ventilation pipe and six road mileposts.

== Key ==
Grade	Criteria
II*	Particularly important buildings of more than special interest
II	Buildings of national importance and special interest

== Buildings ==
Name and location	Photograph	Date	Notes	Grade
St John the Baptist's Church, Ashley; 52.92480°N 2.35415°W		c. 1350	The oldest part of the church is the tower, which was remodelled in the 17th century, and the rest of the church was rebuilt in 1860–62. It is built in pink sandstone and has a tile roof. The church consists of a nave, north and south aisles, a chapel at the east end of the south aisle, a south porch, a chancel, and a west tower embraced by the aisles. There is a choir vestry to the west of the tower, and a priest's vestry to the east of the aisle chapel. The tower has three stages, set-back buttresses, an embattled parapet with corner pinnacles and gargoyles, and a brass weathercock. On the west front is a pedestal with a statue and a gabled canopy.	II*
St Mary's Church, Mucklestone; 52.93289°N 2.40974°W		Mid 14th century	The oldest part of the church is the tower, the rest of the church was rebuilt in 1790, and again in 1883 by Lynam and Rickman in Decorated style. It is built in sandstone and the roofs are partly tiled and partly slated. The church consists of a nave and a chancel in one unit, a north aisle, a south porch, and a west tower. The tower is tall, with three stages, angle buttresses, a west window, and an embattled parapet with corner pinnacles, and a gargoyle on the east side. In the aisle are three slate-hung gabled dormers.	II*
Willoughbridge Lodge; 52.94567°N 2.38782°W	—	Mid 16th century	A hunting lodge, later a farmhouse, it was extended later in the 16th century, and again in the 19th century. The main part is in sandstone, one of the 19th-century extensions is in red brick, and the roofs are tiled. The earliest part is a square tower flanked by gabled wings, at right angles are later gabled wings, and the 19th-century long parallel extensions are at the rear. The tower has three stages over a cellar, stepped buttresses, an embattled parapet, and a square stair turret with an ogee top and a globe finial. The rest of the building has two storeys, the windows in the earlier parts are mullioned with hood moulds, and in the 19th-century extension are casement windows.	II*
The Brookhouse, Knighton; 52.96014°N 2.40598°W	—	Late 16th or early 17th century (probable)	The house, which has been moved from its original site, is timber framed on a sandstone plinth, the rear is clad in purplish brown brick, and it has a tile roof. There is one storey, an attic and a cellar, and three bays. On the front is a sandstone porch, the windows are casements, and there are three gabled dormers. Inside, there is exposed timber framing.	II
102 London Road, Knighton; 52.95848°N 2.40398°W	—	17th century (probable)	Three cottages, later combined into a house, they were altered and extended in the 19th century. The original part has a timber framed core, it is encased in brown brick, the extension to the right is in purplish brick with a dentilled eaves cornice, and the roof is tiled. There are two storeys, the original part has three bays, and the windows are casements with projecting keystones. In the original part are two doorways with bracketed heads, and the extension contains a bay window with a doorway to the right. Inside, there is an inglenook fireplace.	II
Ashley Farmhouse; 52.92621°N 2.35699°W	—	17th century	The farmhouse, which was later altered, is timber framed on a painted plinth of sandstone and brick, the gable ends are in brick and painted to resemble timber framing, and the roof is tiled. There are two storeys and an attic, and the original part has three bays. On the front is a gabled brick porch, and the windows are casements. At the rear are two parallel ranges at right angles. Inside, the timber framing is largely intact.	II
Audley's Cross Farmhouse and farm buildings 52.91638°N 2.42497°W	—	17th century (probable)	The farmhouse, which has been altered and extended, is in red brick, with a dentilled eaves cornice and tiled roofs. There are two storeys, a front of five bays, the outer bays projecting to form square pavilions with hipped roofs and ball finials, and two parallel ranges at right angles to the rear. The windows are casements, and there are hipped half-dormers in the upper floor. The attached farm buildings form ranges around a farmyard. They include a cowhouse, and a cartshed with a granary above, that have square corner blocks with hipped roofs and ball finials.	II
Clod Hall; 52.91080°N 2.45588°W		17th century	The cottage was extended to the rear in the 20th century. The original part is timber framed with painted brick infill on a plastered stone plinth, the extension is in brick and partly weatherboarded, and the roof is thatched. The original part has one storey and an attic and two bays, and the rear extension has two storeys. The windows are casements, and there are two raking dormers.	II
Cottage of Content, 48 and 49 School Road; 52.92572°N 2.35465°W	—	17th century (probable)	A pair of cottages, later combined into one, it is timber framed with painted brick infill and a tile roof. There is one storey and an attic, three bays, and a later rear brick extension. On the front is a gabled porch, the windows are casements, and there are three gabled dormers.	II
Home Farmhouse; 52.90041°N 2.45930°W	—	17th century (probable)	The farmhouse has been dismantled, and it was moved to its present site in the early 1900s. It is timber framed with rendered brick infill, on a sandstone plinth, and has a stone slate roof. There are two storeys, and an L-shaped plan, with a hall range and a cross-wing, brick extensions added later in the angle, and a single-storey lean-to. The windows are casements.	II
Johnson's Wood Farmhouse; 52.88886°N 2.42663°W	—	17th century (probable)	A farmhouse, later a private house, it was remodelled in the 18th century and later extended. It has a timber framed core, and is in red brick on a sandstone plinth, with quoins, a dentilled eaves cornice, and a tile roof. There is one storey and an attic, three bays, and a rear outshut. The windows are casements with segmental heads, and there are three gabled dormers. Inside there is an inglenook fireplace, and exposed timber framing.	II
Old Rectory; 52.93345°N 2.41015°W	—	17th century	The rectory, later a private house, was extended and remodelled in about 1730, and in about 1820–30. It has a timber framed core, with cladding and extensions in red brick, and tile roofs. There are two storeys, attics and cellars, and three ranges, forming a U-shaped plan. The east front is in two parts, and contains sash windows, casement windows and gabled dormers. The south front has five bays, pilasters, a floor band, a moulded eaves cornice, sash windows, and a doorway with a pointed head and Gothic tracery. The west front has three bays, and contains a full-height bow window with a conical roof.	II
Well house, Willoughbridge Wells; 52.95297°N 2.38050°W	—	Mid-17th century (probable)	The well house is in sandstone, with a moulded cornice, and without a roof. It has a square plan and on each side are two openings with moulded surrounds.	II
127 Smithy Lane, Knighton; 52.95948°N 2.40445°W		Mid to late 17th century	A timber framed cottage with painted brick infill on a sandstone plinth, with a tile roof. There is one storey and an attic, three bays, and a rear brick extension. The windows are casements, and there are two gabled dormers, all with lattice glazing. The doorway to the right has barley-sugar twisted colonettes.	II
Oakley Hall and pair of sphinxes 52.92907°N 2.44569°W	—	1710	A country house in red brick on a sandstone plinth, with stone dressings, rusticated quoins, a string course, a moulded eaves cornice, and a parapet. There are two storeys and cellars, and a symmetrical front of eleven bays, the two end bays projecting slightly. Flanking the middle three bays are giant pilasters with Corinthian capitals, and above them is a pediment containing festooned garlands. The central doorway has a fanlight and a segmental pediment on console brackets. The windows are sashes with moulded surrounds and projecting keystones. The window above the doorway has a surround decorated with a grotesque lion's head, garlands and volutes. Flanking the main entrance is a pair of sphinx-like figures with cast iron lamps.	II*
Gate Piers, Oakley Hall; 52.92889°N 2.44577°W	—	c. 1710	The gate piers are attached to the southeast corner of the hall. They are in red brick with moulded sandstone capping. The piers have a square plan and are surmounted by ball finials.	II
Grotto, Oakley Hall; 52.92986°N 2.44495°W	—	Early to mid 18th century (probable)	The grotto, which is approached down a flight of steps, is cut out of natural sandstone and is faced in stone. It consists of a round-headed recess, surrounded by pilasters and a moulded cornice, and contains a bench cut from the natural stone. To the right of the steps is a round-headed niche.	II
Broomhall Grange; 52.90589°N 2.46630°W	—	Mid 18th century	The farmhouse, which was later extended, is in red brick with yellow brick headers, and a tile roof. There are two storeys and an attic, and an L-shaped plan. The long range has a dentilled eaves cornice, and both ranges have floor bands. The doorway has a cambered head, and the windows are casements.	II
Ice house, Oakley Hall; 52.92850°N 2.44616°W	—	Mid 18th century (probable)	The ice house is in red brick and sandstone. Steps from the right lead down to a round-arched entrance with voussoirs and a coped gable. The short tunnel is lined with brick, the cavity is egg-shaped, lined in stone and with a brick dome.	II
Outbuildings and pigsties, Old Rectory; 52.93371°N 2.40963°W	—	Mid 18th century (probable)	The outbuildings consist of a brewhouse, a bakery, a wash-house, and a laundry, and the pigsties were added to the north end in the 19th century. The buildings are in red brick with a tile roof, and have one storey, with a loft over the bakery. They contain three casement windows, one fixed window, and three doorways, all with cambered heads, and nesting boxes.	II
Stables, Old Rectory; 52.93389°N 2.40997°W	—	Mid 18th century (probable)	The stables are in red brick with rusticated quoins and tile roofs. There are two ranges at right angles, forming an L-shaped plan, both ranges with two levels. The front range has five bays, the middle three bays recessed, and contains a central round-headed doorway with rusticated pilasters and a raised keystone, and multi-paned casement windows. The rear range, which has been partly converted for residential use, has a dentilled eaves cornice, external steps, and vents.	II
The Hills Farmhouse; 52.90099°N 2.45200°W	—	c. 1770	The farmhouse was later altered and extended. It is in red brick, with a dentilled eaves cornice and a tile roof. There are two storeys and an attic, originally with an L-shaped plan, and later two-storey extensions in the angle. The front has three bays, and the windows are casements with cambered heads.	II
Grange Farmhouse; 52.94226°N 2.40801°W	—	Late 18th century	The farmhouse, which was extended in about 1870, is in rendered brick, with a dentilled eaves cornice, and a tile roof. There are three storeys, six bays, a rear extension in brick, and former dairies at right angles. On the front, the middle two bay project slightly under an open pediment that contains a blind lunette. The doorway has reeded pilasters and a pediment. The windows are casements, those in the middle two bays with round heads, and the others with segmental heads.	II
Hales Farmhouse; 52.90285°N 2.42851°W	—	Late 18th century	A red brick farmhouse with a dentilled eaves cornice and a tile roof. There are three storeys, four bays, and a later two-storey rear extension. The doorway has pilasters, a fanlight, and an open pediment, and the windows are casements with segmental heads.	II
Coach house and stables, Hales Farm; 52.90299°N 2.42882°W	—	Late 18th century	The coach house and stables are in red brick with a tile roof. There are two levels and four bays, and the building contains an entry with an elliptical head, a stable door, windows, and vents of perforated brickwork. In the south gable end is a flight of external steps.	II
Stable block, Hales Hall; 52.90042°N 2.42380°W	—	Late 18th century	The stable block was extended in the 19th century. It is in red brick on a plastered sandstone plinth, with a dentilled eaves cornice, and a hipped slate roof. There are two levels, the original part has seven bays, the middle three bays projecting under a pediment, there is a two-bay extension to the left, and a single-storey brick extension to the right. The pediment contains a clock, and above it is a round-arched wooden cupola with a lead cap and a brass weathervane. The building contains stable doors, casement windows with segmental heads, and blind round-headed arches, and on the left gable end is a flight of external steps.	II
Manor House Farmhouse; 52.93602°N 2.36207°W	—	Late 18th century	A red brick farmhouse with a tile roof, two storeys and an attic. The main block has four bays, and at the rear is a two-storey projection and a further extension at right angles. On the front is a porch, and the windows are sashes.	II
Oakley Folly; 52.92413°N 2.42519°W	—	Late 18th century (probable)	The folly is in the form of a church, consisting of a tower and a nave, and is a ruin. It is in red brick and sandstone, with stone dressings and tile roofs. The tower has three stages, corner pilasters, a moulded cornice, and a parapet, and it contains lancet windows. The nave has two levels, round-arched entrances, with raised keystones, and imposts.	II
Stable block and coach house, Oakley Hall; 52.92769°N 2.44618°W	—	Late 18th century (probable)	The stable block and coach house are in red brick with dentilled eaves cornices, stone dressings, and hipped tile roofs. The stable block has three ranges forming a U-shaped plan, the main range with two storeys, and the rear ranges each with one storey. The main range has a front of 13 bays, the middle three bays projecting under a pediment, and containing a carriage entrance with an elliptical arch. Above are three round-headed windows, and on the roof is a wooden cupola with a lead roof and a brass weathervane. The windows are sashes. The coach house is detached on the south and has two levels. In the ground floor is an arcade of four elliptical arches, above are four lunettes, and on the right side is a flight of external steps.	II
Farm buildings, Oakley Park Farm; 52.92727°N 2.44664°W	—	Late 18th century	The farm buildings are arranged in four blocks around a farmyard, and are in brick with stone dressings and tile roofs. The gatehouse range incorporates a dairy and a cowhouse, and contains a carriage arch with an oculus above. The other buildings include a barn and stables, and the openings include doorways, stable doors, a loft door, a cart entrance, windows, ventilation holes, and pitching holes.	II
Pinfold Stud Farmhouse; 52.89420°N 2.41857°W	—	Late 18th century	The farmhouse is in brown brick with a dentilled eaves cornice and a tile roof. There are three storeys, three bays, and two-storey rear extensions. The central doorway has pilasters and a latticed fanlight, and the windows are casements with segmental heads.	II
Stables, The Hills Farm; 52.90130°N 2.45206°W	—	1776	The stables are in red brick, with a floor band and a tile roof. There are two levels, and flanking single-storey projections. The stables contain three openings on the front, a hatch, windows, and a stable door.	II
Bridge over Coal Brook; 52.90125°N 2.44433°W	—	1788	The bridge carries a road over Coal Brook. It is in sandstone, and consists of a single round-headed arch. The bridge has a hood mould and projecting keystones; there is no parapet, but it is ramped down and slightly angled at the ends.	II
Hales Hall; 52.90136°N 2.42526°W	—	c. 1790	A country house that was extensively enlarged in the 19th century, it is stuccoed on a sandstone plinth, and has hipped roofs, partly tiled and partly slated, and two storeys. The south front has seven bays, the outer bays containing three-window bow windows. The middle three bays are flanked by four Doric columns with a pediment, and a moulded eaves parapet. The right return has five bays and contains a canted bay window. The entrance front on the north has six bays, and contains a Doric portico. The windows are sashes, and there is a service wing at the southwest.	II
Unidentified chest tomb 52.93280°N 2.40991°W	—	c. 1790	The chest tomb is in the churchyard of St Mary's Church, Mucklestone, and is in sandstone with a rectangular plan. It has moulded capping, reeded pilasters, and capping blocks. There are three oval panels on the sides and end, the inscriptions being illegible.	II
Latham Memorial; 52.93280°N 2.40995°W	—	1799	The memorial is in the churchyard of St Mary's Church, Mucklestone, and is to the memory of Thomas Latham. It is a chest tomb in sandstone and has a rectangular plan. The tomb has moulded capping, and two round-headed canopies on the top ledger, one with an inscription.	II
White House Farmhouse; 52.92630°N 2.39073°W	—	c. 1800 (probable)	The farmhouse is in brick, rendered except at the rear, with a modillion eaves cornice and a hipped tile roof. There are two storeys, three bays, and a lean-to extension at the rear. On the front is a porch and a doorway with a fanlight, the windows in the main block are sashes with stone cills, and in the extension they are casements. At the rear is a 19th-century cast iron pump.	II
Church of Our Lady and St John and Presbytery, Ashley; 52.92406°N 2.35938°W		1823	The Roman Catholic church and attached presbytery are in stuccoed brick with tiled roofs. The windows are paired with pointed heads under curved triangular hoods. The entrance front has a gabled porch, over which are three windows and an embattled parapet containing two bands of narrow, pointed blank arcading. The presbytery attached to the northwest has two storeys and two bays.	II
Milepost south of bridge No. 61; 52.89815°N 2.46830°W		Early 19th century	The milepost is on the towpath of the Shropshire Union Canal. It is in cast iron, and consists of a circular post with a domed top, and a cambered plate with three panels. On the panels are the distances to Autherley Junction, Nantwich, and Norbury Junction.	II
Milepost southeast of bridge No. 59; 52.88631°N 2.45708°W		Early 19th century	The milepost is on the towpath of the Shropshire Union Canal. It is in cast iron, and consists of a circular post with a domed top, and a cambered plate with three panels. On the panels are the distances to Autherley Junction, Nantwich, and Norbury Junction.	II
Former brewhouse, Oakley Hall; 52.92872°N 2.44616°W	—	Early 19th century (probable)	The former brewhouse is in red brick with stone dressings, on a stone plinth, with a floor band, a blocking course, a moulded cornice, and a hipped tile roof. There are two storeys, in the centre is a round-headed doorway with a fanlight, and the windows are fixed.	II
Old Springs Hall; 52.88765°N 2.44591°W	—	Early 19th century	A small country house, it is in sandstone with a belt course, overhanging bracketed eaves, a hipped slate roof, and two storeys. The north front has five bays, and contains a flat-roofed portico with paired pillars. There are six bays in the west front which contains two bay windows with angle piers, over which are triglyphs and moulded cornices. On the south front is a conservatory, and to the east is an eight-bay service range. All the windows are sashes with moulded sills.	II
Stables, Old Springs Hall; 52.88763°N 2.44519°W	—	Early 19th century	The stable block is in red brick with hipped slate roofs. There is one storey, and projecting corners with two storeys. In the centre is a projecting gabled entrance containing a cambered arch, over which is a wooden cupola with louvres and a lead cap. Some of the windows are fixed, and others are casements.	II
Barn and horse engine house, The Hills Farm; 52.90112°N 2.45270°W	—	Early 19th century	The barn and horse engine house are in red brick, partly on a sandstone plinth, with tile roofs that have coped verges on kneelers. The barn has two ranges with an L-shaped plan, and the horse engine house is in the angle. The barn has two levels, and contains a cart entrance, a wide threshing entrance, vents, windows, external steps, and a loft door. The horse engine house has a half-octagonal plan.	II
Goodall Memorial; 52.93315°N 2.40941°W	—	1826	The memorial is in the churchyard of St Mary's Church, Mucklestone, and is to the memory of John Goodall. It is a chest tomb in sandstone and has a rectangular plan. The tomb has a moulded plinth and capping, and a chamfered top ledger. On the south side is a moulded inscription panel.	II
Tyrley Lock No. 1; 52.88883°N 2.46123°W		1827–30	The lock is on the Shropshire Union Canal. The chamber and wing walls are in brick and stone with concrete coping. The lock has a single top gate in steel, double bottom gates in wood, and concrete heel grip platforms.	II
Tyrley Lock No. 2; 52.88983°N 2.46282°W		1827–30	The lock is on the Shropshire Union Canal. The chamber is in brick and stone, and the wing walls are in brick with brick and concrete coping. The lock has a single top gate in wood, and double bottom gates in steel. At the top is a concrete heel grip platform, and at the bottom the off side platform is in concrete, and the towpath side is in stone and concrete.	II
Tyrley Lock No. 3; 52.89087°N 2.46394°W		1827–30	The lock is on the Shropshire Union Canal. The chamber is in brick and stone, and the wing walls are in brick with concrete coping. The lock has a single top gate and double bottom gates, all in wood. There is a concrete heel grip platform on the off side, and a brick, stone and concrete platform on the towpath side.	II
Tyrley Lock No. 4; 52.89217°N 2.46495°W		1827–30	The lock is on the Shropshire Union Canal. The chamber is in brick and stone, and the wing walls are in brick, both with concrete coping. The lock has a single top gate in wood, and double bottom gates in steel. At the top is a concrete heel grip platform, and at the bottom the platforms are in brick and concrete.	II
Tyrley Lock No. 5; 52.89334°N 2.46568°W		1827–33	The lock is on the Shropshire Union Canal. The chamber and wing walls are in brick and stone with coping in concrete and brick. The lock has a single top gate and double bottom gates, all in wood. At the top is a concrete heel grip platform, and the bottom platform is in brick and concrete.	II
Bridge No. 61; 52.89967°N 2.46846°W		1829	An accommodation bridge over the Shropshire Union Canal, it is in sandstone. The bridge consists of a single elliptical arch with voussoirs and a keystone on the south side, a coped parapet and a string course. On the towpath side are cast iron posts with grooves.	II
Bridge No. 60; 52.88895°N 2.46153°W		c. 1830	The bridge carries a road over the Shropshire Union Canal. It is in sandstone, and consists of a single hump-backed elliptical arch with voussoirs, a coped parapet, and a string course. On the towpath side are cast iron posts with grooves.	II
Bridge No. 59; 52.88683°N 2.45787°W		c. 1830	An accommodation bridge over the Shropshire Union Canal, it is in sandstone, and consists of a single wide elliptical arch. The bridge has voussoirs, a flat string course and a coped parapet. On the towpath side are cast iron posts with grooves.	II
Bridge No. 58; 52.88072°N 2.45677°W		c. 1830	An accommodation bridge over the Shropshire Union Canal, it is in sandstone, the parapet rebuilt in brick. The bridge consists of a narrow single elliptical arch, with voussoirs, imposts and a string course. The revetment walls have circular cast iron tie plates.	II
Berrisford Canal Aqueduct; 52.90519°N 2.46983°W		c. 1830	The aqueduct carries the Shropshire Union Canal over Berrisford Road. It is in sandstone, and consists of a wide round-headed arch with imposts, a string course and voussoirs. There are steep and angled revetment walls on both sides with stone coping.	II
Lock Cottage; 52.88912°N 2.46220°W		c. 1830	The lock-keeper's cottage is in purplish-brown brick and has a slate roof. There is a single storey and five bays, the middle three bays forming semi-octagonal projections at the front and rear, resulting in a cruciform plan. The windows are sashes.	II
Birchall Memorial; 52.93269°N 2.40960°W	—	c. 1830	The memorial is in the churchyard of St Mary's Church, Mucklestone, and is to the memory of members of the Birchall family. It is a chest tomb in sandstone and has a rectangular plan. The tomb has a moulded plinth and capping, fluted corner pilasters, and moulded inscription panels on the north and south sides, and on the top ledger.	II
Harding Memorial; 52.92472°N 2.35405°W	—	c. 1830	The memorial is in the churchyard of St John the Baptist's Church, Ashley, and is to the memory of members of the Harding family. It is a pedestal tomb in sandstone and has a square plan. The tomb has a moulded plinth and capping with rosettes in the corners, and a shallow pyramidal top with a carved urn finial. On the sides are shaped inscription panels.	II
Methodist Church, Knighton; 52.95844°N 2.40329°W	—	1834	A red brick chapel with a dentilled eaves cornice and a tile roof. In the centre is a projecting gabled porch; this is flanked by sash windows with plastered lintels and stone sills, and there is a similar window in the gable end. Above the porch is a datestone.	II
33–36 Tyrley Wharf; 52.88877°N 2.46078°W		1837	A group of former canal workers' cottages on the Shropshire Union Canal, they are in brown brick with stone dressings, and have slate roofs with coped verges on stone kneelers. There are two storeys, and the doorways and windows, which are casements, have stone surrounds. In a gable end is a moulded stone with an inscription and the date.	II
30, 31, 32 and 37 Tyrley Wharf; 52.88894°N 2.46124°W		1840	A group of former canal workers' cottages on the Shropshire Union Canal, with Nos. 30–32 forming a terrace, and No. 37 at right angles to the rear. They are in brown brick with stone dressings, and have slate roofs with coped verges on stone kneelers. There are two storeys, and the doorways and windows, which are casements, have stone surrounds. In a gable end is a moulded stone with an inscription and the date.	II
Former Chapel, Tyrley Wharf; 52.88888°N 2.46113°W		c. 1840	A Non-conformist chapel, later converted into a house, it is in brown brick with stone dressings, and has a slate roof with coped verges on kneelers. There are two levels, and external steps lead up to a doorway with a cambered head in the centre of the upper level. To the left of the doorway is a fixed window, and at the rear is a round-headed doorway with an oculus above.	II
Congregational Chapel and school, Ashley; 52.92720°N 2.35909°W		1841	The chapel and school are in red brick on a sandstone plinth and have tile roofs. The gabled end of the chapel faces the road. It has a dentilled eaves cornice, and contains a central round-headed doorway with a tympanum, imposts, and a plastered keystone. The doorway is flanked by blind windows with plastered stone lintels and sill, above it is a round-headed window, and over that is a datestone. The school is at the rear, and has a single storey, a gabled porch, and a lean-to.	II
Benbow memorial 52.93293°N 2.40937°W	—	Mid 19th century	The memorial is in the churchyard of St Mary's Church, Mucklestone, and is to the memory of members of the Benbow family. It is a chest tomb in sandstone and has a rectangular plan. The tomb has a moulded plinth and capping, a chamfered top ledger, fluted corner pilasters, and moulded inscription panels on the north and south sides.	II
St Mary's Church, Hales; 52.90241°N 2.42735°W		1856	The church, which was designed by George Gilbert Scott in Decorated style, is in pink sandstone with tile roofs. It consists of a nave, a south porch, a chancel, a north organ chamber, and a west tower. The tower has three stages, angle buttresses, a hexagonal stair turret at the southeast, a three-light west window, a moulded cornice, and an embattled parapet with corner gargoyles.	II
Laundry west of Hales Hall; 52.90155°N 2.42570°W	—	Mid to late 19th century (probable)	The laundry is in red brick with a hipped slate roof, splayed to the north. It has a fixed light louvre with an open-sided pyramidal cap.	II
Milepost at NGR SJ 7214 3566; 52.91740°N 2.41601°W		Mid to late 19th century (probable)	The mile post is on the south side of the A53 road. It is in cast iron, and has a triangular section and a chamfered top. On the top is "BLORE", and the sides indicate the distances to Market Drayton, Ashley, Whitmore, Eccleshall, Newcastle-under-Lyme, and Stafford.	II
Milepost at NGR SJ 7258 3738; 52.93329°N 2.40929°W		Mid to late 19th century (probable)	The mile post is on the east side of the B5026 road. It is in cast iron, and has a triangular section and a chamfered top. On the top is "MUCKLESTONE", and on the sides are the distances to Eccleshall, Stafford, Knighton, Pipegate, Woore, and Nantwich.	II
Milepost at NGR SJ 7303 4047; 52.96087°N 2.40297°W		Mid to late 19th century (probable)	The mile post is on the east side of the B5026 road. It is in cast iron, and has a triangular section and a chamfered top. On the top is "KNIGHTON", and on the sides are the distances to Eccleshall, Stafford, Woore, and Nantwich.	II
Milepost at NGR SJ 7322 3644; 52.92467°N 2.40031°W		Mid to late 19th century (probable)	The mile post is on the north side of the B5026 road. It is in cast iron, and has a triangular section and a chamfered top. On the top is "MUCKLESTONE", and on the sides are the distances to Eccleshall, Stafford, Knighton, Pipegate, Woore, and Nantwich.	II
Milepost at NGR SJ 7370 3586; 52.91953°N 2.39314°W		Mid to late 19th century (probable)	The mile post is on the south side of the A53 road. It is in cast iron, and has a triangular section and a chamfered top. On the top is "BLORE", and the sides indicate the distances to Market Drayton, Ashley, Whitmore, Eccleshall, Newcastle-under-Lyme, and Stafford.	II
Milepost at NGR SJ 7438 3538; 52.91525°N 2.38250°W		Mid to late 19th century (probable)	The mile post is on the northeast side of the B5026 road. It is in cast iron, and has a triangular section and a chamfered top. On the top is "ASHLEY", and on the sides are the distances to Eccleshall, Stafford, Knighton, Pipegate, Market Drayton, Woore, and Nantwich.	II
Sewer ventilation pipe 52.92515°N 2.38034°W	—	Late 19th century	The sewer ventilation pipe is in cast iron, and is about 4 metres (13 ft) tall. It has a tapered and fluted base and a plain shaft. Part way up the shaft is a horizontal band with embossed ball mouldings, and at the top is a collar with similar mouldings.	II
Dutch barn, Home Farm; 52.90011°N 2.45917°W	—	1883	The dutch barn is in red brick with a tile roof, and is open on the west side. There are seven bays, and a loft over the four southern bays. There are double doors, brick air vents on the back and sides, and on the roof are five rows of ventilators.	II
The Clock House; 52.89928°N 2.46188°W	—	1891	The former stable block of a country house, now demolished, has been converted for residential use, it is in red brick with stone dressings, a floor band, pilaster strips, a modillion eaves cornice, and a tile roof. There are two storeys and an attic, and seven bays. The central bay has an open pediment containing two oculi and a clock, and behind it is a cupola with corner pilasters and a lead dome with a brass weathervane. Most of the windows are casements with aprons and projecting keystones.	II
