= Listed buildings in Maer, Staffordshire =

Maer is a civil parish in the district of Newcastle-under-Lyme, Staffordshire, England. It contains 27 buildings that are recorded in the National Heritage List for England. Of these, three are listed at Grade II*, the middle of the three grades, and the others are at Grade II, the lowest grade. The parish contains the villages of Maer and Aston, and the surrounding countryside. Most of the listed buildings are houses, cottages, farmhouses and farm buildings. In the parish is a country house, Maer Hall, and another large house, Lea Head Manor, both of which are listed, together with associated structures. The other listed buildings are a church, memorials in the churchyard, and five mileposts.

== Key ==
Grade	Criteria
II*	Particularly important buildings of more than special interest
II	Buildings of national importance and special interest

== Buildings ==
Name and location	Photograph	Date	Notes	Grade
St Peter's Church; 52.94199°N 2.30992°W		Late 12th to early 13th century	The church was extended in the 14th century, substantially rebuilt in the 17th century, and restored in about 1870. It is built in sandstone, and has tile roofs with ornamental cresting. The church consists of a nave and a chancel in one unit, a north aisle, a south porch, a north organ chamber and vestry, and a west tower. The tower has two stages, a west door, and an embattled parapet with corner pinnacles.	II*
The Vicarage; 52.94130°N 2.31009°W	—	Late 16th century	The vicarage, later a private house, was altered and extended in the 19th century. The original part is in sandstone on a chamfered plinth with repairs in purplish-brown brick, the extensions are in red brick, and the roof is tiled. The original part has a gabled porch and mullioned and transomed windows. The extension has three bays, one gabled, and there are two rear wings.	II
181 Aston; 52.96669°N 2.36309°W	—	c. 1600	A farmhouse, later a private house, it is timber framed with painted brick infill, on a sandstone plinth, with a tile roof. There are two storeys and an attic, and three bays. The doorway has a gabled hood, and the windows are casements. Inside, there is an inglenook fireplace and exposed timber framing.	II
Yew Tree Farmhouse; 52.96519°N 2.36675°W	—	Late 16th to early 17th century	A farmhouse, later a private house, it has been altered and extended. The original part is timber framed with painted brick infill on a sandstone plinth. The left gable end is clad in brick, and the right gable end has applied timber. The extension is in painted brick, with one storey and an attic, and the roofs are tiled. There are two storeys and an attic, the original range has three bays, and the extension forms a rear wing. The windows are casements, and in the extension are three gabled dormers.	II
Cowhouse, 181 Aston; 52.96667°N 2.36297°W	—	17th century	The cowhouse, which projects at right angles from the house, was remodelled in the 19th century. It is timber framed and has been largely rebuilt in sandstone, with patching in brick and a tile roof. There are two levels and three bays. On the east front are two entrances, two windows, and two eaves hatches.	II
Aston Cliff Farmhouse; 52.97574°N 2.35818°W	—	17th century	The farmhouse has a timber framed core, it is clad in red and blue brick, with and has a dentilled eaves cornice and a tile roof. There are two storeys and an attic, and an L-shaped plan, consisting of a two-bay hall range, and a gabled cross-wing. On the front is a gabled porch, and the windows are casements. Inside, there is an inglenook fireplace.	II
Maer Hall and wall 52.94205°N 2.31080°W		Mid 17th century	A country house that has been enlarged, and then reduced. It is in sandstone on a chamfered plinth and has stone slate roofs. The house is in two and three storeys with cellars. The west front has five bays, mullioned and transomed windows, a central two-storey porch with a round-headed opening, and columns that are Doric below and Ionic above, a moulded eaves cornice, and three dormers with shaped gables connected by an open balustrade. The north front has three bays, a single-storey porch, and dormers with shaped gables. To the south is a coped stone garden wall.	II
201 Aston; 52.96801°N 2.36807°W	—	Late 17th century (probable)	A timber framed cottage with painted brick infill, partly clad, and with a tile roof. There are two storeys, a front range of two bays, and a later single-storey rear extension. On the front is a doorway with a gabled hood, and the windows are casements. Inside, the timber framing is mainly intact.	II
Lea Head Manor; 52.97502°N 2.37285°W	—	Late 17th century	The house is timber framed with painted brick infill on a chamfered sandstone plinth, with a tile roof, and gables with decorated bargeboards and pointed finials. There are two storeys, an attic and cellars, and an L-shaped plan, with a four-bay main range and a rear wing. The upper storey of the main range is jettied on carved brackets. The windows are casements, and there are three gabled dormers. The doorway is in the centre, and to its left is a massive sandstone chimney that has four round stacks with moulded capping.	II*
Gate piers, Lea Head Manor; 52.97453°N 2.37407°W	—	Late 17th to early 18th century	The gate piers, which have been relocated, are in rusticated sandstone and have a square plan. Each pier has moulded capping, and a half dome surmounted by a pineapple finial.	II
Harding memorial (southwest); 52.94189°N 2.31018°W	—	18th century	The memorial is in the churchyard of St Peter's Church, and is to the memory of John Harding and his wife. It is a chest tomb in sandstone, and has a rectangular plan. The tomb has a moulded plinth and capping, and panelled corner pilasters. There is a moulded inscription panel on the north side.	II
Aston Manor Farmhouse; 52.96694°N 2.36887°W		Late 18th century	The farmhouse is in red brick with a moulded eaves cornice and a tile roof. There are three storeys and a U-shaped plan, consisting of a three-bay front range, parallel rear wings, and a single-storey lean-to at the rear. The entrance front contains a central doorway with a rectangular fanlight and a pediment, and is flanked by French windows. In the upper floors are sash windows with raised plastered keystones.	II
Gatehouse, walls and bollards, Maer Hall; 52.94174°N 2.31034°W		Late 18th century	The gatehouse is in sandstone with a stone slate roof. It has a square plan with a round-headed arch on each front, projecting corner pilasters, and a moulded cornice. Above is a clock house, with clock faces on the east and west fronts, an open pediment, and globe finials. Flanking the gateway are stone walls, each containing a round-headed doorway, and ending in a square pilaster with chamfered capping and a globe finial. In front of the gateway are two cast iron fluted bollards.	II*
Sundial; 52.94186°N 2.30981°W	—	Late 18th or early 19th century (probable)	The sundial is in the churchyard of St Peter's Church, and is in sandstone. It has a square section with a wider cap, and stands on an octagonal plinth.	II
Aston memorial 52.94190°N 2.30993°W	—	Early 19th century	The memorial is in the churchyard of St Peter's Church, and is to the memory of members of the Aston family. It is a chest tomb in sandstone, and has a rectangular plan. The tomb has a moulded plinth and capping, and square corner balusters. On the top is an inscribed ledger with round corners, and on the sides are inscribed panels.	II
Bridge, steps and walls, Maer Hall; 52.94344°N 2.31151°W	—	Mid 19th century	The structures are in sandstone. The bridge carries a footpath over a road, and consists of a single segmental arch with an open parapet, and revetment walls on both sides. On the west side is a flight of five steps with low coped sides, and piers with octagonal urn finials.	II
Harding memorial (southeast); 52.94194°N 2.30958°W	—	Mid 19th century	The memorial is in the churchyard of St Peter's Church, on a sandstone-faced terrace, and is to the memory of George Harding and his wife. It is a chest tomb in sandstone, and has a rectangular plan. The tomb has a moulded plinth and capping, and panelled corner pilasters. There are moulded inscription panels on the north and south sides.	II
Maer Hall Lodge, walls, gate piers and gates 52.94623°N 2.31501°W		c. 1860	The lodge is in sandstone with a stone slate roof, and is in Jacobean style. There is a single storey, a rectangular block, and an extension to the east. The porch has a pointed doorway and a moulded and embattled parapet. The gables are shaped, with globe finials and coats of arms, and there is a canted bay window. The carriageway is flanked by gate piers, piers also flank the pedestrian entrance, and there are piers at the ends of the quadrant walls. The ornamental gates are in cast iron.	II
Balustrade, Maer Hall; 52.94176°N 2.31143°W	—	Mid to late 19th century (probable)	The balustrade is to the west of the hall, it is in sandstone, and is about 200 metres (660 ft) long. The balustrade is low, with round-arched openwork, moulded coping, and ball finials. It contains five short flight of steps.	II
Boathouse and causeway, Maer Hall; 52.94218°N 2.31242°W	—	Mid to late 19th century (probable)	The boathouse is in sandstone with a flat roof and parapet, and contains round-headed arches. There is access from the roof to the causeway, which is about 20 metres (66 ft) long.	II
Outbuildings, outer stable yard, Maer Hall; 52.94110°N 2.31103°W	—	Mid to late 19th century (probable)	The outbuildings consist of a stable and coach house, a dovecote, and another building of uncertain purpose. They are in orange-red brick with sandstone dressings and a tile roof. The stable and coach house have two storeys, round-headed openings in both storeys, and casement windows. The dovecote has a square plan and a pyramidal roof, and contains three rows of nesting boxes. The other building has top-lit pavilions.	II
Stable block, Maer Hall; 52.94150°N 2.31072°W	—	Mid to late 19th century (probable)	The stable block and coachman's house, later used for other purposes, are in orange-red brick with slate roofs that are hipped to the east and have a ball finial. There are two levels, and a main range with projections. There are various openings, including stable doors, casement windows, and a pitching hole, and also recessed blind round-headed arches.	II
Milepost at NGR SJ 7527 3984; 52.95533°N 2.36958°W		Mid to late 19th century (probable)	The milepost is on the south side of the A51 road. It is in cast iron, and has a triangular plan and a chamfered top On the top is "MAER" and on the sides are the distances to Pipegate, Woore, Nantwich, and Stone.	II
Milepost at NGR SJ 7665 3897; 52.94745°N 2.34894°W		Mid to late 19th century (probable)	The milepost is on the south side of the A51 road. It is in cast iron, and has a triangular plan and a chamfered top. On the top is "MAER" and on the sides are the distances to Pipegate, Woore, Nantwich, and Stone.	II
Milepost at NGR SJ 7724 3878; 52.94603°N 2.34023°W		Mid to late 19th century (probable)	The milepost is on the south side of the A51 road. It is in cast iron, and has a triangular plan and a chamfered top. On the top is "MAER" and on the sides are the distances to Ashley, Market Drayton, Whitmore, and Newcastle-under-Lyme.	II
Milepost at NGR SJ 7823 3884; 52.94640°N 2.32530°W		Mid to late 19th century (probable)	The milepost is on the south side of the A51 road. It is in cast iron, and has a triangular plan and a chamfered top. On the top is "MAER" and on the sides are the distances to Pipegate, Woore, Nantwich, and Stone.	II
Milepost at NGR SJ 7853 3968; 52.95403°N 2.32113°W		Mid to late 19th century (probable)	The milepost is on the southeast side of the A53 road. It is in cast iron, and has a triangular plan and a chamfered top. On the top is "MAER" and on the sides are the distances to Ashley, Market Drayton, Whitmore, and Newcastle-under-Lyme.	II
