= Blore Heath Rural District =

Former local government area in the UK

Coordinates: 52°54′31″N 2°25′11″W

Blore Heath was a rural district in Staffordshire, England from 1894 to 1932.

It was created under the Local Government Act 1894 from that part of the Market Drayton rural sanitary district which was in Staffordshire (the Shropshire part becoming Drayton Rural District). It covered the parishes of Ashley, Mucklestone and Tyrley.

It was abolished by a County Review Order in 1932, and was added to the Newcastle-under-Lyme Rural District.
