= Almington =

Village in Staffordshire, England

Coordinates: 52.90°N 02.44°W

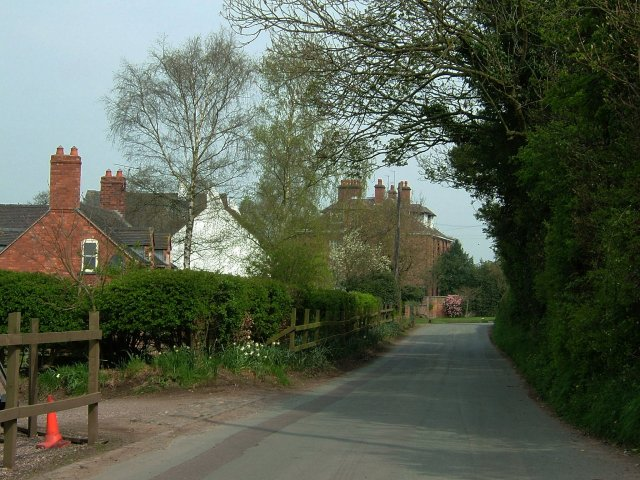
- Almington Village

- Location within Staffordshire
- OS grid reference: SJ7034
- Civil parish: Loggerheads
- Shire county: Staffordshire
- Region: West Midlands
- Country: England
- Sovereign state: United Kingdom
- Post town: Market Drayton
- Postcode district: TF9
- Dialling code: 01630
- Police: Staffordshire
- Fire: Staffordshire
- Ambulance: West Midlands
- UK Parliament: Stafford

Almington is a small village in Staffordshire, England. It is about 2 miles (3.2 km) east-northeast of Market Drayton by road, to the northwest of the villages of Hales and west of Blore Heath. Historically the manor and Almington Hall belonged to the Pandulf family, and much later, the Broughton family.

== History ==
Almington, also referred to as "Almentone", was mentioned in the Domesday Book of 1086, when it belonged to the Pantulf family. It is described as containing "3 hides "with appendages,” land for 6 ploughs, two acres of meadow and a wood two leagues long and one league wide (six miles by three miles)". The manor of Almington was larger than William Pandulf's Creswell, Derrington and Moddershall manors.

Almington historically belonged to the Staffordshire part of the parish of Market Drayton, once known as "Drayton in Hales", in the Hundred of Pirehill, along with the hamlets of Blore Heath, Hales and Tyrley.

In 1811, Samuel Lewis stated that the township of Almington had a population of 340 people. In 1834, Peter Stray Broughton was stated to be the owner and lord of the manor of Almington, but Lieutenant-Colonel Dawes occupied Almington Hall. It remained in the Broughton family, and in 1913 it belonged to John Lambert Broughton who resided at Almington Hall.

== Geography ==
Almington is about 2 miles (3.2 km) east-northeast of Market Drayton by road, and west of the village of Loggerheads. It lies to the northwest of the villages of Hales and west of Blore Heath. Pinfold Lane leads out of the village and connects Almington to the A53 road (Newcastle Road). The River Tern flows to the west of the village.

Geological studies of the area have revealed that Almington has coarse sandstones, red or pinkish brown in colour, with few or no pebbles in places, though there is a gravel pit in the vicinity with many.
