= Berth Hill =

Hillfort in Staffordshire, England

- Location within Staffordshire
- 52°56′53″N 2°19′3″W
- Type: Hillfort
- Periods: Iron Age
- Location: Near Newcastle-under-Lyme, Staffordshire
- OS grid reference: SJ 788 390

Site notes
- Length: 320 metres (1,050 ft)
- Width: 150 metres (490 ft)
- Area: 3.75 hectares (9.3 acres)

Scheduled monument
- Designated: 30 November 1925
- Reference no.: 1009771

Berth Hill is an Iron Age hillfort in Staffordshire, England, about 5 miles (8.0 km) south-west of Newcastle-under-Lyme, and near the village of Maer. It is a scheduled monument. Other forms of its name have been Bryth, Bruff and Burgh Hill.

== Description ==
The fort is on a sandstone outcrop at the south-east edge of Maer Hills. The defences, following the contours of the hill, have an irregular shape. Their length is 320 metres (1,050 ft) north-west to south-east, and the width is 150 metres (490 ft), enclosing an area of about 3.75 hectares (9.3 acres).

The rampart, of earth and stone, is up to 15 metres (49 ft) wide and 0.8 metres (2.6 ft) above the interior. In the north, the slope is less steep than elsewhere, and there is a second rampart outside this, width 10 metres (33 ft). There are two original entrances: an inturned entrance in the south-west, and an entrance at the north end of the east defences. There is a spring on the eastern side of the interior.

=== Excavations ===
Results of excavations in 1966 and 1975 have been interpreted as showing an early period of occupation, followed by a long interval of disuse (suggested by ditches containing silt and parts of collapsed rampart), and later a hurried reconstruction of the defences.

=== Nineteenth-century changes ===
Josiah Wedgwood II, owner of Maer Hall in the early 19th century, built an aqueduct to pipe water from the spring to the Hall and the village of Maer. This, with associated damage to the inner rampart, remains visible on the east side of the hill.

Part of the site, mainly in the north and east, was adapted in the 19th century to be an ornamental landscape: there are garden walks, and a zig-zag path leading to a small platform, thought to be a viewing area.

== See also ==
- Hillforts in Britain
