= Listed buildings in Whitmore, Staffordshire =

Whitmore is a civil parish in the district of Newcastle-under-Lyme, Staffordshire, England. It contains 28 listed buildings that are recorded in the National Heritage List for England. Of these, one is listed at Grade I, the highest of the three grades, four are at Grade II*, the middle grade, and the others are at Grade II, the lowest grade. The parish contains the village of Whitmore and the surrounding area. Most of the listed buildings are houses, cottages, farmhouses, and farm buildings. The other listed buildings include two churches, memorials in a churchyard, a country house with associated structures, the ruins of a former manor house, and five mileposts.

== Key ==
Grade	Criteria
I	Buildings of exceptional interest, sometimes considered to be internationally important
II*	Particularly important buildings of more than special interest
II	Buildings of national importance and special interest

== Buildings ==
Name and location	Photograph	Date	Notes	Grade
Church of St Mary and All Saints, Whitmore; 52.96632°N 2.28372°W		12th century	The church was remodelled in the 17th century and restored in about 1880. It is built in sandstone, the belfry and west gable end are timber framed, the roof of the body of the church is tiled, and the belfry and porch roofs are slated. The church consists of a nave and a chancel in one unit, a south vestry, a north organ chamber, a gabled belfry at the west end, and a west porch. The belfry has a clock in the west face, and a pyramidal roof with a brass weathervane. Parts of the north and south walls are Norman, and contain 17th-century mullioned windows. At the west end, above the porch, is a flat-headed window with five arched lights, and the east window has five lights in Decorated style.	II*
Whitmore Hall; 52.96843°N 2.28296°W		16th century	A country house that was remodelled in 1676, and later altered and extended.. It has a timber framed core, and is encased in red brick, on a stone plinth, with stone dressings, quoins and a hipped tile roof. There are two storeys and cellars, a front of nine bays, sides of five bays, and later rear extensions. The south front has a string course, a moulded eaves cornice, and an open balustrade. The central porch has a broken scrolled and inscribed pedimented gable, and inside is a frieze depicting naval trophies. The windows are sashes, most with keystones, and some with moulded surrounds, and carved heads replacing keystones.	I
Old stable block, Whitmore Hall; 52.96841°N 2.28384°W	—	c. 1620–30 (probable)	The former stable block is in sandstone on a chamfered plinth, with a string course and a tile roof. There are two storeys, the upper for grooms' accommodation, and a symmetrical front of three bays. On the roof is a wooden hexagonal cupola, with clock faces on the north and south sides, and a lead dome. In the ground floor is a central doorway with massive Tudor arched lintel, and the windows are mullioned. The interior is well preserved, with accommodation for nine horses, including round-headed arches with globular pendants, and similar arches on the back wall.	II*
Ruins of Old Butterton Hall; 52.97978°N 2.24738°W	—	Late 16th century (probable)	A former manor house, now a ruin, it is in sandstone, and consists of parts of two walls. There are two projecting chimney stacks with mutilated fireplaces, a disfigured arch, and part of an internal cross-wall.	II
Lake House; 52.97155°N 2.30190°W	—	17th century	A farmhouse, later a private house, it has been much altered and extended. The original part is timber framed on a sandstone plinth, the infill and extensions are in painted brick with applied timber framing, and the roof is tiled. There are two storeys, the original part is a hall range with a gabled jettied projecting cross-wing on the right, there is an extension to the right of the cross-wing, and a rear wing. The windows are casements.	II
Barn, Shutlanehead Farm; 52.97930°N 2.26986°W	—	17th century	The barn, which is attached to the farmhouse and later used as stables, was partly rebuilt in the 19th century. It is timber framed with purplish-brown brick infill, the gable ends are in vitrified brick, and the roof is tiled. There are two levels with a hayloft, and the barn contains stable doors, three rows of vents, and two eaves hatches.	II
Snape Hall Farmhouse; 52.96809°N 2.30980°W	—	Mid 17th century	The farmhouse was later extended. The original part is in sandstone on a chamfered plinth, with patching in red brick, the later parts are in red brick, partly roughcast, and the roof is tiled. There are two storeys and an attic, a front range of three bays, and a lower two-storey rear range. The central doorway has a fanlight, the windows in the front range are mullioned and transomed, and in the rear range they are casements.	II
Gate piers, Whitmore Hall; 52.96587°N 2.28340°W	—	Late 17th or early 18th century (probable)	The gate piers, which are not in situ, are in rusticated sandstone. They have a square section, and each has a moulded plinth and capping, and a pineapple finial.	II
Bridge south-east of Old Stable block 52.96823°N 2.28385°W	—	Mid to late 18th century	The bridge is in sandstone with patching in brick. It consists of a single round arch with a hood mould, and has a curved parapet with curved ends.	II
Rhodes memorial 52.96623°N 2.28380°W	—	Late 18th century (probable)	The memorial is in the churchyard of the Church of St Mary and All Saints. It is a chest tomb in sandstone, and has an oblong plan. The tomb has a moulded plinth and capping, the corners are rounded with multi-fluted pilasters, moulded inscription panels with fluted spandrels on the corners, and an inscription on the top ledger. The inscriptions are illegible.	II
Park Lodge; 52.98229°N 2.25239°W	—	c. 1810–20	An estate lodge in sandstone, with a moulded eaves cornice and a hipped slate roof. There is a single storey and a T-shaped plan, consisting of a front range and a polygonal rear range. On the front is a pedimented portico with a round arch, and the windows are casements with pointed heads.	II
Butterton Grange Farmhouse; 52.97615°N 2.23517°W		1816–17	The house, designed by Sir John Soane, is in reddish-brown brick with stone dressings, a sill band, wide eaves, and a hipped slate roof. There are two storeys and three bays. The central bay is recessed and flanked by giant canted pilasters facing each other, and there are also canted angle pilasters on the corners. The central doorway is round-headed with a fanlight, and the widows are sashes, those in the ground floor with round heads and fanlights. The chimney stacks on the ridge form a blind arcade of five round-headed arches, the central arch pierced.	II*
Malkin memorial 52.96649°N 2.28403°W	—	Early 19th century	The memorial is in the churchyard of the Church of St Mary and All Saints, and is to the memory of members of the Malkin family. It is a chest tomb in sandstone, and has a rectangular plan. The tomb has a plain, slightly chamfered projecting top ledger, and fluted corner pilasters.	II
Gate piers, Park Lodge; 52.98220°N 2.25236°W	—	Early 19th century	The gate piers that flank the entrance to the drive are in sandstone. They are monolithic, with a circular section, moulded capping and rounded, slightly pointed finials.	II
Station House; 52.95999°N 2.30563°W	—	Early 19th century	The house is rendered with plastered stone dressings, a sill band, corner pilasters, and a hipped slate roof. There are two storeys and three bays, the middle bay slightly recessed. The central doorway is in a plastered and moulded segmental arch, and has side lights. The windows are sashes in architraves.	II
Williams memorial 52.96617°N 2.28427°W	—	c. 1835	The memorial is in the churchyard of the Church of St Mary and All Saints, and is to the memory of members of the Williams family. It is a chest tomb in sandstone, and has a rectangular plan. The tomb has a moulded plinth and capping, panelled corner pilasters, and moulded inscription panels.	II
Ivy Cottage; 52.98632°N 2.25987°W	—	c. 1840 (probable)	An estate cottage in reddish-brown brick with blue brick diapering on a stone coped plinth, with a tile roof that has coped verges and shaped finials. There is one storey and an attic, and a cruciform plan, with a central projecting gable, and a later flat-roofed rear extension. The windows are in cast iron and mullioned, and there are two gabled dormers. On the roof are two tall chimney stacks with diagonal shafts and dentilled capping.	II
Park House; 52.97999°N 2.24861°W	—	c. 1840	Originally a stable block, later a house with stables, it is partly in sandstone with moulded eaves, and partly in red brick with a dentilled eaves cornice, and has hipped slate roofs. There are two storeys, and a square plan with a central courtyard. The south range has five bays, the central bay projecting with a pediment and an elliptical stable arch, and flanking blind elliptical arches. On the east range is a portico with two pairs of Tuscan columns and a pediment, and the windows are sashes.	II
St Thomas' Church, Butterton; 52.97729°N 2.25181°W		1844	The church, designed by Thomas Hopper in Norman style, is built in sandstone with tile roofs. It has a cruciform plan, consisting of a nave, north and south transepts, a short chancel with a southeast vestry, and a tower at the crossing. The tower has an octagonal stair turret, a moulded parapet, and a squat octagonal spire with one tier of gabled lucarnes. Around the church is a Lombard frieze, and the windows are round-headed.	II*
Whitmore Hall Lodge; 52.96595°N 2.28330°W	—	c. 1850	The lodge, which was later altered and extended, is in red brick with stone quoins, and tile roofs with finials. It is in two parts, the west part has a single storey, the east part, which is recessed, has two storeys, and there is a further rear two-storey projection. On the front is a gabled timber porch, and the windows are casements. On the gable ends are bay windows with patterned cast iron windows and coats of arms.	II
Fitch memorial 52.96644°N 2.28392°W	—	Mid 19th century	The memorial is in the churchyard of the Church of St Mary and All Saints, and is to the memory Susanna Fitch. It is a chest tomb in sandstone, and has a rectangular plan. The tomb has a slightly projecting moulded top ledger, and fluted corner pilasters. On the sides are moulded inscription panels that are illegible.	II
Milepost at NGR; SJ 7980 4054; 52.96188°N 2.30209°W		Mid to late 19th century	The milepost is on the southeast side of the A53 road. It is in cast iron with a triangular plan and a chamfered top. On the top is "WHITMORE", and on the sides are the distances to Ashley, Market Drayton, Whitmore, and Newcastle-under-Lyme.	II
Milepost at NGR; SJ 8132 4112; 52.96745°N 2.27934°W		Mid to late 19th century	The milepost is on the southeast side of the A53 road. It is in cast iron with a triangular plan and a chamfered top. On the top is "WHITMORE", and on the sides are the distances Ashley, Market Drayton, and Newcastle-under-Lyme.	II
Milepost at NGR; SJ 8242 4217; 52.97748°N 2.26339°W		Mid to late 19th century	The milepost is on the east side of the A53 road. It is in cast iron with a triangular plan and a chamfered top. On the top is "ACTON", and on the sides are the distances to Whitmore, Ashley, Market Drayton, and Newcastle-under-Lyme.	II
Milepost at NGR; SJ 8257 4183; 52.97347°N 2.26126°W		Mid to late 19th century	The milepost is on the south side of the A5182 road. It is in cast iron with a triangular plan and a chamfered top. On the top is "ACTON", and on the sides are the distances to Whitmore, Market Drayton, Trentham, Longton, Stone, and Stafford.	II
Milepost at NGR; SJ 8400 4186; 52.97382°N 2.23967°W		Mid to late 19th century	The milepost is on the south side of the A5182 road. It is in cast iron with a triangular plan and a chamfered top. On the top is "HANCHURCH", and on the sides are the distances to Whitmore, Market Drayton, Trentham, Longton, Stone, and Stafford.	II
House west-north-west of the Church of St Mary and All Saints; 52.96667°N 2.28567°W	—	c. 1875	Estate cottages, later converted into a private house, it is in painted brick with a tile roof. There are two storeys, a front of five bays, and two bays on the sides. In the centre is a gabled timber porch, and the windows are casements, those in the upper floor with gables that have scrolled fretwork and pointed finials.	II
Cottages dated 1877; 52.96622°N 2.28507°W	—	1877	A row of estate cottages in painted brick with a tile roof. There are two storeys, and four bays. In the centre is a gabled timber porch, and the windows are casements, those in the upper floor with gables that have scrolled fretwork and pointed finials.	II
