= Tyrley =

Former civil parish in Staffordshire, England

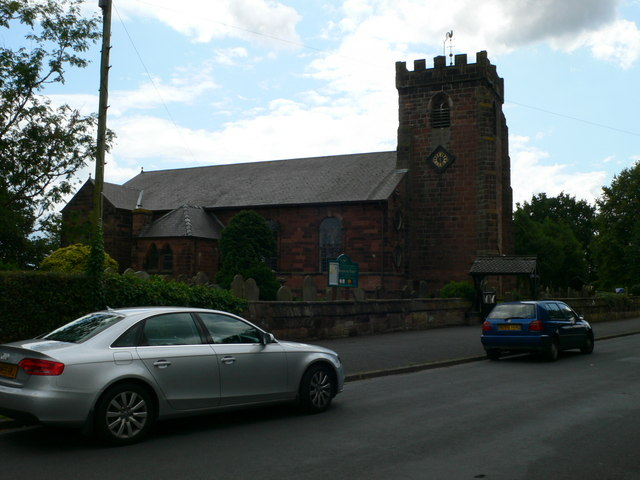
- Hales

- Location within Staffordshire
- Civil parish: Loggerheads
- District: Newcastle-under-Lyme
- Shire county: Staffordshire
- Region: West Midlands
- Country: England
- Sovereign state: United Kingdom
- Post town: MARKET DRAYTON
- Postcode district: TF9
- Dialling code: 01630
- Police: Staffordshire
- Fire: Staffordshire
- Ambulance: West Midlands

Tyrley was a small settlement in Staffordshire, England (now in Shropshire), now lost, and a former civil parish. It was located immediately south of Market Drayton. The name means "clearing by the River Tern" It was mentioned in the Domesday Book of 1086, when it belonged to William Pandolf, and was the site of a castle later (52°54′00″N 2°28′45″W). Tyrley (Tirley) Castle was located alongside the present day A529. "The castle built after the conquest by the Pantulfs" is believed to date back to 1066 and later rebuilt in stone in the thirteenth-century. The castle was succeeded by a newly built Manor house in the 1280s which fell into disrepair, with an eighteenth-century farmhouse built upon the site which remains to this day.

In the Domesday Book Tyrley was listed under Shropshire. It was transferred to Staffordshire probably between 1099 and 1135. Tyrley was historically in the Staffordshire part of the ancient parish of Drayton in Hales, which also included the villages of Almington and Hales. The Staffordshire part of Drayton in Hales became the separate civil parish of Tyrley in 1866. The parish formed part of Blore Heath Rural District from 1894 to 1932, when it was added to Newcastle-under-Lyme Rural District. In 1965 the part of the parish west of the Shropshire Union Canal (including the site of the lost settlement and Tyrley Castle) was transferred to the parish of Sutton upon Tern in Shropshire.

In 1974 it became part of Newcastle-under-Lyme non-metropolitan district. In 1971 the parish had a population of 753. On 1 April 1984 the civil parish was abolished and its area was transferred to the new parish of Loggerheads.

The name survives in the Tyrley Canal Cutting, Tyrley Wharf and Tyrley Locks on the Shropshire Union Canal. Tyrley Wharf served as a small dock above a flight of five locks. In 1911 it was used to load milk churns to be taken from the Peatswood Estate to Cadbury's factory at Knighton.
