= Tyrley Canal Cutting =

Place in Shropshire, England

Coordinates: 52.876227°N 2.454672°W

Tyrley Canal Cutting (also known as Woodseaves Cutting) is a Site of Special Scientific Interest located at Tyrley on the Shropshire Union Canal approximately 2.5 miles south of Market Drayton, to the east of the A529 in Shropshire, England.

The site is SSSI designated as it is the best available site in the area for the Keele Formation, which is probably Late Carboniferous in age. The site shows a major river-channel sandstone, together with overbank or crevasse-splay sandstones, associated with flood plain deposits. It is the best site for showing details of channel form and for interpreting their mode of formation. The site is of considerable importance for helping to interpret the Late Carboniferous and Early Permian geological history of Britain, and for demonstrating characteristics of river sediments of that era.
