= Whitmore Hall =

Grade I listed historic house museum in the United Kingdom

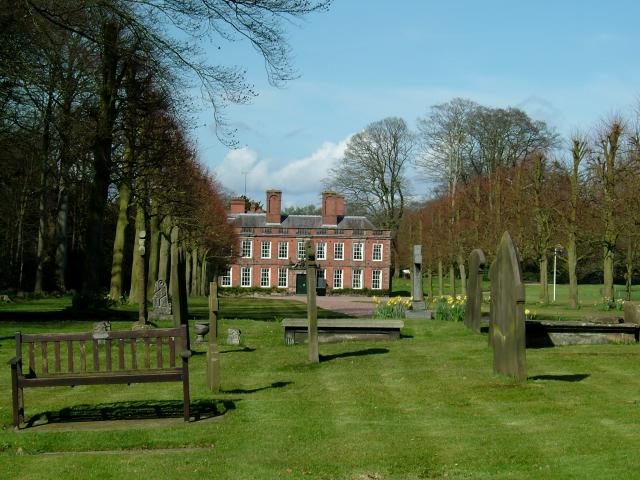

- Location within Staffordshire

General information
- Architectural style: Carolean
- Location: Whitmore, Staffordshire, England
- Coordinates: 52°58′06″N 02°16′58″W
- Owner: Private ownership, Cavenagh-Mainwaring family, formerly leased to Thomas Twyford

Whitmore Hall is the home of the Cavenagh-Mainwaring family at Whitmore, Staffordshire. A Grade I listed building, the hall was designated a house of outstanding architectural and historical interest and is a fine example of a small Carolean style manor house.

== History ==
By the time of the Norman Conquest, the manor of Whitmore was held by one Richard the Forester. Whitmore appears in the Domesday Book and is valued at 10 shillings. By 1204 it was owned by William Boterel, who was described as "Dominus de Whitmore juxta Nova Castrum sub Lina" (Lord of Whitmore near Newcastle-under-Lyme). The estate passed to the Mainwaring family in 1519, through the descendants of a Boterel heiress, Alice Boghay. Their descendants have owned the estate ever since. The Mainwarings of Whitmore are descended from the Mainwarings of Over-Peover, Cheshire (see the twentieth century Mainwaring Baronets). Five Edward Mainwarings served as High Sheriff of Staffordshire between 1645 and 1767.

=== Today ===
The house was leased out from about 1863 until the Cavenagh-Mainwaring family returned to occupation in the 1920s. One of the tenants, pottery manufacturer Thomas Twyford, occupied the hall for 30 years. The hall is a private residence. It is open to the public on two days per week between May and August.

== Architecture ==
The original hall was encased in red brick during the reign of Charles II and completed in about 1676. It has a balustraded frontage with nine bays and two storeys. There is a particularly well preserved Elizabethan stable block.

== See also ==
- List of Grade I listed buildings in Staffordshire
- Listed buildings in Whitmore, Staffordshire
