= Blore, Newcastle-under-Lyme =

Hamlet in Staffordshire, England

Coordinates: 52.908°N 2.416°W

Blore
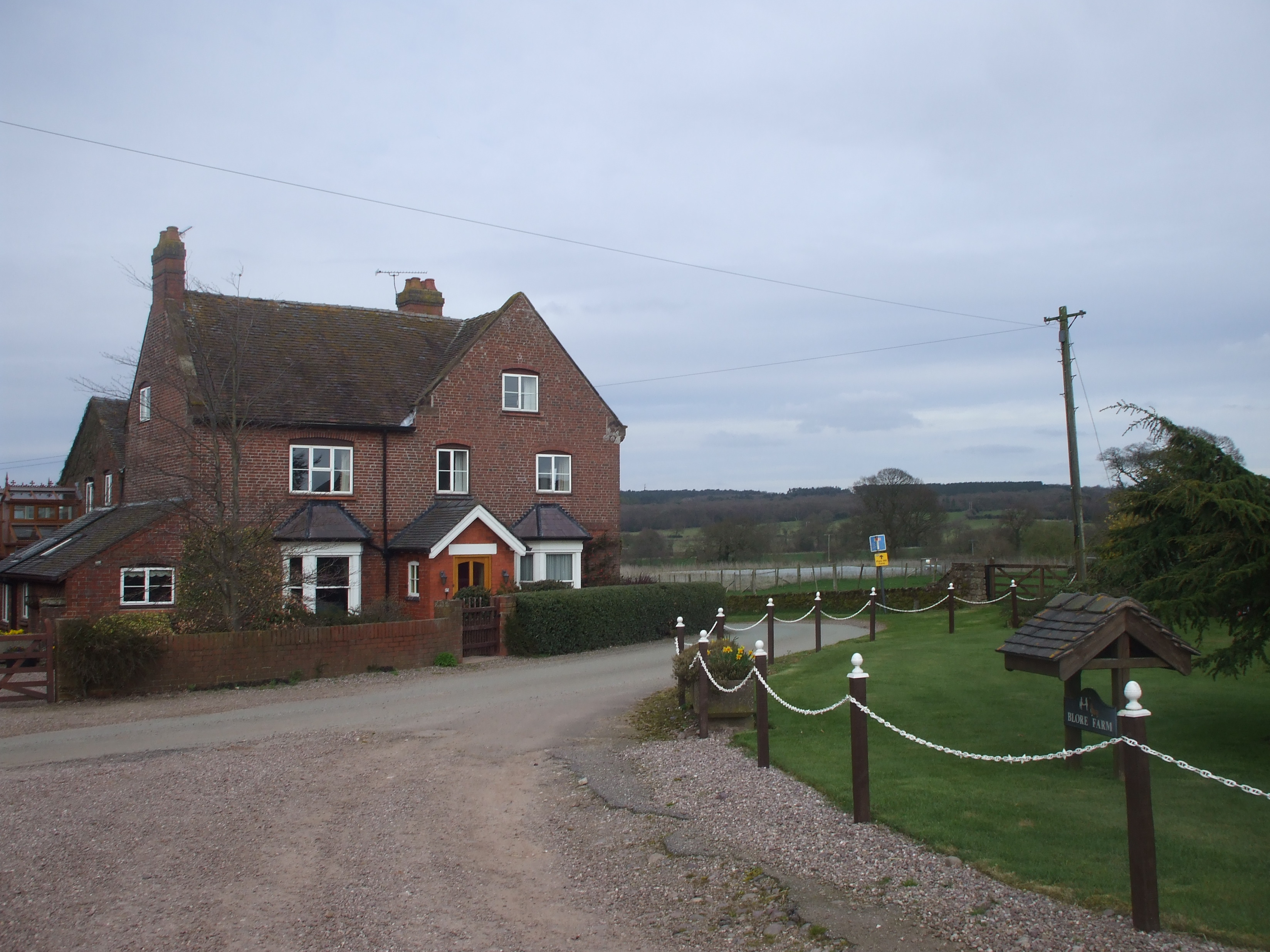
- Blore Farm

- Location within Staffordshire
- OS grid reference: SJ721347
- Civil parish: Loggerheads
- District: Newcastle-under-Lyme
- Shire county: Staffordshire
- Region: West Midlands
- Country: England
- Sovereign state: United Kingdom
- Post town: MARKET DRAYTON
- Postcode district: TF9
- Dialling code: 01630
- Police: Staffordshire
- Fire: Staffordshire
- Ambulance: West Midlands
- UK Parliament: Stone

Blore is a hamlet in the civil parish of Loggerheads, in the Newcastle-under-Lyme district, in north west Staffordshire, England. It lies 3 miles east of Market Drayton in Shropshire.

Blore was first recorded in 1194. The name is of uncertain origin, but may be related to Middle English blura "blister", used metaphorically for a small hill.

The Battle of Blore Heath was fought west of the hamlet in 1459, during the Wars of the Roses.
