= Winnington, Staffordshire =

Coordinates: 52.942°N 2.408°W

Winnington
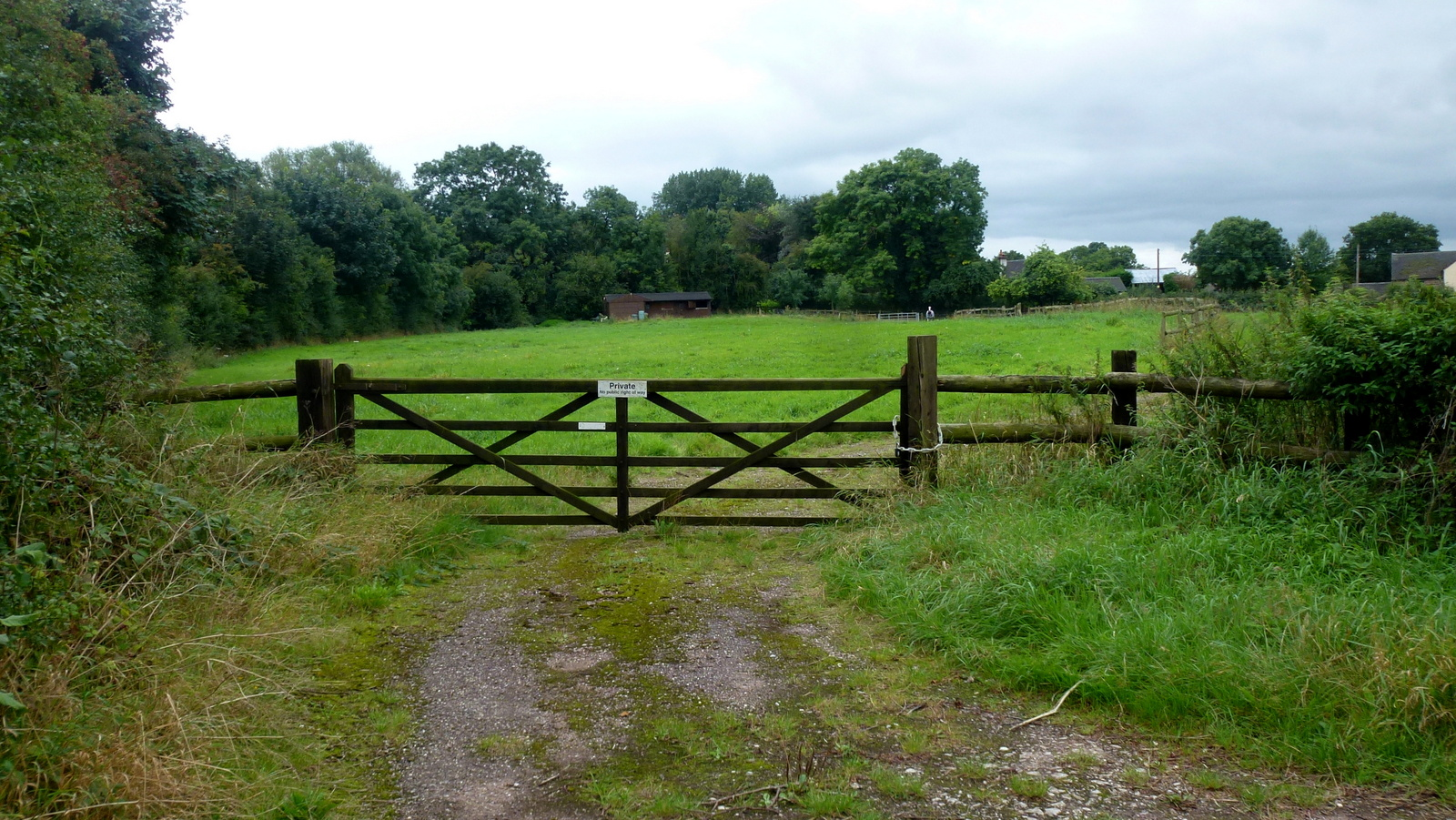
- Gate and paddock at Winnington

- Location within Staffordshire
- OS grid reference: SJ727384
- Civil parish: Loggerheads
- District: Newcastle-under-Lyme
- Shire county: Staffordshire
- Region: West Midlands
- Country: England
- Sovereign state: United Kingdom
- Post town: MARKET DRAYTON
- Postcode district: TF9
- Dialling code: 01630
- Police: Staffordshire
- Fire: Staffordshire
- Ambulance: West Midlands
- UK Parliament: Stone

Winnington is a hamlet in the civil parish of Loggerheads, in the Newcastle-under-Lyme district, in north west Staffordshire, England, close to the border with Shropshire.

Winnington was historically a township in the ancient parish and civil parish of Mucklestone. In 1870-72 the township had a population of 191. It became part of the civil parish of Loggerheads in 1984.

Winnington was mentioned in the Domesday Book of 1086, when it was held by Leofing.
