= Loggerheads, Staffordshire =

Village in Staffordshire, England

Coordinates: 52.9192°N 2.3893°W

Loggerheads
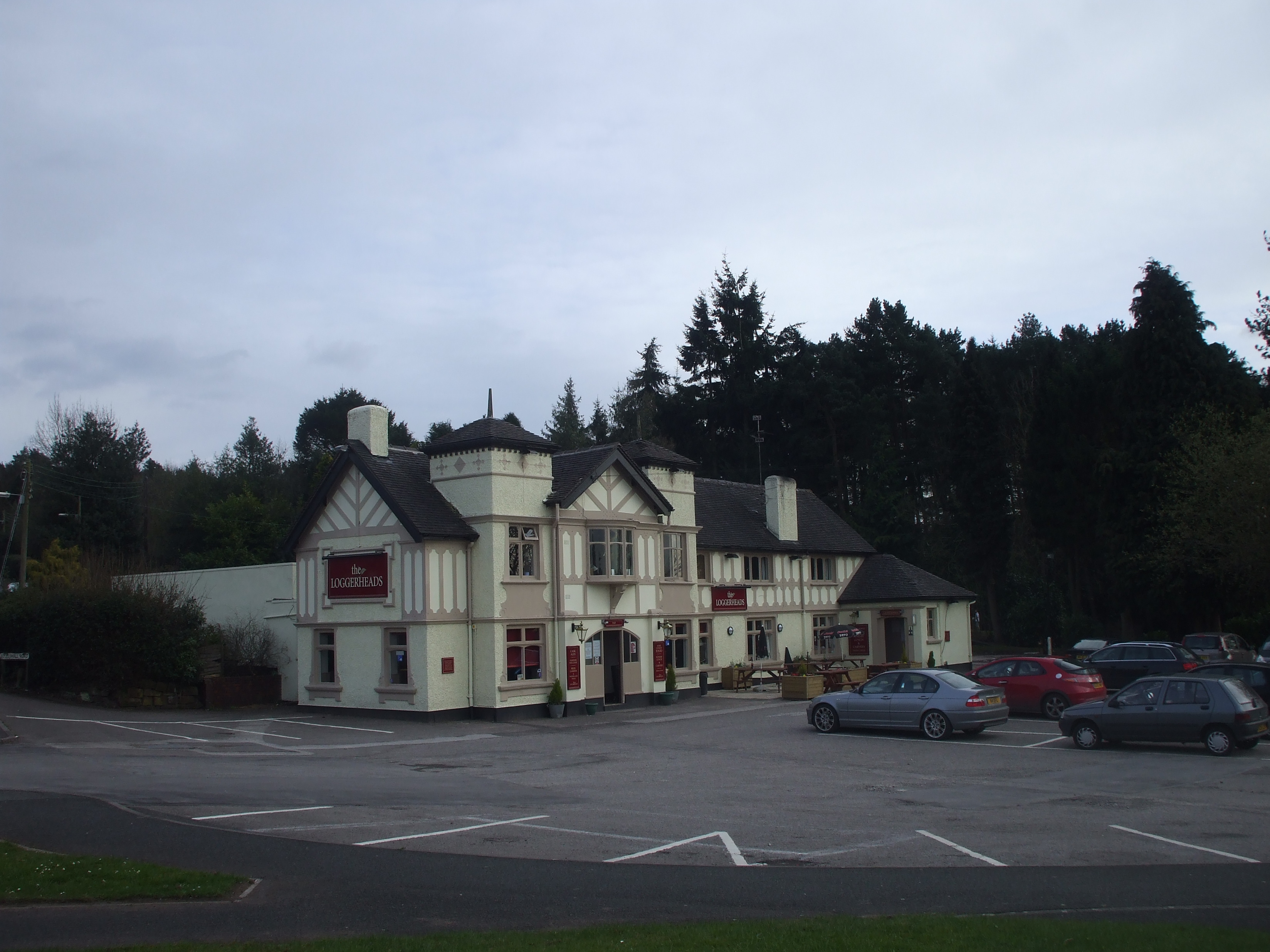
- The Loggerheads public house

- Location within Staffordshire
- Population: 4,480 (2011)
- OS grid reference: SJ739358
- District: Newcastle-under-Lyme
- Shire county: Staffordshire
- Region: West Midlands
- Country: England
- Sovereign state: United Kingdom
- Post town: Market Drayton
- Postcode district: TF9
- Dialling code: 01630
- Police: Staffordshire
- Fire: Staffordshire
- Ambulance: West Midlands
- UK Parliament: Stafford

Loggerheads is a village and civil parish in north-west Staffordshire, England, on the A53 between Market Drayton and Newcastle-under-Lyme. The village is close to the border with Shropshire and Cheshire.

The civil parish extends 6 miles (10 km) north east from the Shropshire Union Canal outside Market Drayton. Apart from Loggerheads, much the largest village in the parish, the parish includes the villages of Almington, Hales, Mucklestone, and Ashley, the hamlets of Blore, Oakley, Napley, Winnington and Knighton, and the northern part of the hamlet of Hookgate.

== Name ==
The village takes its name from that of the public house, which used to be known as The Three Loggerheads and is now simply The Loggerheads. It has been stated that the "Three Loggerheads" meant "Three Fools" although the three leopard heads on the Shrewsbury coat of arms and the Flag of Shropshire are also called "loggerheads".

== History ==
Loggerheads was historically a small hamlet within the parish of Ashley, at the junction of the road from Market Drayton to Newcastle (now the A53) and the road from Eccleshall to Nantwich (now the B5026). It grew rapidly in the 20th century, and in 1984 it became the centre of the new civil parish of Loggerheads, which was formed from the civil parishes of Ashley, Mucklestone and Tyrley, which were abolished.

Loggerheads was home to the Cheshire Joint Sanatorium, a tuberculosis sanitorium, which stood in the 250 acres (100 ha) Burntwood woodland. It was opened in the 1920s and the last two patients were discharged in October 1969. The premises stood empty for a few years until Newcastle-under-Lyme Borough Council purchased the site for redevelopment in 1977.

The Burntwood, part of the Blore Forest, was once a large oak woodland but is now predominantly coniferous. The oak trees were removed to make way for the quicker growing softwoods which are of higher commercial value.

Loggerheads has a large number of listed buildings.

== Notable people ==
- Francesca Mills, actor, grew up in Loggerheads.

== Schools ==
- The Hugo Meynell Primary School
- St Mary's School Mucklestone: website

== Other places nearby ==
- Market Drayton
- Whitmore
- Woore
- Croxton
- Eccleshall

== See also ==
- Listed buildings in Loggerheads, Staffordshire
- Listed buildings in Shrewsbury (southeast central area) includes the Loggerheads Public House in Shrewsbury, which displays the three "loggerheads" (leopard heads) of the Shrewsbury coat of arms
