= Oakley Hall, Staffordshire =

Historic mansion house in Staffordshire, UK

Coordinates: 52.9291°N 2.4457°W

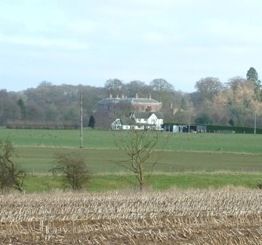
Oakley hall

Oakley Hall is an early 18th century 14,929 sf mansion house at Oakley, Staffordshire, England, in the parish of Mucklestone, near the Shropshire town of Market Drayton. It is a Grade II* listed building.

The Chetwode family who from about the 13th century owned the Chetwode Manor estate in Buckinghamshire also held the manor of Oakley. There was a substantial manor house at Oakley in the 16th century.

In about 1710 Sir John Chetwode, Baronet, (High Sheriff of Staffordshire in 1691 and 1698) replaced the old house with a two-storey mansion. The house is built of brick on a sandstone plinth with a balustraded entrance front of eleven bays, the central three of which were pedimented. Two sphinx-like statues with female heads flank the main entrance.

The 1881 census discloses the 6th Baronet and his family in residence with a staff of fifteen servants. The Chetwodes sold the estate in 1919. It was already by then in the family of Cyril Charles Dennis, High Sheriff of Staffordshire (wife Mary Scott Dennis [nee Macfie], who kept 21 members of staff and was responsible for putting central heating throughout the hall. He had sons, both seriously injured before and during World War II: Ian and Lance (Spitfire V pilot) (grandsons: Honourable Professor Royal Biology Society Dr Roger L H Dennis [Internationally recognised butterfly biologist, and who saved a boy's life in the Teign estuary in 1959 when only 10 years old] and Cyril T H Dennis [Veterinary Surgeon and Oriental ceramics expert]), daughters Mary [grandson: Martin Peel Esq. and Primrose) until 1948 when he retired to the dower house, Park House Villa in the grounds where he died in 1964). The family holds two coats of Arms, the Dennis Family reflecting their link with the Norman Conquest and being bestowed lands by William I; and his wife a descendant of the Kings of Dalriada. Her great-great-grandfather, Provost of Leith, was the first person to greet a Georgian king (George IV) to Scotland. Her family motto is Pro Rege though he respectfully turned down a hereditary baronetcy. The Dennis family motto is suaviter sed fortiter; they built their fortunes in the 18th and 19th centuries in the chemical industry (Bordeaux Mixture and sugar industry) and were responsible for the construction of Truro Cathedral main tower in 1904.

== See also ==
- Grade II* listed buildings in Staffordshire
- Listed buildings in Loggerheads, Staffordshire
