= Oakley, Staffordshire =

Hamlet in Staffordshire, England

Coordinates: 52.92°N 02.44°W

Oakley
- Location within Staffordshire
- OS grid reference: SJ7036
- Civil parish: Loggerheads
- Shire county: Staffordshire
- Region: West Midlands
- Country: England
- Sovereign state: United Kingdom
- Police: Staffordshire
- Fire: Staffordshire
- Ambulance: West Midlands

Oakley is a hamlet in Staffordshire, England. It is within Mucklestone ward of Loggerheads Parish. Oakley Hall, a former seat of the Chetwode family, is a well-known attraction.
