= Butterton-Swynnerton dykes =

Geological feature in England

The Butterton-Swynnerton dykes (or sometimes singularly, the Butterton dyke) are an assemblage of igneous intrusions which extend in a roughly north-northwest to south-southeast alignment through Staffordshire in the English Midlands.

The dykes were first identified in the 1840s by Charles Darwin and separately by James Kirkby. Besides their surface outcrop, geophysical techniques (gravity and magnetic surveys) have allowed their course to be mapped in some detail over a 15 km long corridor which, in the case of parallel intrusions, is up to 750m wide in places. The dykes which are near-vertical though hading to the west at up to 15°, vary from about 1m to a maximum of 27m in width. The dykes are of variable composition but are generally of the alkaline-basalt type. The east–west trending Swynnerton fault offsets the dyke in a sinistral manner. Spheroidal weathering of exposed sections of the dykes has focussed on cooling joints present within the body of intrusive rock.

Radiometric dating of the dykes has returned ages of around 52 million years for their emplacement though an older age of around 61 million years has also been suggested by measurements. Small scale contact metamorphism of the country rocks into which the dykes were intruded has been noted at several localities.

Other dykes of this general age in northern England have been associated with volcanism which took place at the Isle of Mull igneous centre in western Scotland during the early Palaeogene Period at a time of regional crustal tension associated with the opening of the north Atlantic Ocean and which resulted in the intrusion of innumerable dykes.
