= Maer, Staffordshire =

Village in Staffordshire, England

Coordinates: 52.9412°N 2.3181°W

Maer
- Location within Staffordshire
- Population: 489 (2011)
- OS grid reference: SJ787382
- District: Newcastle-under-Lyme
- Shire county: Staffordshire
- Region: West Midlands
- Country: England
- Sovereign state: United Kingdom
- Post town: Newcastle
- Postcode district: ST5
- Dialling code: 01782
- Police: Staffordshire
- Fire: Staffordshire
- Ambulance: West Midlands
- UK Parliament: Stafford

Maer is a rural village and civil parish in the Borough of Newcastle-under-Lyme, Staffordshire, England, to the west of the pottery manufacturing city of Stoke-on-Trent.

The parish church of St Peter dates from 1612. It has a funeral monument to Sir John and Lady Bowyer.

Maer's main feature is the large 17th-century stone-built country house, Maer Hall, built on a slope above a small lake, or "mere", which gave the house and estate its name. The hall became the home of Josiah Wedgwood II and was frequently visited by his nephew Charles Darwin, who went on to marry Josiah's daughter Emma at St. Peter's Church, which stands higher on the hillside, close to the hall. When she was young, Emma helped her older sister Elizabeth with the Sunday School, which was held in Maer Hall laundry, giving sixty village children their only formal training in reading, writing and religion. The grave of Josiah Wedgwood II and his wife Elizabeth in the churchyard has a view down over the hall.

Nearby is Berth Hill, an Iron Age hillfort.

== See also ==
- Listed buildings in Maer, Staffordshire
