= Mucklestone =

Village in Staffordshire, England

Coordinates: 52.9341°N 2.4105°W

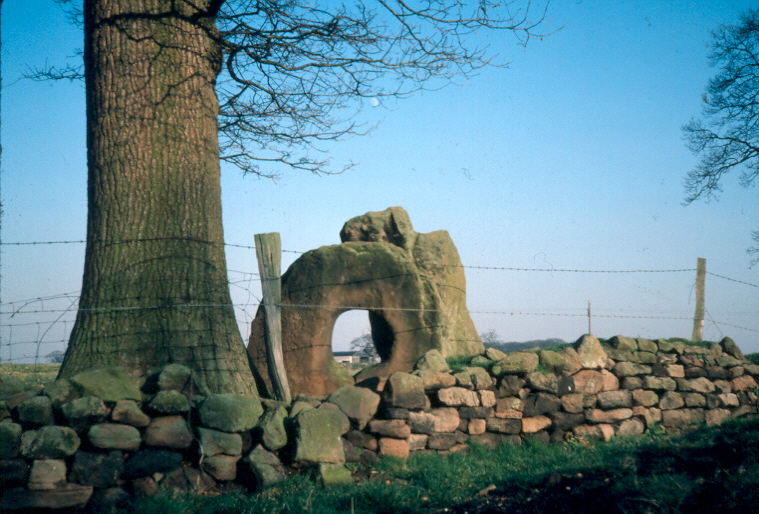
- The devil's ring and finger

- Location within Staffordshire
- OS grid reference: SJ725375
- Civil parish: Loggerheads
- District: Newcastle-under-Lyme
- Shire county: Staffordshire
- Region: West Midlands
- Country: England
- Sovereign state: United Kingdom
- Post town: Market Drayton
- Postcode district: TF9
- Dialling code: 01630
- Police: Staffordshire
- Fire: Staffordshire
- Ambulance: West Midlands
- UK Parliament: Stafford

Mucklestone is a village and former civil parish, now in the parish of Loggerheads, in the Newcastle-under-Lyme district, in the county of Staffordshire, England. It is about nine miles (14 km) northwest of Eccleshall, and four and a half miles northeast of Market Drayton in Shropshire. In 1961 the parish had a population of 409. On 1 April 1984 the parish was abolished to form Loggerheads.

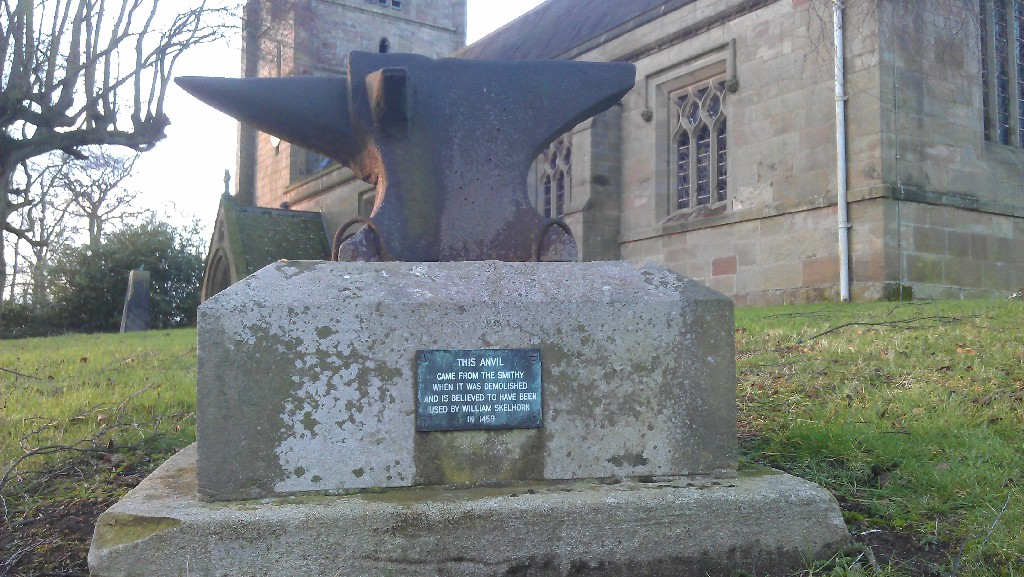
The anvil said to have belonged to Skelhorn

It is notable for its associations with the Battle of Blore Heath. According to legend, Queen Margaret of Anjou is said to have watched the defeat of her forces from the church tower, before fleeing on horse-back. It is said that Margaret employed the local blacksmith, William Skelhorn, to reverse the shoes on her horse to disguise her getaway. An anvil said to have belonged to Skelhorn stands in the churchyard to commemorate the event.

The ancient parish of Mucklestone was about six miles (9.7 km) in length, and from one to two miles (3.2 km) in breadth, extending along the borders of the counties of Shropshire and Staffordshire. Five of traditional townships, Aston, Knighton, Mucklestone, Oakley and Winnington are in Staffordshire and the other four, Bearstone, Dorrington, Gravenhunger and Woore, are in Shropshire.

This parish originally comprised 8,120 acres (33 km^{2}), of which 4,362 acres (18 km^{2}) were in Staffordshire. Mucklestone township contains about 1,100 acres (4 km^{2}). Aston, a village and township, three and a half miles north-east of Mucklestone, and eight miles (13 km) south-west of Newcastle-under-Lyme, contains 912 acres (3.7 km^{2}). Knighton is a small township, one mile (1.6 km) south-west of Aston, bounded on three sides by Shropshire. Oakley township at the south end of the parish, two miles (3.2 km) south-west of Mucklestone, contains Oakley Hall, in a beautiful park of 300 acres (1.2 km^{2}), on the east bank of the River Tern, which locally divides Staffordshire from Shropshire. Winnington township, has a small village one mile (1.6 km) north of Mucklestone.

The church of Saint Mary at Mucklestone, which originally served the whole of the ancient parish, is in the decorated style. Except for the tower, it was rebuilt according to church records in 1789 and again in 1883 by Lynam and Rickman in keeping with the surviving medieval tower. It contains stained glass windows, designed by Charles Kempe in the 19th century including commemorations of the Battle of Blore Heath.

Other local structures of merit include a Georgian Folly; an important house of earlier date known as Willoughbridge Lodge; warm springs (discovered in the 17th century) and known, together with the ruined bath house c1682, as Willoughbridge Wells; and also Oakley Hall built about 1710.

A Neolithic monument sits along the western perimeter of the great park of Oakley Hall at Mucklestone. Possibly the remains of a burial-mound, it comprises two big stones. One is round with a 20-inch-diameter (510 mm) hole in the middle. The other is six feet tall and slender. Locally the stones are known as the "devil's ring and finger".

== See also ==
- Listed buildings in Loggerheads, Staffordshire
