= Maer Hall =

Grade II listed 17th-century country house in Maer, Staffordshire, England

Coordinates: 52.942°N 2.311°W

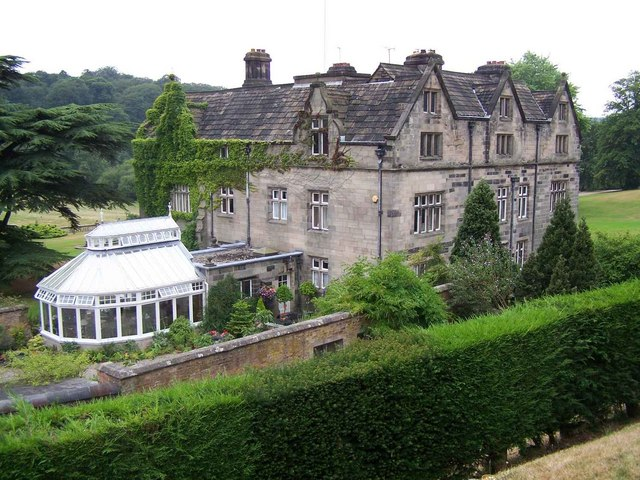
Maer Hall

Maer Hall is a large Grade II listed 17th-century country house in Maer, Staffordshire, set in a park which is listed Grade II in Historic England's Register of Parks and Gardens

The large stone-built country house and estate of Maer Hall dominate the village of Maer. Its location in the district of Newcastle-under-Lyme, Staffordshire, England, is attractively rural, but fairly close to the pottery manufacturing area around Stoke-on-Trent which attracted its most famous owner Josiah Wedgwood II. His nephew Charles Darwin often visited Maer, and married Josiah's daughter Emma.

A manor house at Maer dates back to 1282, the owner then being William de Mere. The present stone house was built around 1680 on a slope above a small lake, or "mere", which gave the house its name. In the 18th century the landscape designer Capability Brown altered the lake in a scheme of pleasure grounds. The house could be approached from either the north entrance with its grade II listed lodge, or from the village of Maer to the south with its grade II* listed gatehouse.

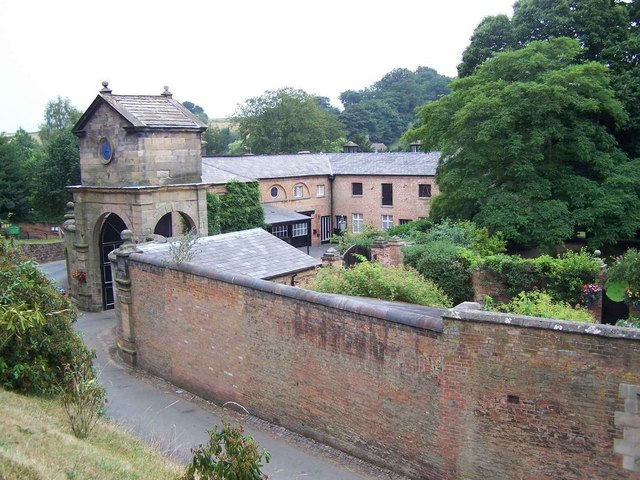
Maer Hall Gatehouse

It lay only 7 miles (11 km) from the Etruria Works of the pottery manufacturer Josiah Wedgwood II, and in 1802 he bought the estate, borrowing money his brother-in-law Robert to fund the purchase before the sale of his Dorset estates. He had the house prepared, with the park being laid out by the landscape designer John Webb, and in 1807 the family moved in. There was a pleasant freedom of speech in the family, with everyone speaking their mind without restraint. They frequently exchanged visits to and from their Darwin relatives only 20 miles (30 km) away, and the young Charles Darwin found it a welcome contrast to the stricter approach of his father. Charles gained much useful information from his relatives during the inception of Darwin's theory, and it was at Maer Hall that he first became interested in the effects of the burrowing of earthworms, which were the subject of an early paper presented to the Geological Society as well as of his last book. He proposed to Emma Wedgwood at Maer Hall, and they were married at St Peter’s Church, which stands close by on the hillside overlooking the Hall.

After the death of Josiah Wedgwood II in 1843 the property was sold to William Davenport of the Davenport Pottery, who added a huge clock tower and more stables, but these were knocked down in the 1960s, restoring the appearance of the original 17th-century Hall. For most of the 20th century it was the home of the Harrison family, owners of the Harrison Shipping Line.

== See also ==
- Listed buildings in Maer, Staffordshire
