= Knighton, Newcastle-under-Lyme =

Hamlet in Staffordshire, England

Coordinates: 52.9569°N 2.4049°W

Knighton
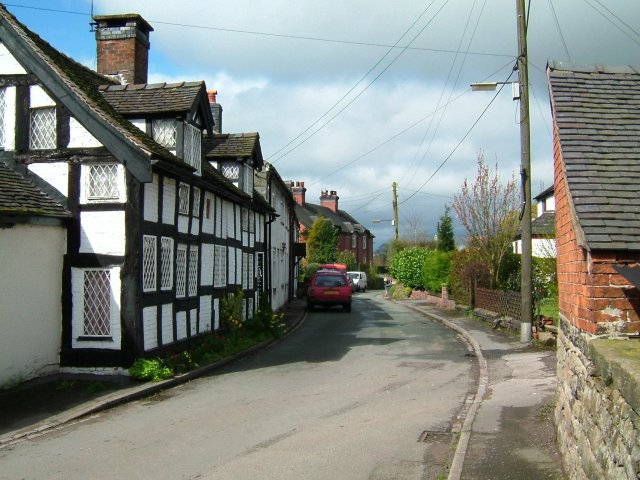
- Cottages on Smithy Lane

- Location within Staffordshire
- OS grid reference: SJ728400
- Civil parish: Loggerheads
- District: Newcastle-under-Lyme
- Shire county: Staffordshire
- Region: West Midlands
- Country: England
- Sovereign state: United Kingdom
- Post town: MARKET DRAYTON
- Postcode district: TF9
- Dialling code: 01630
- Police: Staffordshire
- Fire: Staffordshire
- Ambulance: West Midlands
- UK Parliament: Stone

Knighton is a hamlet in north west Staffordshire, England, located in the Borough of Newcastle-under-Lyme.

It is surrounded to the west, north and east by Shropshire and can only be accessed by vehicle by passing through Shropshire. A public footpath running southwards, across fields, is the only way to access the settlement from the rest of Staffordshire without crossing into Shropshire. The B5026 road runs through Knighton.

There is a public house - the White Lion.
