= Hales, Staffordshire =

Village in Staffordshire, England

Coordinates: 52.902354°N 2.427914°W

Hales
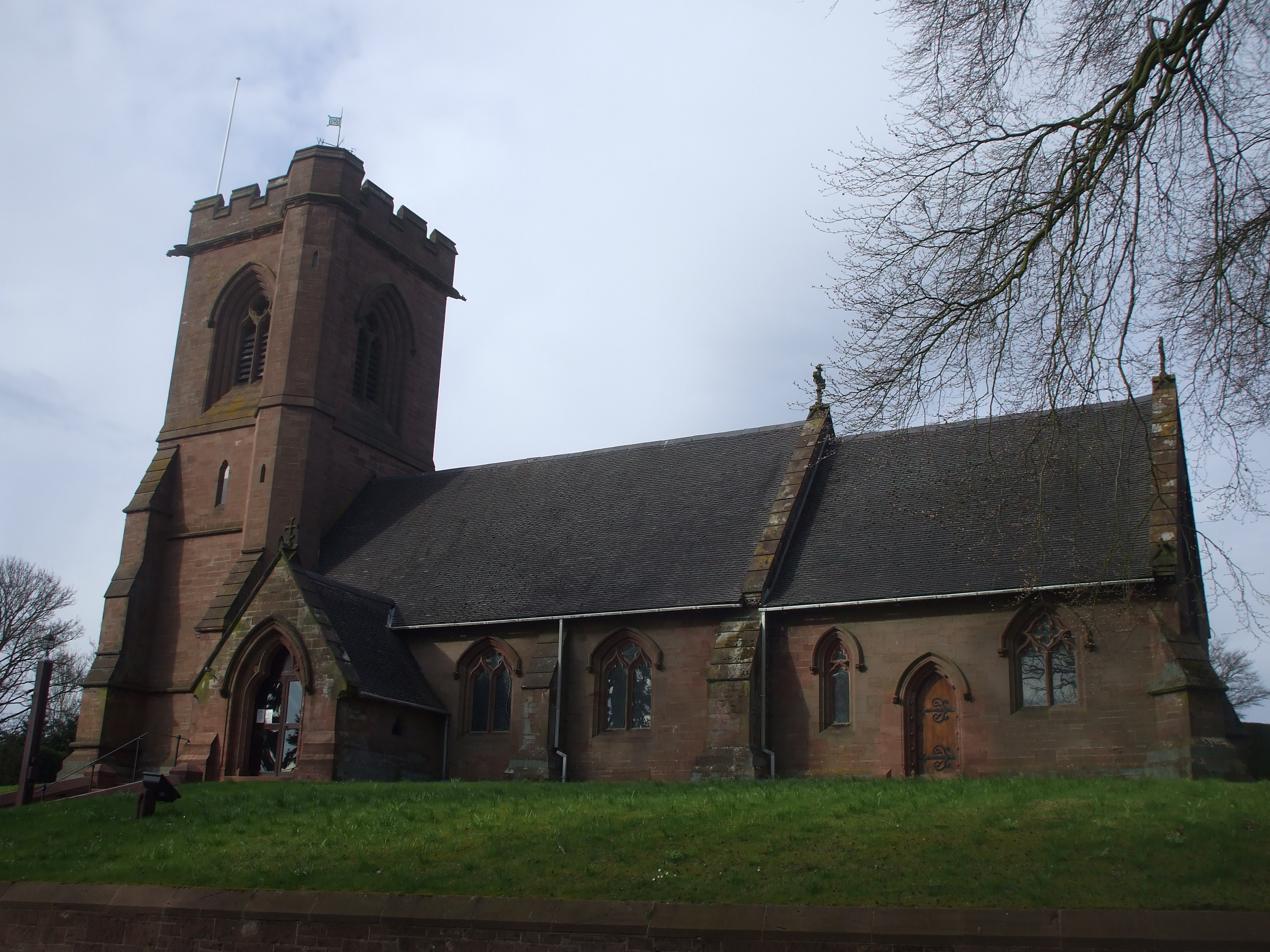
- St Mary's Church, Hales

- Location within Staffordshire
- OS grid reference: SJ712340
- Civil parish: Loggerheads
- Shire county: Staffordshire
- Region: West Midlands
- Country: England
- Sovereign state: United Kingdom
- Post town: Market Drayton
- Postcode district: TF9
- Police: Staffordshire
- Fire: Staffordshire
- Ambulance: West Midlands
- UK Parliament: Stafford

Hales is a village in Staffordshire approximately 2 miles east of Market Drayton. Population details as taken at the 2011 census can be found under Loggerheads. There is an Anglican church dedicated to Saint Mary.

Near the village is the remains of a Roman villa dating from around 100AD. Excavation of the site showed earlier building on the site.

== See also ==
- Listed buildings in Loggerheads, Staffordshire
