= Whitmore, Staffordshire =

Village in Staffordshire, England

Coordinates: 52.9642°N 2.2834°W

Whitmore
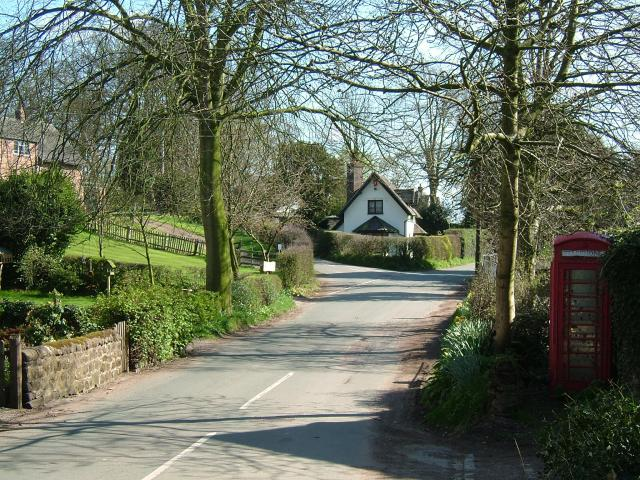

- Location within Staffordshire
- Population: 1,554 (2011)
- OS grid reference: SJ810407
- District: Newcastle-under-Lyme
- Shire county: Staffordshire
- Region: West Midlands
- Country: England
- Sovereign state: United Kingdom
- Post town: Newcastle
- Postcode district: ST5
- Dialling code: 01782
- Police: Staffordshire
- Fire: Staffordshire
- Ambulance: West Midlands
- UK Parliament: Stafford

Whitmore is a village, civil parish and small curacy in the county of Staffordshire, England, near Newcastle-under-Lyme.

== Village ==
Besides Whitmore, the parish also includes the hamlets of Acton, Butterton and Shutlanehead.

The name Whitmore can be found in the Domesday Book (as Witemore) and also when King John signed Magna Carta at Runnymede.

Whitmore Hall, designated a house of outstanding architectural and historical interest and a fine example of a small Carolean-style manor house, is the home of the Cavenagh-Mainwaring family.

Butterton gives its name to the Butterton-Swynnerton dykes, a set of igneous intrusion of Palaeogene age which run NNW-SSE through the area. Butterton dyke was discovered by Charles Darwin in 1842.

== See also ==
- Listed buildings in Whitmore, Staffordshire
