= Ashley, Staffordshire =

Village in Staffordshire, England

Coordinates: 52.9243°N 2.3553°W

Ashley
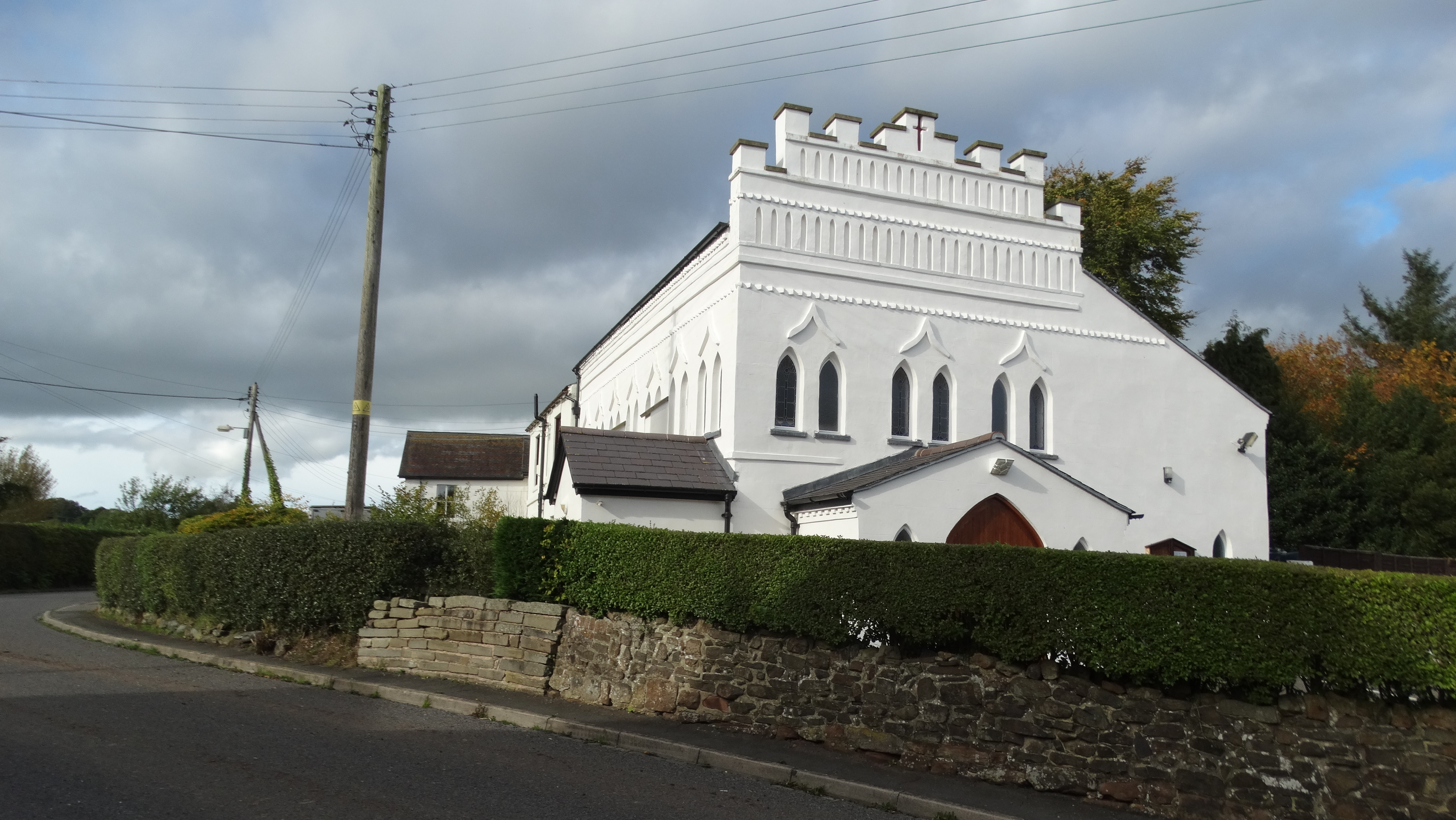

- Location within Staffordshire
- Population: 508 (2001 Census)
- OS grid reference: SJ762363
- Civil parish: Loggerheads
- District: Newcastle-under-Lyme
- Shire county: Staffordshire
- Region: West Midlands
- Country: England
- Sovereign state: United Kingdom
- Post town: Market Drayton
- Postcode district: TF9
- Dialling code: 01630
- Police: Staffordshire
- Fire: Staffordshire
- Ambulance: West Midlands
- UK Parliament: Stafford

Ashley is a village and former civil parish, now in the parish of Loggerheads, in the Newcastle-under-Lyme district, in the county of Staffordshire, England. According to the 2001 census it had a population of 508. The village is close to the border of Shropshire, adjacent to Loggerheads, and is 4 miles (6 km) northeast of Market Drayton.

== History ==
Ashley is a place-name derived from the Old English words æsċ (“ash”) and lēah (“meadow”). Ashley Dale and Jugbank. Mainly sandstone cottages now mixed in with modern housing.

The church of St John the Baptist possesses a 17th-century tower with the remainder built in 1860-62 by J. Ashdown of London in a style representative of the 13th-14th century. The church is notable for its collection of funerary art from several centuries. The spectacular tomb of Sir Gilbert Gerard (d. 1592) and his wife Anne Radcliffe (d. 1608) was later supplemented by free-standing, kneeling figures of their son, Thomas Gerard, 1st Baron Gerard and his son, Gibert 2nd Baron Gerard. This composite family group dominates the Gerard Chapel, on the north side of the church. This is balanced on the south side by the Kinnersley Chapel, containing the memorials of the Kinnersleys of Clough Hall. Most impressive is the sculpture of Thomas Kinnersley I, by Francis Leggatt Chantrey. His son and successor is commemorated by a large and elaborate structure, the work of Matthew Noble.

Near to the church is a mound as yet unexcavated but thought to be a burial ground from the time of the Black Death.

The Roman Catholic chapel of Our Lady and St John is not far from St John the Baptist. The church and rectory are just one building with a hint of gothic-like adornments on a colour washed stucco. The chapel was designed by the same architect priest, Fr James Egan, as Holy Trinity Church in Newcastle-under-Lyme.

In 1961 the parish had a population of 1237. On 1 April 1984 the parish was abolished to form Loggerheads.

Funerary art in St John's church, Ashley

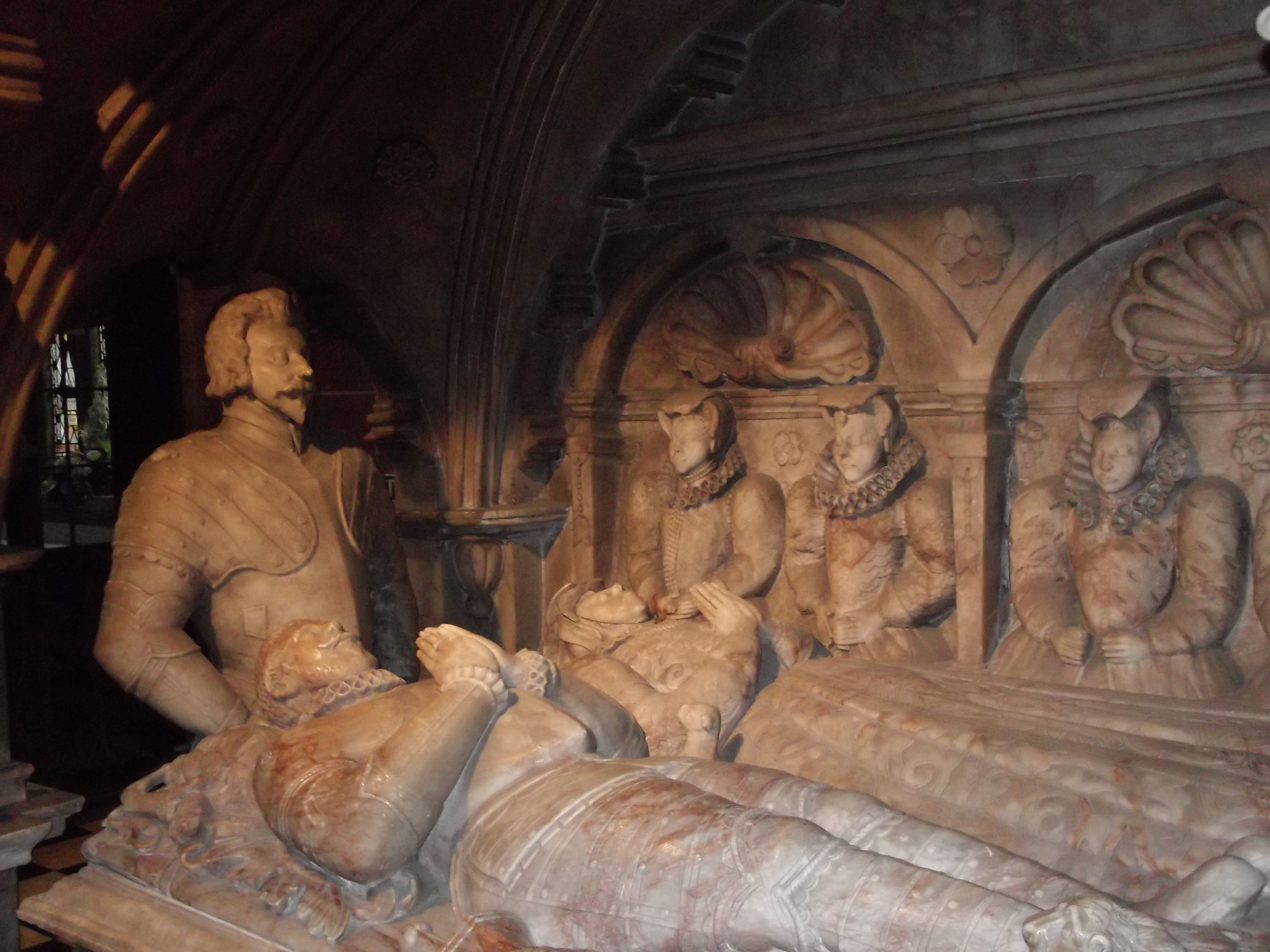
The Gerard Family: Thomas, 1st Baron Gerard (kneeling); Gilbert Gerard, Attorney General 1559–81; Anne Radcliffe. Gerard Chapel, Church of St John the Baptist, Ashley, Staffordshire.

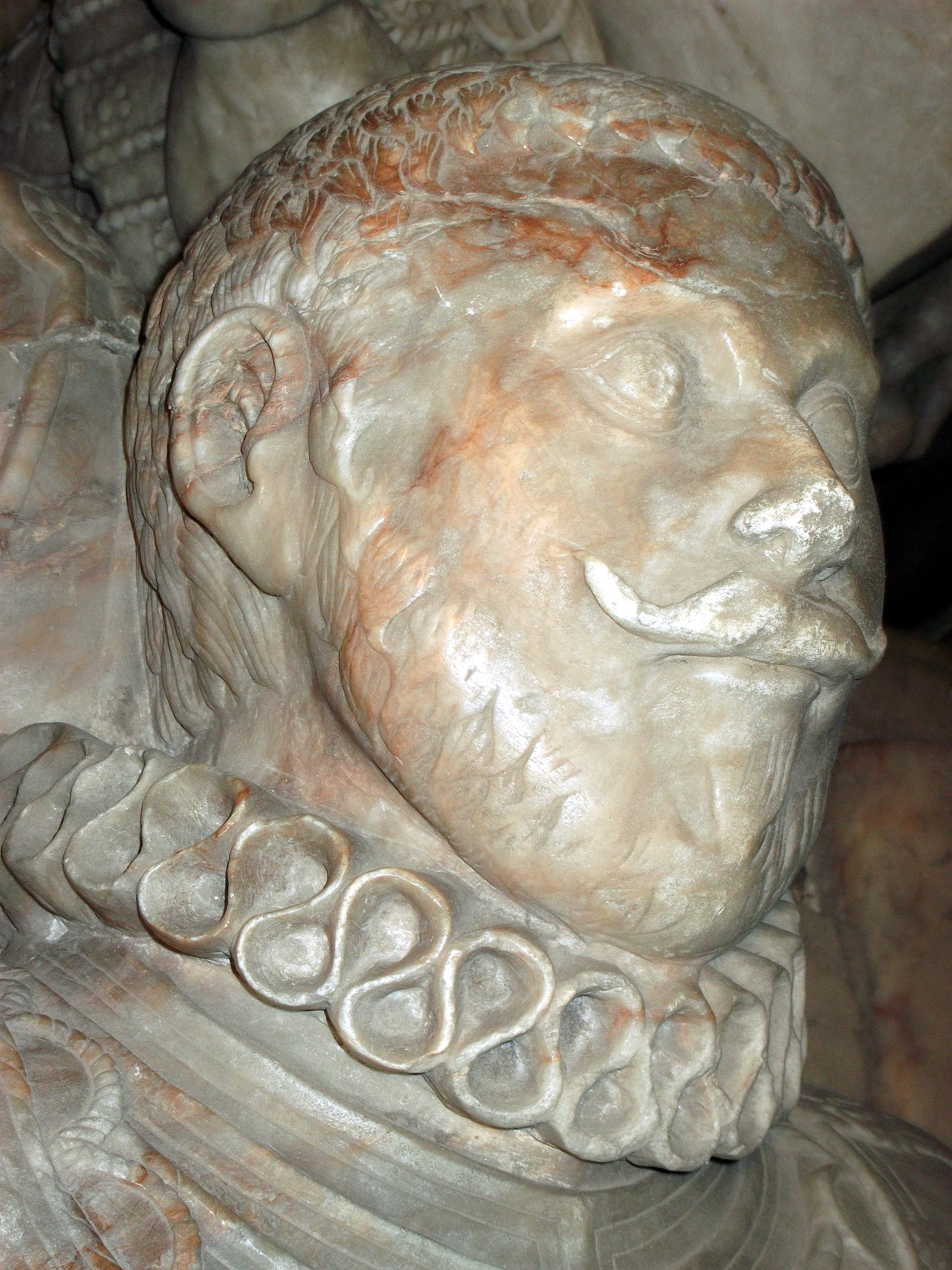
Sir Gilbert Gerard (before 1523–1593), Attorney General 1559–81, Master of the Rolls 1581–93.

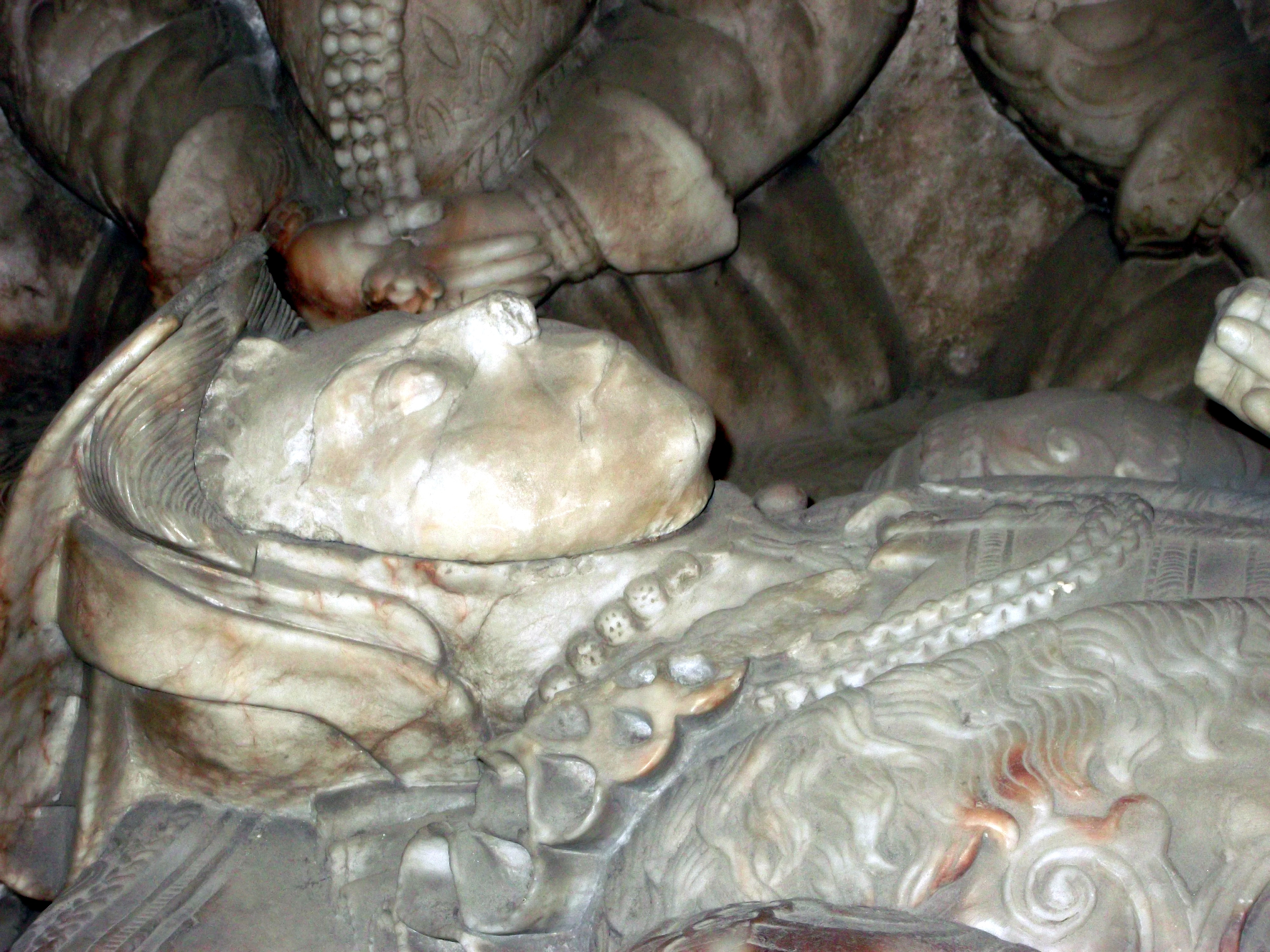
Anne Radcliffe of Winmarleigh, Lancashire, wife of Gilbert Gerard and mother of Thomas.

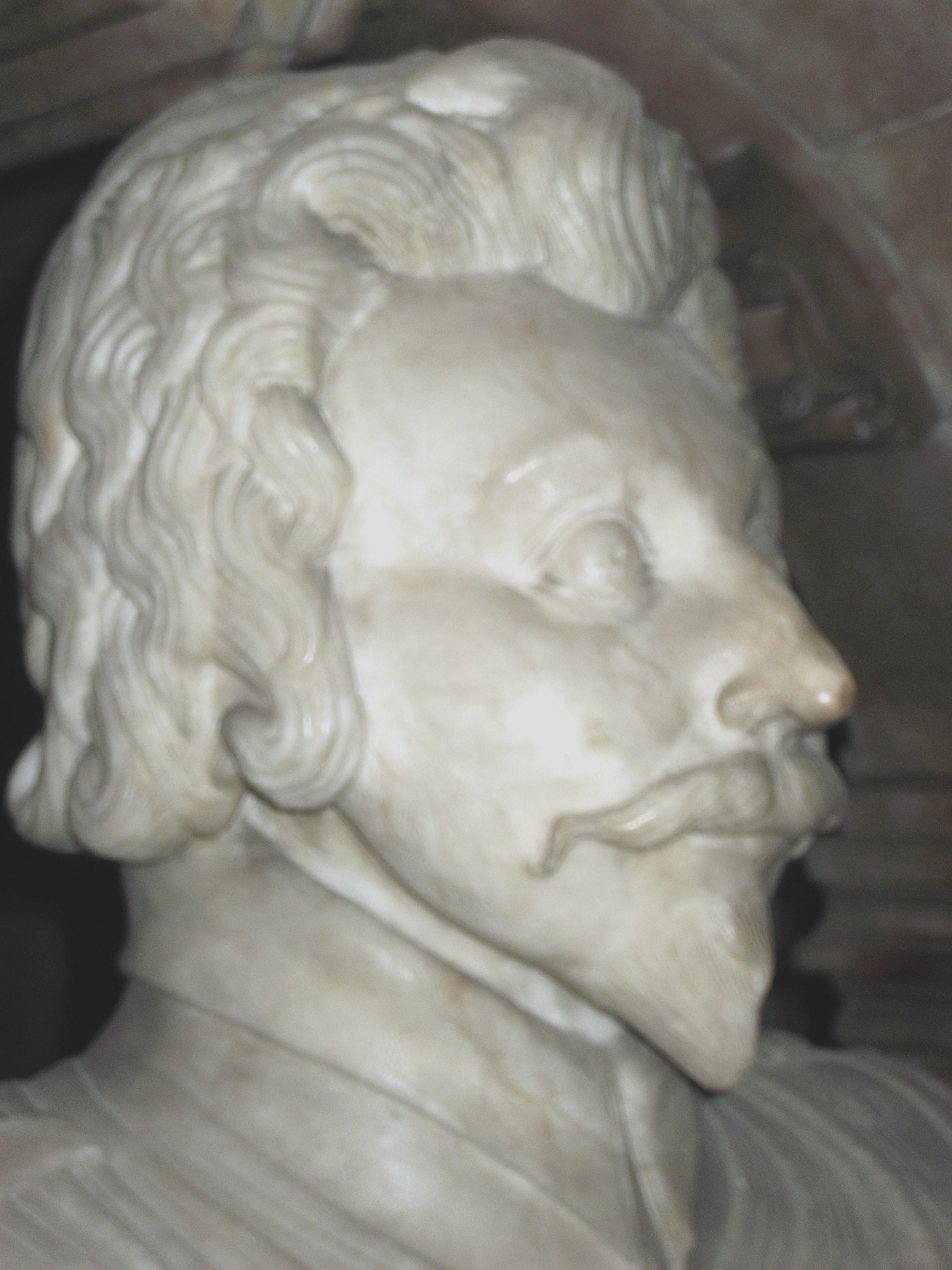
Thomas Gerard, 1st Baron Gerard (c.1554-1618), son of Sir Gilbert.

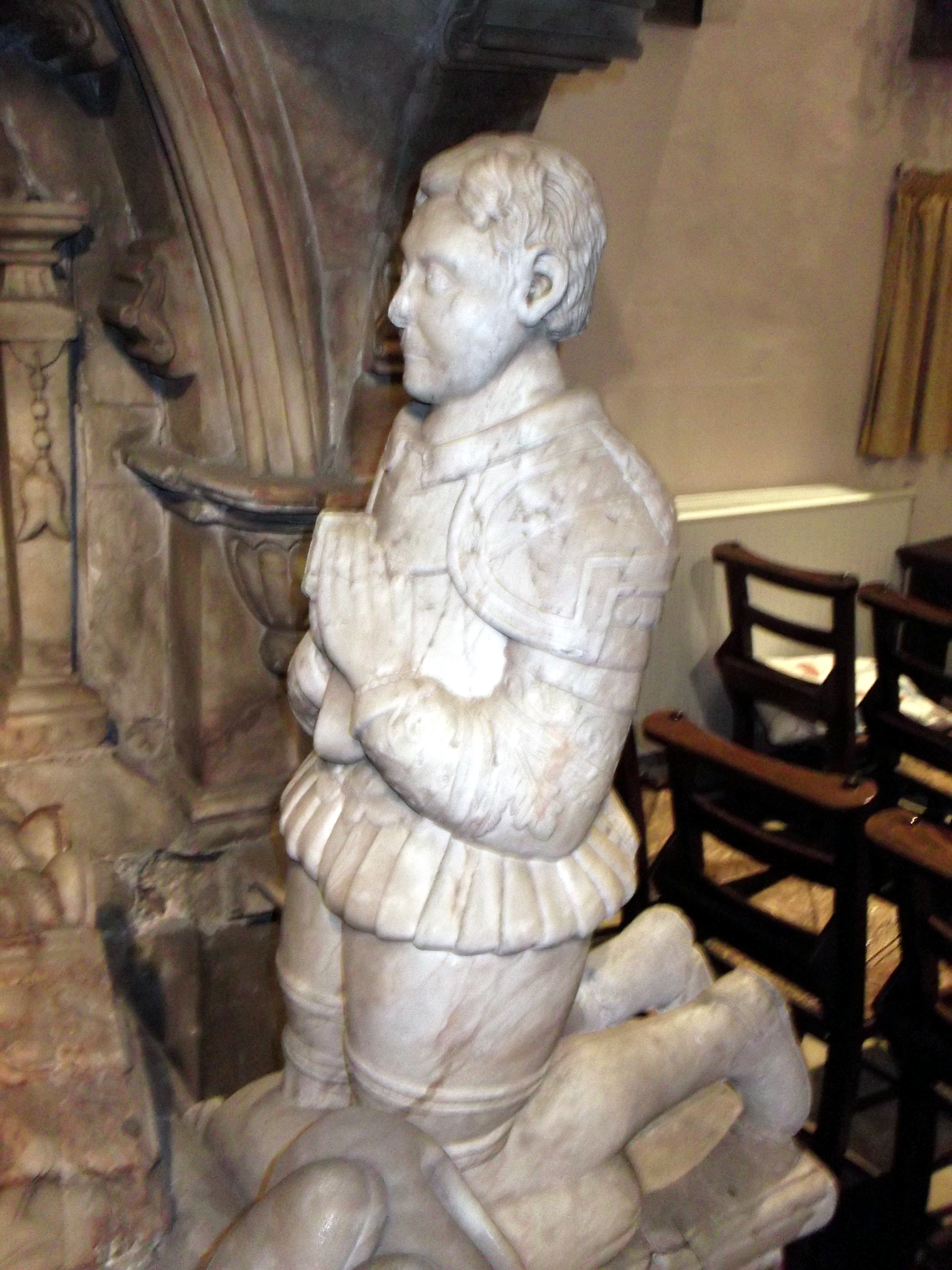
Gilbert, 2nd Baron Gerard (d.1622).

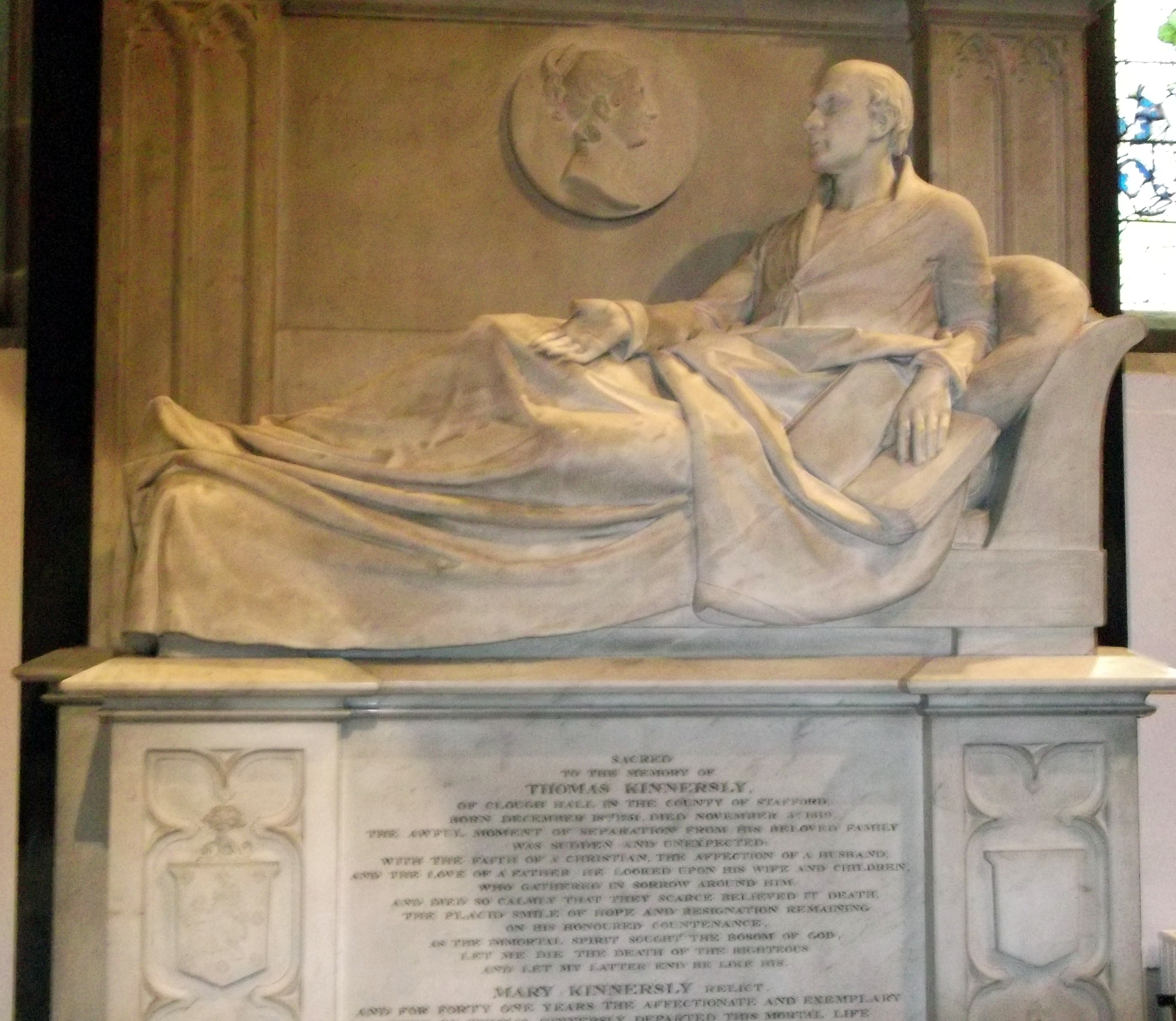
Thomas Kinnersley I (d.1819), by Francis Legatt Chantrey.

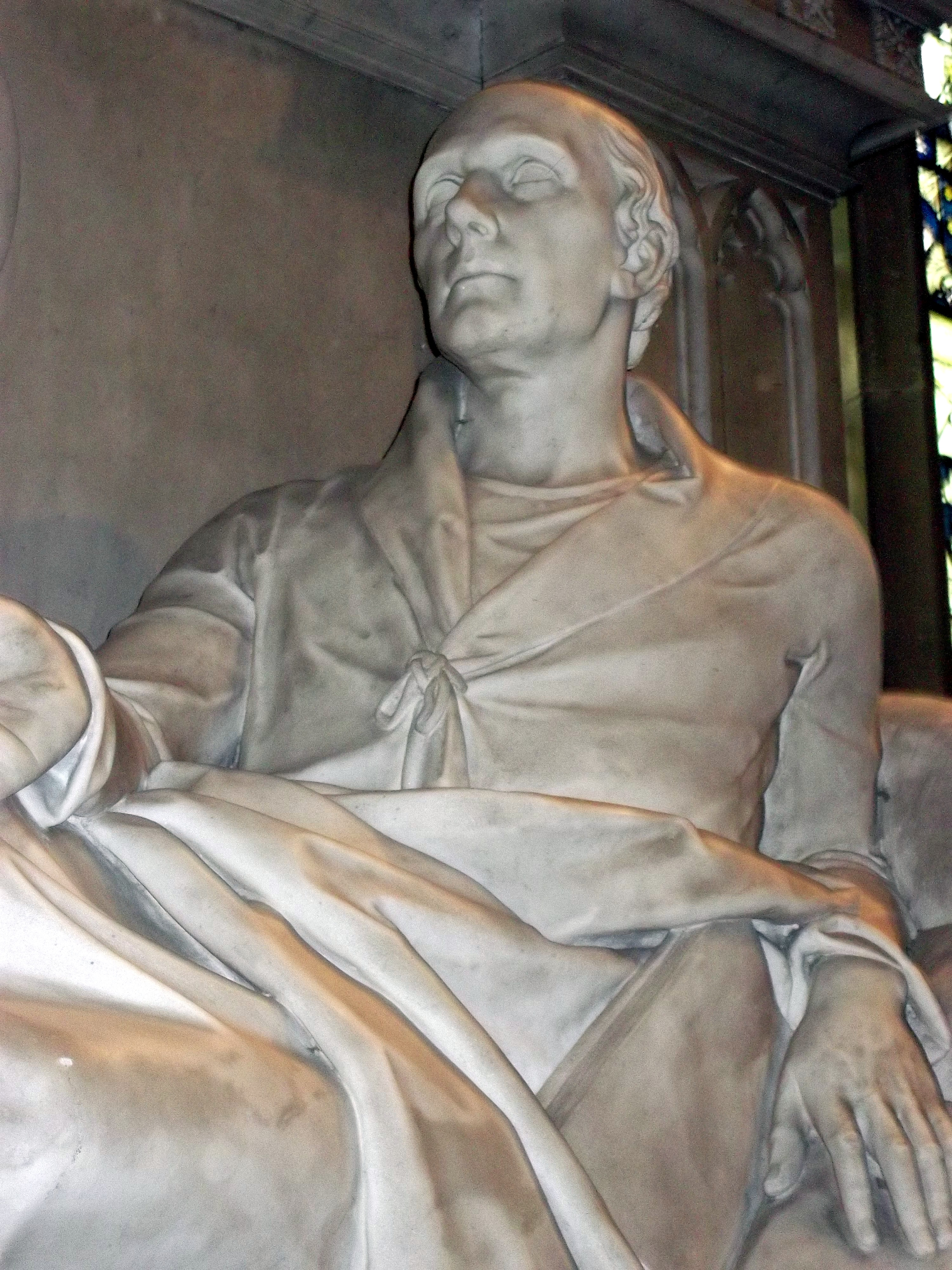
Close-up of Chantrey's sculpture of Thomas Kinnersley I.

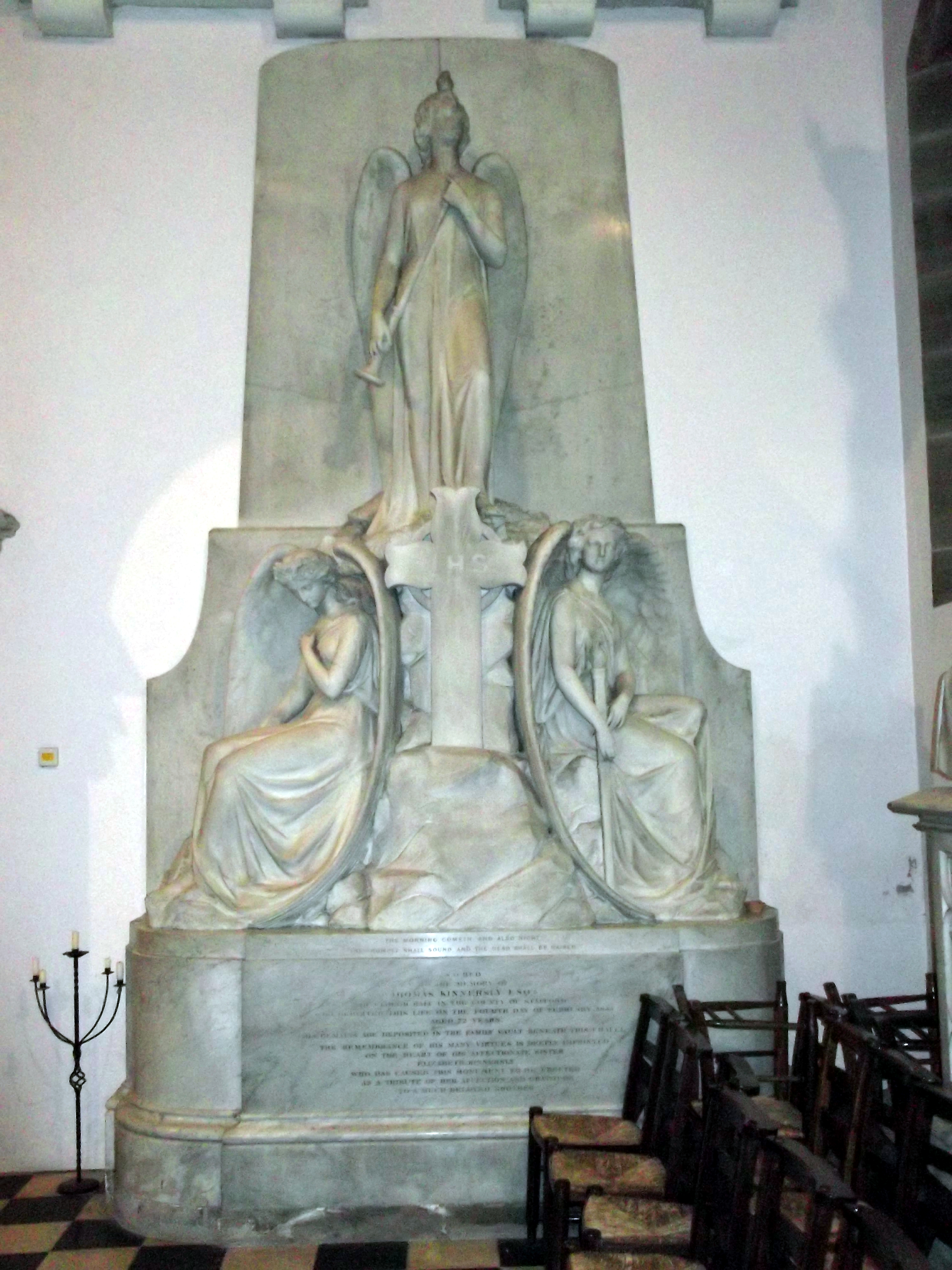
Memorial to Thomas Kinnersley II (d.1855), by Matthew Noble.

== See also ==
- Listed buildings in Loggerheads, Staffordshire
