= Autherley Junction =

Canal junction in England

Coordinates: 52°36′57″N 2°08′46″W

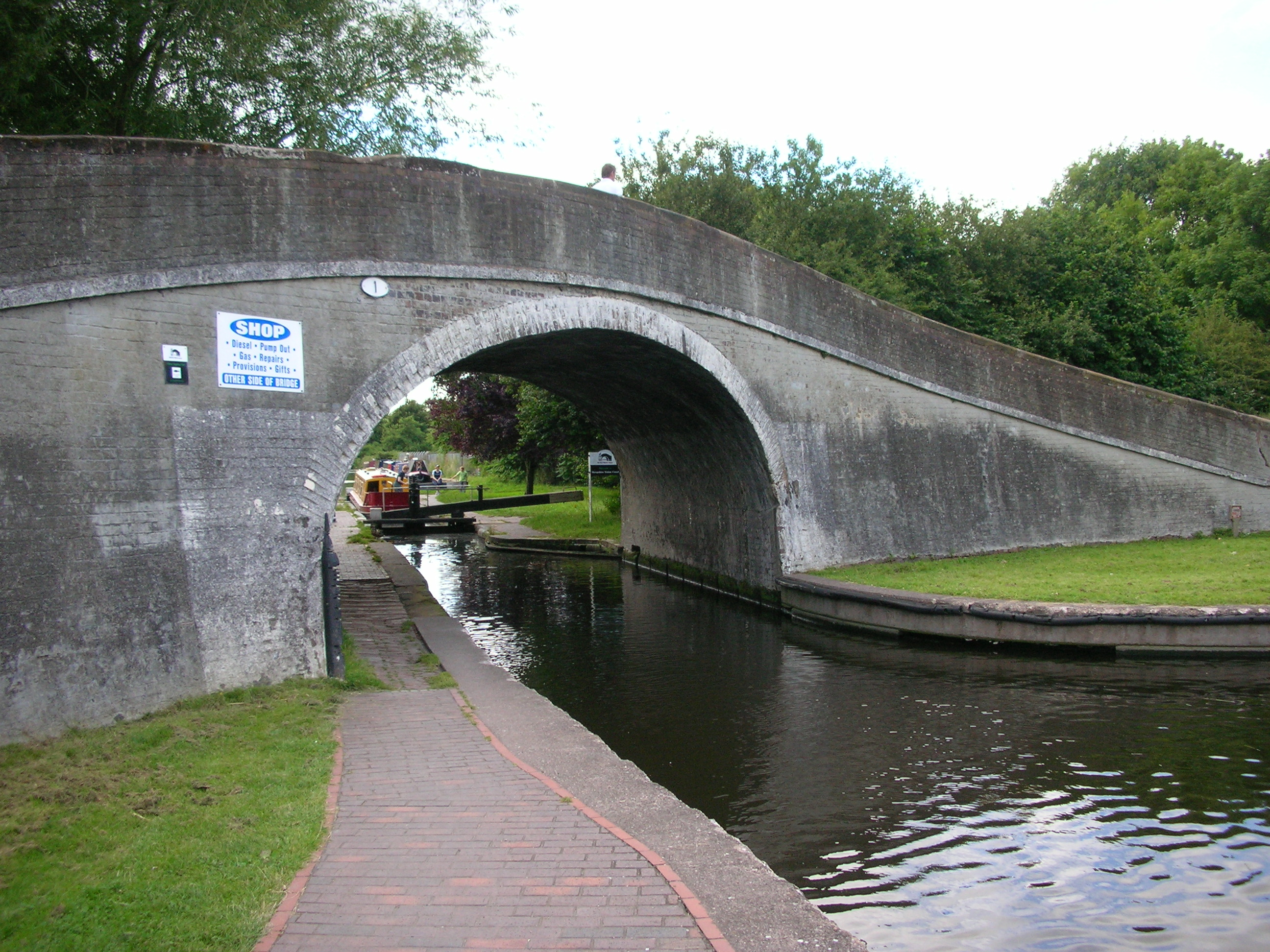
- Autherley Junction. A narrowboat is descending the stop lock.
- Interactive map of Autherley Junction

Specifications
- Status: Open
- Navigation authority: Canal & River Trust

History
- Date completed: 1835

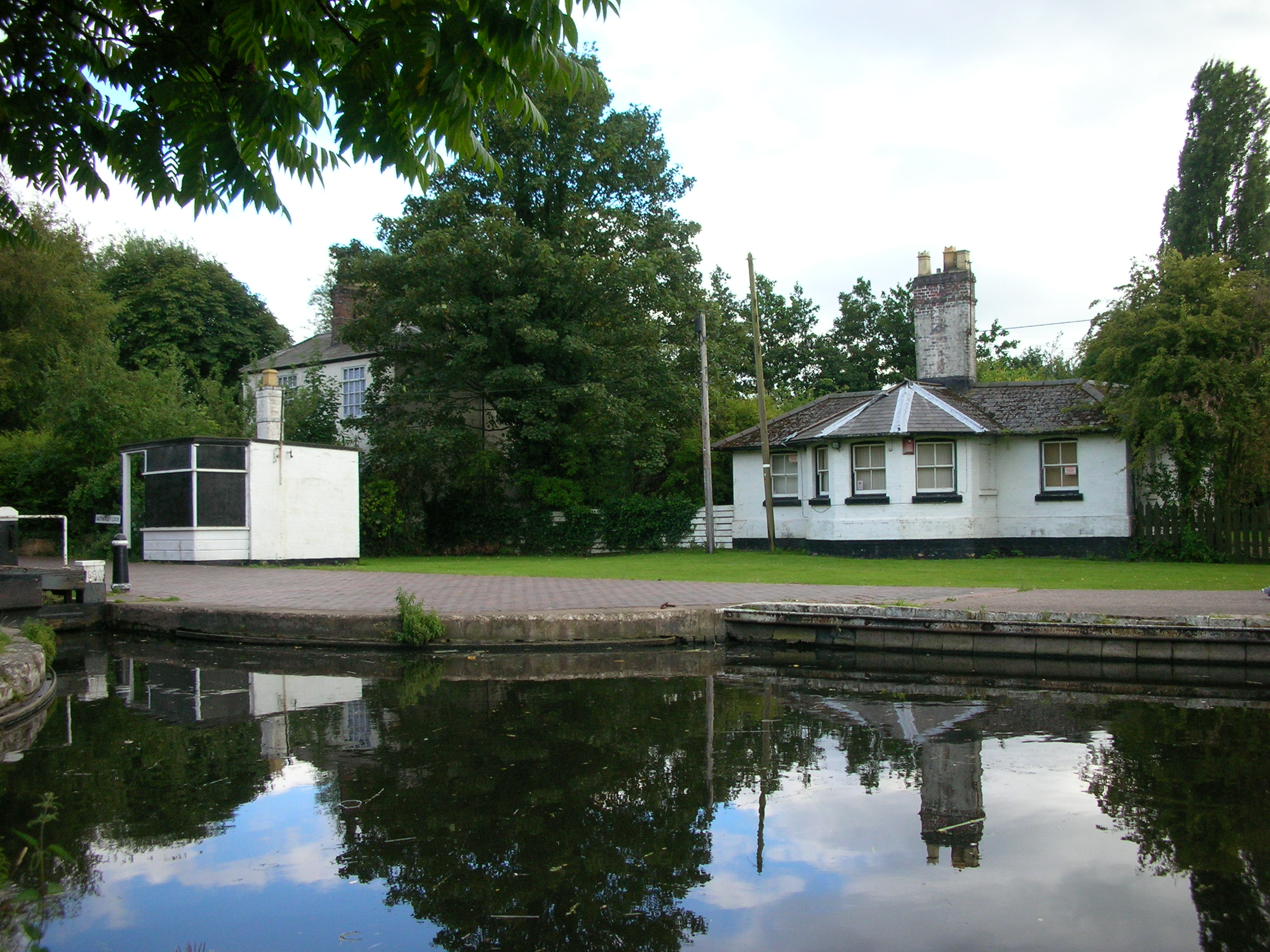
Toll Houses at the stop lock

Autherley Junction (grid reference SJ901020) is the name of the canal junction where the Shropshire Union Canal terminates and meets the Staffordshire and Worcestershire Canal near to Oxley, north Wolverhampton, West Midlands, England. It dates from 1835, when the Birmingham and Liverpool Junction Canal opened, prior to it becoming part of the Shropshire Union network.

It was the subject of hot debate, as the Staffordshire and Worcestershire Canal tried to charge extremely high compensation tolls for the use of the short stretch between the new junction and Aldersley Junction, where the Birmingham Canal Navigations joined it. Proposals to build a bypass around the junction eventually led to the tolls being reduced to economic levels.

== History ==
The Staffordshire and Worcestershire Canal was opened in 1772. It provided a link between the Trent and Mersey Canal at Great Haywood Junction in the north and the River Severn at Stourport in the south. A significant trade soon developed between the Potteries and the south west. 0.5 miles (0.8 km) to the south of the junction site, the canal was joined by the Birmingham Canal Navigations at Aldersley Junction, which provided a route for manufactured goods to pass northwards. In 1835, the Birmingham and Liverpool Junction Canal opened, connecting the Chester Canal at Nantwich to the Staffordshire and Worcestershire at Autherley. It was one of the new generation of canals, which instead of following the contours, used cuttings and embankments to provide a more direct route, and had locks organised into flights where continuing on the level was not possible. Its effect on the Staffordshire and Worcestershire was immediate, with most of the traffic which had previously travelled northwards from Birmingham diverting onto the newer faster route.

Prior to 1835, Aldersley Junction had been known as Aldersley or Autherley Junction, but once the Birmingham and Liverpool Junction Canal opened, Autherley was always used for the junction with the new canal, and Aldersley for the junction with the Birmingham Canal Navigations. The Staffordshire and Worcestershire could now only charge tolls for the short distance between Aldersley and Autherley Junctions, instead of the whole 21 miles (34 km) to Great Haywood. They had foreseen this issue when the new canal was being planned, and the Birmingham and Liverpool Junction Canal Act 1826 (7 Geo. 4. c. xcv), under which it was authorised, had included details of compensation tolls payable to the Staffordshire and Worcestershire Canal. These had been set at 2 shillings per ton on most goods, but prior to the new canal opening, had been reduced to 1 shilling per ton, with manure and lime cheaper still. The tolls allowed the Birmingham and Liverpool Junction Canal to take a lockful of water every time a boat passed between the two canals, although this option was withdrawn when the Staffordshire and Worcestershire became short of water, without reducing the tolls. Instead, the Birmingham and Liverpool Junction Canal bought water from the Wyrley and Essington Canal, which joined the Birmingham Canal Navigations at the top of the flight of 21 locks that descended to Aldersley Junction.

The tolls for the short connecting section were still thought to be absurdly high, and in order to resolve the situation, the Birmingham and Liverpool Junction Canal worked with the Birmingham Canal Company to propose the Tettenhall and Autherley Canal and Aqueduct. This would have left the Birmingham Canal just above lock 19, crossed the Staffordshire and Worcestershire Canal just south of Aldersley Junction by an aqueduct made of iron, and then dropped down through three locks to join the canal above the stop lock. The plans were drawn up by Dugdale Houghton, a firm of surveyors from Birmingham. The bypass would have been just 1 mile (1.6 km) long, and the toll for using it three pence, one quarter of the cost of using the two junctions. The Staffordshire and Worcestershire Canal pointed out that they had halved the compensation toll authorised by the 1826 act, and met with the Birmingham Canal Navigations company in December 1935, but were unhappy with the outcome.

A bill was presented to Parliament in February 1836, and when it was due to receive its second reading in March, the Staffordshire and Worcestershire Canal caved in. A delegation was despatched to London, and terms were agreed, with the compensation toll being reduced to four pence. The bypass canal was never constructed, as the Staffordshire and Worcestershire company reduced their tolls rather than lose them altogether. The Birmingham and Liverpool Junction Canal became part of the Shropshire Union Canal network in 1846. The threat of the bypass was used twice more, in 1842 by the Birmingham and Liverpool Junction Canal to obtain more water, and by the Shropshire Union Canal in 1867 to further reduce the compensation tolls and to obtain a new agreement on water.

== Location ==
Autherley Junction is on the summit level of the Staffordshire and Worcestershire canal, and is around 340 feet (104 m) above sea level. It is also the highest point on the Shropshire Union Canal main line, which descends through 46 locks to Ellesmere Port. A stop lock with a minimal drop of just a few inches was built by the Birmingham and Liverpool Junction Canal just before the junction, to ensure that they did not take large volumes of water from the Staffordshire and Worcestershire to supply their canal. It remains in use, although both canals are now managed by the Canal & River Trust and so theft of water is no longer an issue.

== Bibliography ==
- Cumberlidge, Jane (2009). Inland Waterways of Great Britain (8th Ed.). Imray Laurie Norie and Wilson. ISBN 978-1-84623-010-3.
- Hadfield, Charles (1985). The Canals of the West Midlands. David and Charles. ISBN 978-0-7153-8644-6.
- Nicholson (2006). Nicholson Waterways Guide (Vol 4): Four Counties and the Welsh Canals. Harper Collins. ISBN 0-00-721112-0.

== See also ==
- List of canal junctions in Great Britain
