= Stretton Aqueduct =

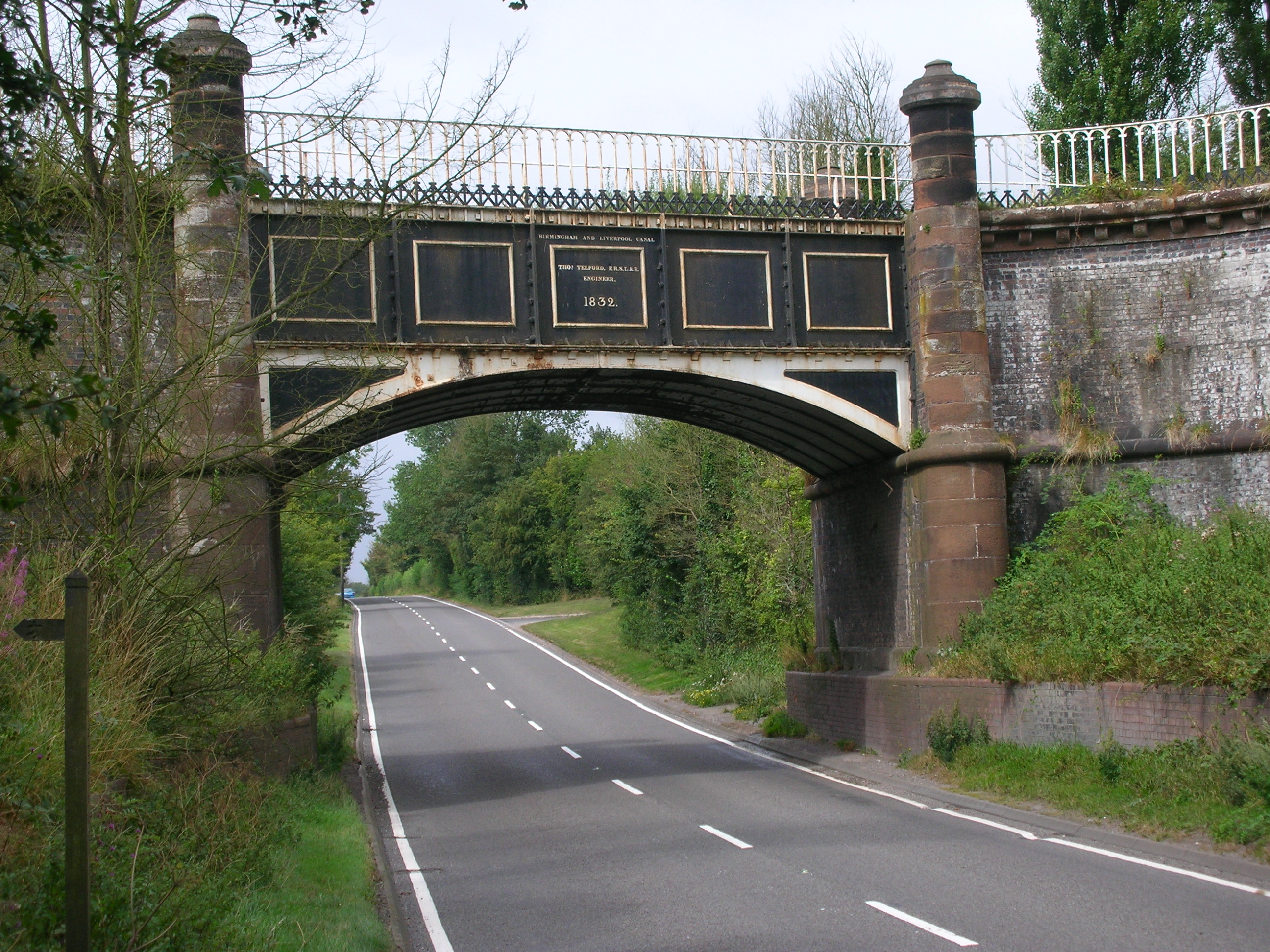
- Stretton Aqueduct carrying the Shropshire Union Canal over the A5. The inscription in the centre panel reads: "Birmingham and Liverpool Canal Thos. Telford F.R.S.L.& E. Engineer 1832"
- Coordinates: 52.694267°N 2.189412°W
- Heritage status: Grade II

Characteristics
- Width: 21 feet (6.4 m)

History
- Construction start: 1832
- Opened: 1835

Location
- Interactive map of Stretton Aqueduct

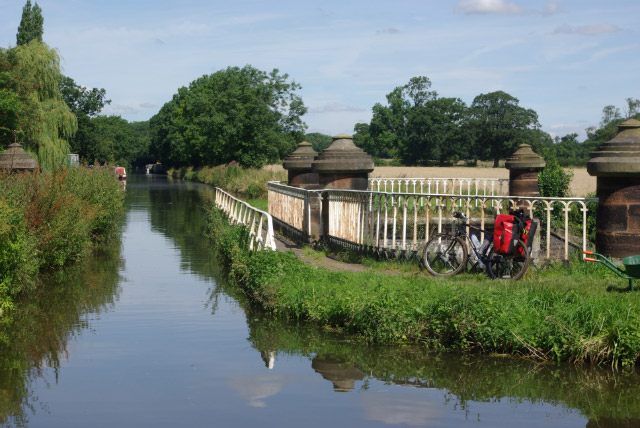
Stretton Aqueduct from the canal

Stretton Aqueduct is a short cast iron canal aqueduct between Stretton and Brewood, and near to Belvide Reservoir, in south Staffordshire, England. Designed by Thomas Telford and bearing his name plus its date of construction, 1832, it carries the Shropshire Union Canal (formerly the Birmingham and Liverpool Junction Canal) 30 feet (9.1 m) over the A5 road at a skewed angle.

The aqueduct has five sections, each 6 feet 6 inches (1.98 m) long, held together by bolts and supported by six cast iron arch ribs, each in two sections and joined at the centre of the arch. It was cast by William Hazledine of Shrewsbury. The trough is 21 feet (6.4 m) wide with an 11 feet (3.4 m) wide channel of water and a towpath on either side. The Staffordshire blue brick abutments have stone dressings.

During 1961–62, the road under the aqueduct was lowered by about 4 feet (1.2 m) to allow taller vehicles to pass underneath.

It was one of Telford's last aqueducts and has been grade II listed since 1985.

== See also ==
- List of canal aqueducts in the United Kingdom
- Nantwich Aqueduct
