= Aldersley Junction =

Canal junction

Coordinates: 52°36′28″N 2°08′42″W

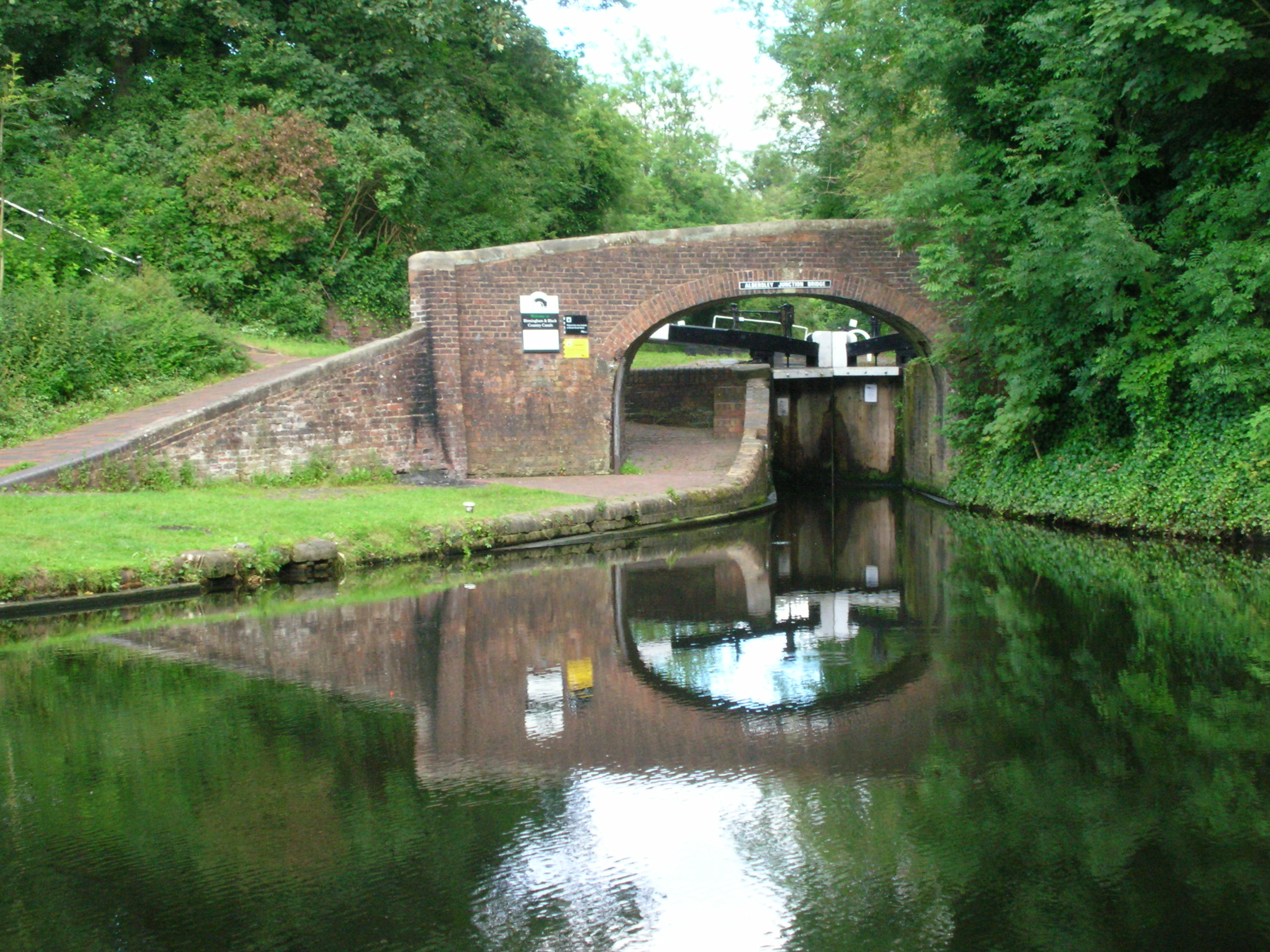
- Aldersley Junction, showing Wolverhampton bottom lock at the end of the BCN Main Line

Specifications
- Status: Open
- Navigation authority: Canal & River Trust

History
- Date completed: 1772

Aldersley Junction (grid reference SJ902011) is the name of the canal junction where the Birmingham Main Line Canal terminates and meets the Staffordshire and Worcestershire Canal near to Oxley, north Wolverhampton, West Midlands, England. It opened in 1772.

== History ==
The Staffordshire and Worcestershire Canal opened in April 1772, connecting Great Haywood Junction on the Trent and Mersey Canal to Stourport on the River Severn. The Birmingham Canal was authorised by an Act of Parliament dated 24 February 1768. It would run from Birmingham to the Staffordshire and Worcestershire main line at Autherley, which was also known as Aldersley at the time. An unusual clause in the Act made provision for the Staffordshire and Worcestershire Canal to build the junction between the two canals themselves, if the Birmingham company failed to complete it within six months of opening their canal. They could also charge the Birmingham company for the full cost of the construction.

The Birmingham company lost no time in opening the route from Birmingham to Wednesbury, where there were collieries, but were less keen in the opinion of the Staffordshire and Worcestershire, to complete the link to their canal. Work began on the link in early 1770, but in May the Staffordshire and Worcestershire attempted to obtain a mandamus writ, which would have compelled the other company to make the junction. They failed to get one, and so in January 1771 they presented a bill to Parliament to authorise them to make the junction. At this point, the Birmingham company negotiated, paid the costs of the bill, and agreed to press on quickly with the link. It was no small task, as it involved a flight of 20 locks (later increased to 21) to drop the level of the canal 132 feet (40 m) between Wolverhampton and the junction. The junction opened for traffic on 21 September 1772, some five months after the Staffordshire and Worcestershire had opened.

The names Autherley and Aldersley continued to be used interchangeably until the Birmingham and Liverpool Junction Canal opened their canal to join the Chester Canal to a new junction around 0.5 miles (0.8 km) further to the north. At this point, Autherley was applied to the northern junction and Aldersley to the southern junction. Prior to the opening of the new canal, there had been considerable trade on the Staffordshire and Worcestershire Canal between the Potteries and the south-western cities of Gloucester and Bristol, and also trade in manufactured goods north from Birmingham. The Birmingham and Liverpool Junction Canal, however, was one of the new generation of canals, which rather than winding across the countryside following the contours, used embankments and cuttings to create a more direct route, and tended to group the locks into flights. It was therefore shorter and quicker, with the result that much of the trade which had formerly travelled the 21 miles (34 km) from Aldersley to Great Haywood Junction now travelled the short distance between Aldersley and Autherley. The Staffordshire and Worcestershire raised the tolls for this stretch to absurd levels, in an attempt to reduce their losses.

In order to resolve the situation, the Birmingham Canal company worked with the Liverpool Junction company, and proposed the Tettenhall and Autherley Canal and Aqueduct. This would have left the Birmingham Canal just above lock 19, crossed the Staffordshire and Worcestershire Canal just below Aldersley Junction by an aqueduct made of iron, and then dropped down through three locks to join the Liverpool Junction Canal above the stop lock. The plans were drawn up by Dugdale Houghton, a firm of surveyors from Birmingham, but the canal was never constructed, as the Staffordshire and Worcestershire company reduced their tolls rather than lose them altogether.

== Location ==
Aldersley Junction is on the summit level of the Staffordshire and Worcestershire Canal, which is at a height of around 340 feet (100 m) above sea level. The pound continues for 8.1 miles (13.0 km) to the north before reaching Gailey Lock, the first one that starts the descent to Great Haywood Junction. To the south, Compton Lock is 1.8 miles (2.9 km) away, and starts the descent to Stourbridge. The Birmingham and Liverpool Junction Canal became part of the Shropshire Union Canal network in 1846. There is a stop lock just after Autherley Junction, which drops the level by just a few inches, and then a level pound of 7.8 miles (12.6 km) before the first real lock at Wheaton Aston. The Birmingham Canal became part of the Birmingham Canal Navigations, and the first of 21 locks which raise the canal 132 feet (40 m) up to the 473-foot (144 m) level is located immediately after the junction.

== See also ==
- List of canal junctions in Great Britain

== Bibliography ==
- Cumberlidge, Jane (2009). Inland Waterways of Great Britain (8th Ed.). Imray Laurie Norie and Wilson. ISBN 978-1-84623-010-3.
- Hadfield, Charles (1985). The Canals of the West Midlands. David and Charles. ISBN 0-7153-8644-1.
- Nicholson (2003). Nicholson Waterways Guide (Vol 3): Birmingham and the heart of England. Harper Collins. ISBN 0-00-713666-8.
- Canal Companion - Birmingham Canal Navigations. J. M. Pearson & Associates. 1989. ISBN 0-907864-49-X.
