= Belvide Reservoir =

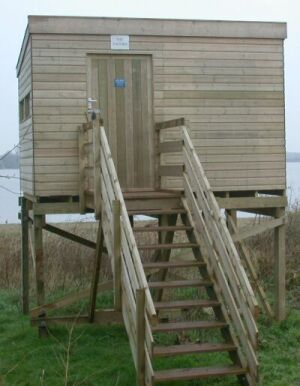
- The 'Gazebo' hide at the West Midland Bird Club's Belvide Reservoir reserve

- Location within Staffordshire
- Location: South Staffordshire
- Coordinates: 52.686°N 2.193°W
- Type: Canal reservoir
- Basin countries: United Kingdom
- Managing agency: British Waterways
- Designation: SSSI
- Built: 1833
- Surface area: 737,000 square metres (182 acres)
- Water volume: 2,196,000 cubic metres (483×10^{6} imp gal)
- Website: www.westmidlandbirdclub.org.uk/belvide-reserve

Belvide Reservoir is a reservoir in South Staffordshire, England. It was built in 1833 to supply the Birmingham and Liverpool Junction Canal, and has been managed as a nature reserve since 1977. It has been used to study the effect of water level changes on bird populations.

== Details ==
Owned by the Canal & River Trust, the reservoir was constructed around 1833 to feed the Birmingham and Liverpool Junction Canal, which became part of the Shropshire Union Canal in 1846. Work began on it in 1832, and the canal opened in early 1835. Traffic levels were high, and the company had to buy 2,000 lockfulls of water in the first year, for which they paid £800 to the Wyrley and Essington Canal. In 1836, there was still pressure on the water supply, and the engineer William Cubitt was instructed to enlarge the reservoir in May. In order to finance the improvements, the Commissioners agreed that they would not be paid until £20,000 had been spent on the improvements. The enlarged reservoir was completed in 1842. The valve gear which controls the flow of water from the reservoir to the canal is believed to be original. It is housed in a circular gear house which stands in front of a concave brick retaining wall. Both were designed by Thomas Telford, and are Grade II* listed structures. The structure has a cast iron dome, and is a rare example of an original valve house. The reservoir covers an area of 180 acres (73 ha) when water levels are at their highest, but levels fluctuate as water is used for the canal, and the surface area is around half of this figure when the water level is 12 feet (3.7 m) lower. The reservoir is fed by a tributary of the River Penk.

It is the site of a nature reserve, which has been operated by the West Midland Bird Club since January 1977, and is designated a Site of Special Scientific Interest (SSSI). The reserve is not open to the general public, and a permit is required to visit it.

The site has attracted interest from bird-watchers since the 1920s, when the ornithologist Arnold Boyd began visiting it and publishing reports in the magazine British Birds, although he did not reveal its location, as he called it "Bellfields" in the articles. The reservoir has been visited by many scarce and rare migrant birds, including white-winged black tern (1970, 1974, 1992, 1999), whiskered tern (1969), Caspian tern (1968, 1992), spotted crake and spotted sandpiper (1982).

Studies of the effects of changes in the water level at the reservoir have resulted in the publishing of an ideal regime for such draw-downs to maximise the benefits to wildlife. As with many such studies, there are conflicting interests, since moulting ducks such as pochard, shoveller and tufted duck thrive in summers when the levels do not fluctuate much, whereas the larger draw-downs create better conditions for wading birds. The shallows are rejuvenated when a large draw-down occurs, and dabbling ducks such as teal are most numerous as the reservoir refills, while the population of diving ducks is at its largest a year after such a draw-down has occurred.

The reservoir is located immediately to the south of the A5 road, which follows the course of the Roman Watling Street at this point. The canal is a little to the east, and crosses the road at Stretton Aqueduct. Surplus water from the reservoir flows under the canal to reach the River Penk, a little further to the east. The nearest village is Brewood, about 1 mile (1.6 km) to the south-east.

== See also ==
- Canals of the United Kingdom
- History of the British canal system

== Bibliography ==
- Hadfield, Charles (1985). The Canals of the West Midlands. David and Charles. ISBN 0-7153-8644-1.
- Merritt, Anthony (1994). Wetlands, Industry & Wildlife - a manual of principles and practices. The Wildfowl & Wetlands Trust. ISBN 0-900806-18-4.
