= Staffordshire and Worcestershire Canal =

Canal in the West Midlands, England

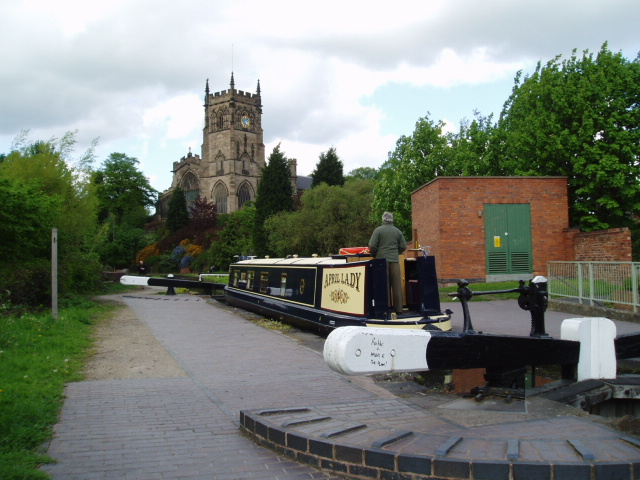
- Kidderminster Lock on the Staffordshire and Worcestershire Canal
- Interactive map of Staffordshire and Worcestershire Canal

Specifications
- Length: 46 miles (74 km)
- Maximum boat length: 70 ft 0 in (21.34 m)
- Maximum boat beam: 7 ft 0 in (2.13 m)
- Locks: 43
- Navigation authority: Canal and River Trust

History
- Principal engineer: James Brindley
- Date of act: 14 May 1766
- Date of first use: 1772
- Date completed: 1771

Geography
- Start point: River Severn
- End point: Trent and Mersey Canal

The Staffordshire and Worcestershire Canal is a navigable narrow canal in Staffordshire and Worcestershire in the Midlands of England. It is 46 miles (74 km) long, linking the River Severn at Stourport in Worcestershire with the Trent and Mersey Canal at Haywood Junction by Great Haywood.

== History ==
=== Creation ===
James Brindley was the chief engineer of the canal, which was part of his "Grand Cross" plan for waterways connecting the major ports at Hull (via the Trent), Liverpool (via the Mersey), Bristol (via the Severn) and London (via the Thames).

Severn and Trent Canal Act 1766
- Act of Parliament
- Parliament of Great Britain
- Long title: An Act for making and maintaining a Navigable Cut, or Canal, from the River Severn, between Bewdley and Titton Brook in the County of Worcester, to cross the River Trent, at or near Heywood Mill in the County of Stafford, and to communicate with a Canal intended to be made between the said River Trent and the River Mersey.
- Citation: 6 Geo. 3. c. 97
- Territorial extent: Great Britain

Dates
- Royal assent: 14 May 1766
- Commencement: 17 December 1765 (Note: Start of session.)
Other legislation
| Amended by | Severn and Trent Canal Act 1770; Severn Navigation Act 1843; Staffordshire and Worcestershire Canal Act 1933 |

Status: Amended

Text of statute as originally enacted

The act of Parliament authorising the canal, the Severn and Trent Canal Act 1766 (6 Geo. 3. c. 97), was passed on 14 May 1766. This created "The Company of Proprietors of the Staffordshire and Worcestershire Canal Navigation", which was empowered to raise an initial £70,000 (equivalent to £10,530,000 in 2025),, with a further £30,000 (equivalent to £4,510,000 in 2025), if needed, to fund the canal's construction.

The canal was completed in 1771 for a cost that exceeded the authorised capital, and opened to trade in 1772. It was a commercial success, with trade from the Staffordshire Potteries southwards to Gloucester and Bristol, and trade from the Black Country northwards to the Potteries via the junction with the Birmingham Canal at Aldersley.

=== Development ===
Severn Navigation Act 1790
- Act of Parliament
- Parliament of Great Britain
- Long title: An Act to enable the Company of Proprietors of the Staffordshire and Worcestershire Navigation to improve the Navigation of the River Severn from Stourport, in the County of Worcester, to a Place called Diglis, near the City of Worcester.
- Citation: 30 Geo. 3. c. 75
- Territorial extent: Great Britain

Dates
- Royal assent: 9 June 1790
- Commencement: 21 January 1790 (Note: Start of session.)
Other legislation
| Amended by | Staffordshire and Worcestershire Canal Act 1933 |

Status: Amended

Text of statute as originally enacted

The company obtained a second act of Parliament, the Severn Navigation Act 1790 (30 Geo. 3. c. 75), on 9 June 1790, authorising it to raise another £12,000 (equivalent to £1,560,000 in 2025), to improve the River Severn immediately below Stourport as far as Diglis, to improve navigation to and from the canal. At Stourport there were four basins, linked by broad locks, that allowed broad-beamed Severn trows to enter them from the river. Goods could then be trans-shipped from the canal narrow boats to the trows for onward shipment to Bristol.

=== Competition ===
Trade declined when the newer Worcester and Birmingham Canal was opened in 1815, providing a more direct route between Birmingham and Bristol. To remain competitive, the company increased the hours when locks could be used, and by 1830 they were available 24 hours a day. Another setback occurred when the Birmingham and Liverpool Junction Canal opened its new route to Chester and Merseyside, meeting the canal at Autherley Junction. This took much of the traffic from the section to Great Haywood. Faced with a high volume of trade using the 1/2-mile (800 m) stretch between Aldersley and Autherley Junctions, the company levied very high tolls.

In order to resolve the situation the Birmingham Canal Company and the Birmingham and Liverpool Junction Company jointly promoted a bill in Parliament in February 1836, which would have authorised a short canal – the Tettenhall and Autherley Canal and Aqueduct – that would have left the Birmingham Canal at a higher level than the junction, crossed the Staffordshire and Worcestershire by an aqueduct, and then dropped down by a series of locks to join the Birmingham and Liverpool Junction Canal north of Autherley junction. The canal company decided to reduce its tolls rather than lose the trade altogether, and the bill was withdrawn. Further concessions were obtained by the other two canal companies by threats to resurrect the plans on two subsequent occasions.

=== Decline ===
Despite the competition, and later competition from the railways, the canal company paid dividends to its shareholders until nationalisation, although profits fell steadily from the 1860s. It remained independent until the Transport Act 1947 nationalised Britain's canals on 1 January 1948. In its latter years the major trade was in coal from Cannock to a power station at Stourport. The power station closed in 1949, and after that, the only commercial traffic was on the stretch between Autherley and Aldersley Junctions.

=== Restoration ===
In 1959 the British Transport Commission planned to close the canal but it was saved by a volunteer group, the Staffordshire and Worcestershire Canal Society. In 1968 the canal was reclassified as a cruiseway, and the following year all of it was declared a conservation area. This has resulted in historical buildings and structures being retained and improved sympathetically.

== Course ==
=== A strategic link ===
The Staffordshire and Worcestershire Canal links two of southern Britain's largest river catchments:

- The Trent catchment, which drains most of the north and east of the English Midlands, as well as parts of the West Midlands, and flows ultimately into the North Sea via the Humber Estuary,
- The Severn catchment, which drains a large area of north and central Wales, as well as much of the West Midlands, and drains ultimately into the Celtic Sea via the Bristol Channel.

The canal was a major north–south route for the west of England, linking other canals to create a network running:

- via the Trent and Mersey Canal, to Stoke-on-Trent, to the northwest of England (Lancashire and Cheshire) and to the East Midlands,
- via the BCN Main Line and the Stourbridge Canal to the Black Country and Birmingham,
- via the Shropshire Union Canal to Chester and north Wales.

The canal essentially follows river valleys, shadowing the course of tributaries, to break through the watershed between the Trent and Severn north-west of Wolverhampton, at the Aldersley Gap, a minor glacial feature turned to advantage by Brindley.

=== Within the Trent catchment ===
The northern starting point of the canal at Great Haywood, its junction with the Trent and Mersey Canal, is only about 330 yards (300 m) from the confluence of the River Sow with the Trent. The canal runs west through Tixall Wide and along the Sow valley, closely following the river, to Weeping Cross, on the south east edge of Stafford, the confluence of the River Penk with the Sow. The canal then swings at right angles to the south, taking up the course of the Penk.

It then runs via Acton Trussell and Penkridge to Calf Heath, where it is joined by the now-derelict Hatherton Canal. Continuing south via Coven, it begins to bear away from the Penk, which has its source at Perton, well to the west of the canal. The canal enters north-west Wolverhampton. Here it is joined, in rapid succession, by the Shropshire Union Canal at Autherley Junction and the BCN Main Line at Aldersley Junction.

=== Within the Severn catchment ===
South of Aldersley, the canal begins to shadow the River Smestow, part of the Severn catchment. The Smestow actually crosses the canal via the Dunstall Water Bridge, a small aqueduct planned by Brindley to preserve the flow of the river, before dropping into the valley and running alongside it. Skirting Wolverhampton between the steep hillsides of Compton and Tettenhall, through the Smestow Valley Local Nature Reserve, the canal reaches Wightwick. Here it bears south, cutting across a wide bend in the course of the Smestow. Descending sharply through the impressive Bratch locks, the canal rejoins the River Smestow just south of Wombourne. From here it follows the river very closely to its confluence with the Stour near Prestwood.

The confluence of Smestow and Stour is paralleled closely by the junction of the Staffordshire and Worcestershire with the Stourbridge Canal, which descends through the Stour valley to Stourton. Southward from this point, the canal is cut through very steep sandstone banks and passes through a tunnel at Dunsley all the way closely following the river while slicing across its many meanders. Running through Kinver, Caunsall, Cookley and Wolverley, it serves a series of wharves in the old industrial town of Kidderminster. Finally it reaches its end in a complex of wharves and basins in the canal town of Stourport-on-Severn, where it descends steeply to the river through two sets of locks.

== Map ==
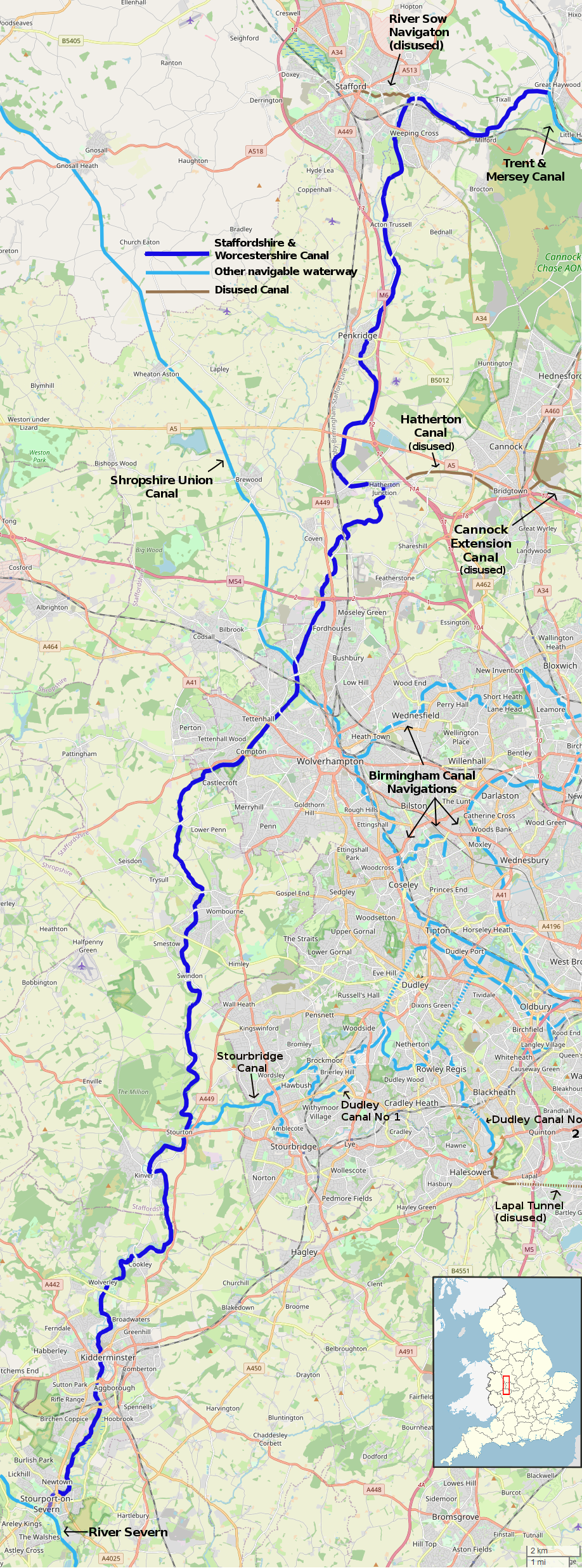
Map of the canal and connecting waterways (zoom in for detail)

== Gallery ==
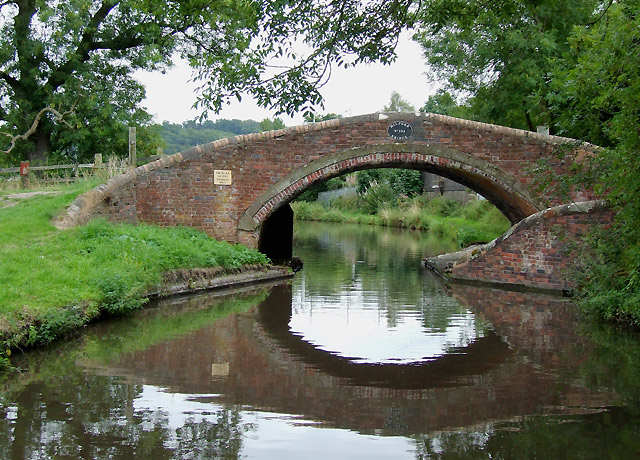
Bridge 105: a changeline bridge near Milford.

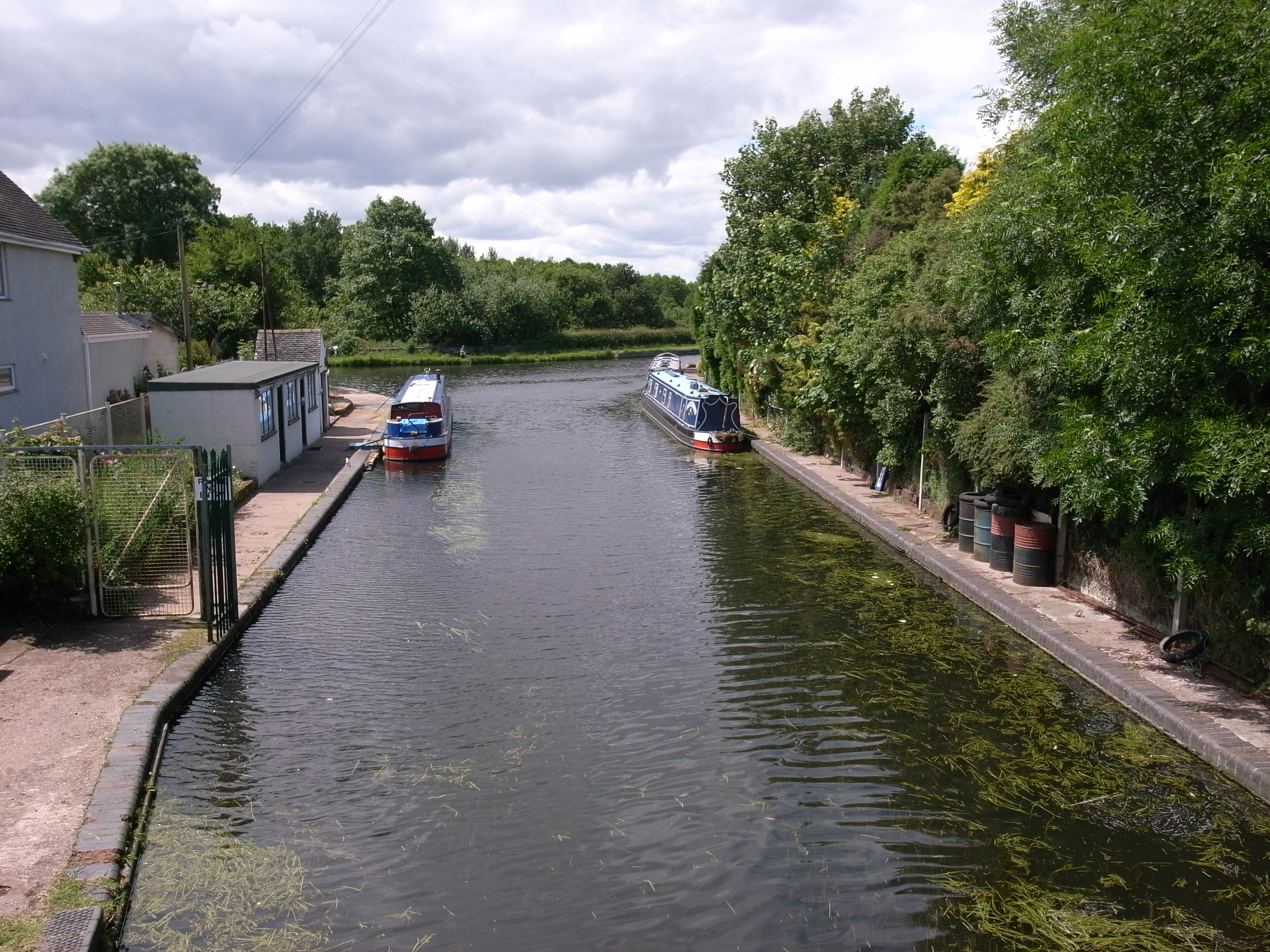
Hatherton Junction, the meeting of the Hatherton Canal (behind camera) and the Staffordshire and Worcestershire Canal (left and right) at Calf Heath, Staffordshire.

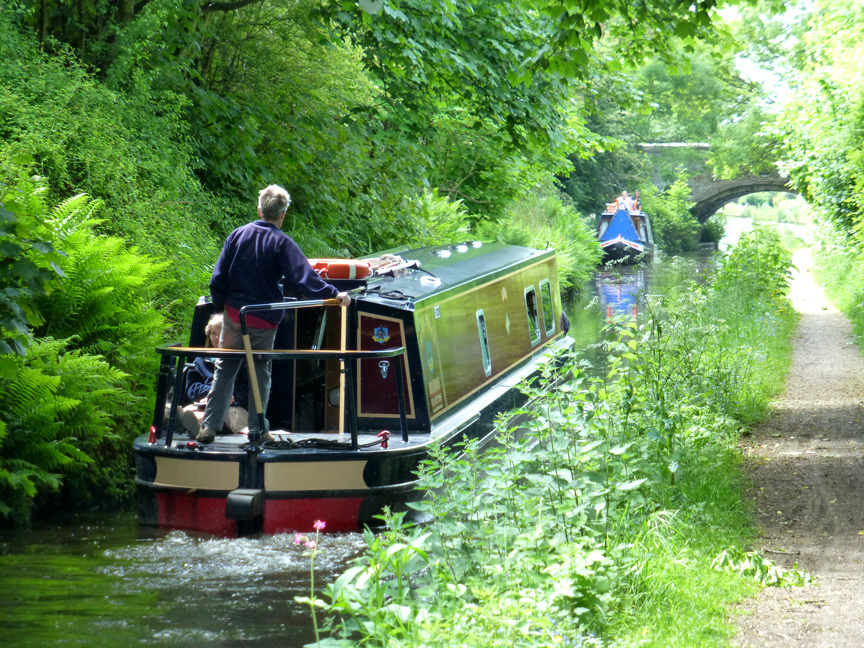
Pendeford Rockin' or 'The Narrows', here the canal is a narrow cutting through an outcrop of Keuper Sandstone either side of the Forster Bridge at Pendeford.

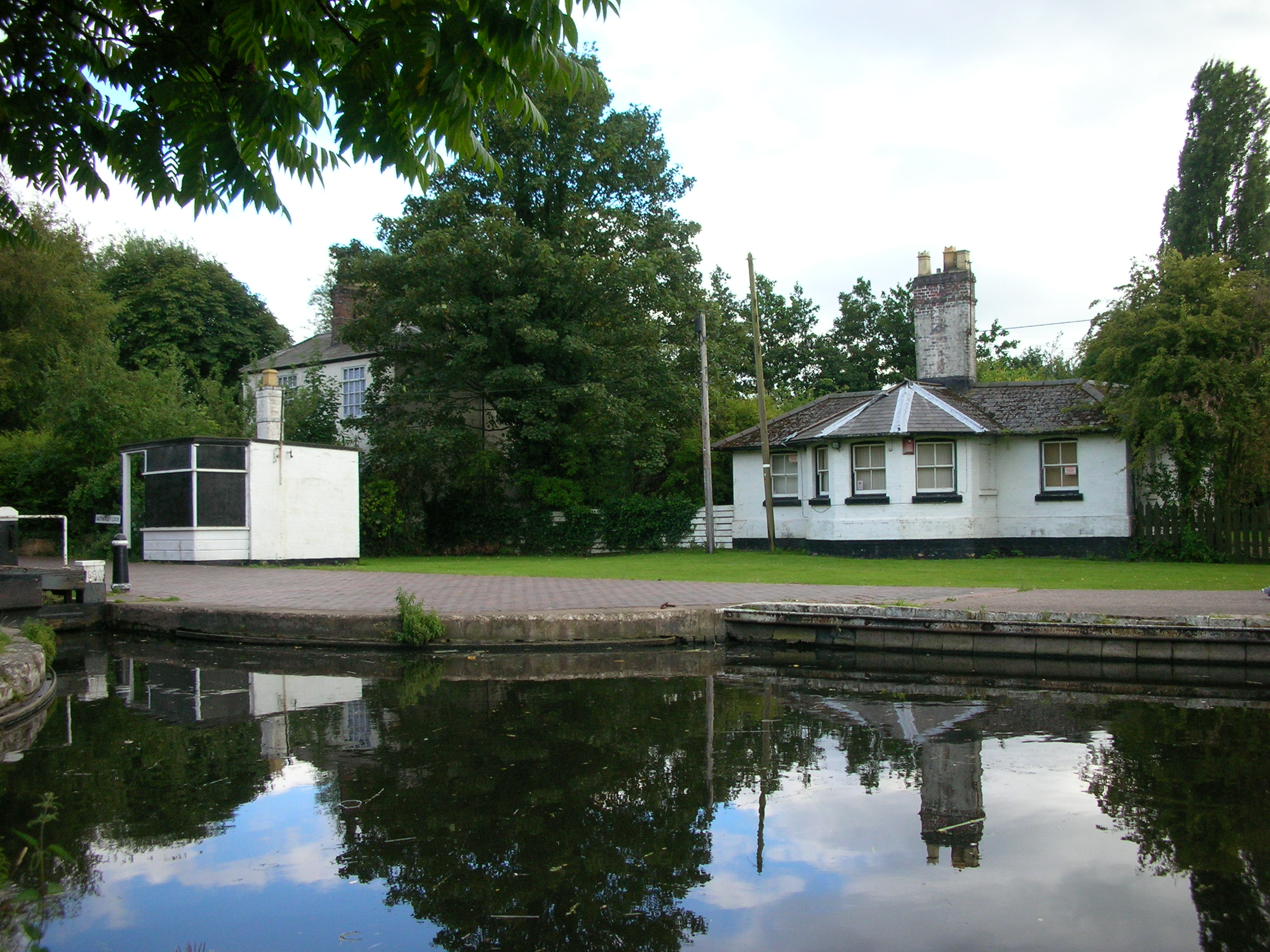
Toll houses at Autherley Junction, where the Shropshire Union Canal terminates and meets the canal.

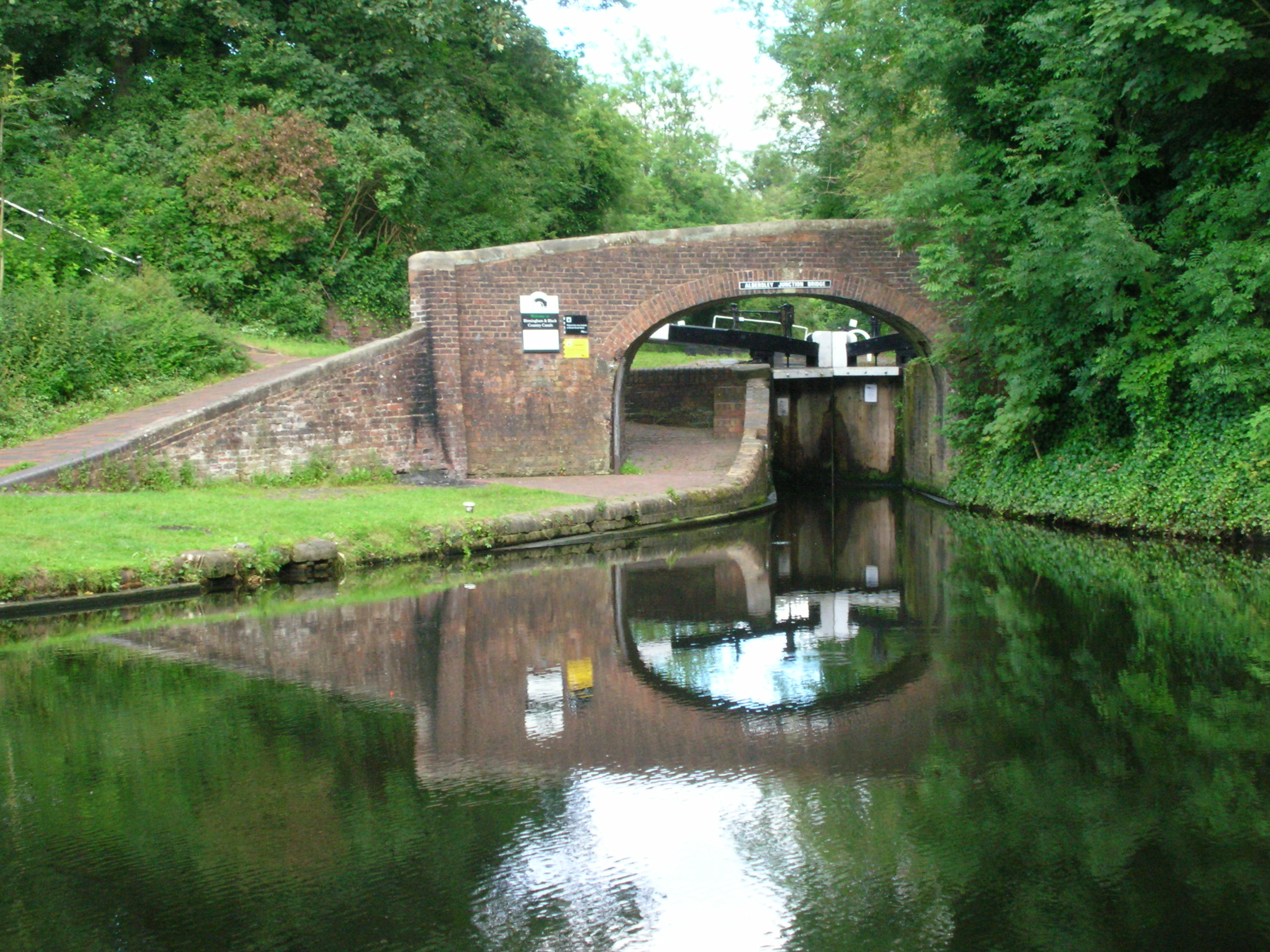
Aldersley Junction: the bottom lock of the Wolverhampton flight of the BCN Main Line is visible through the roving bridge

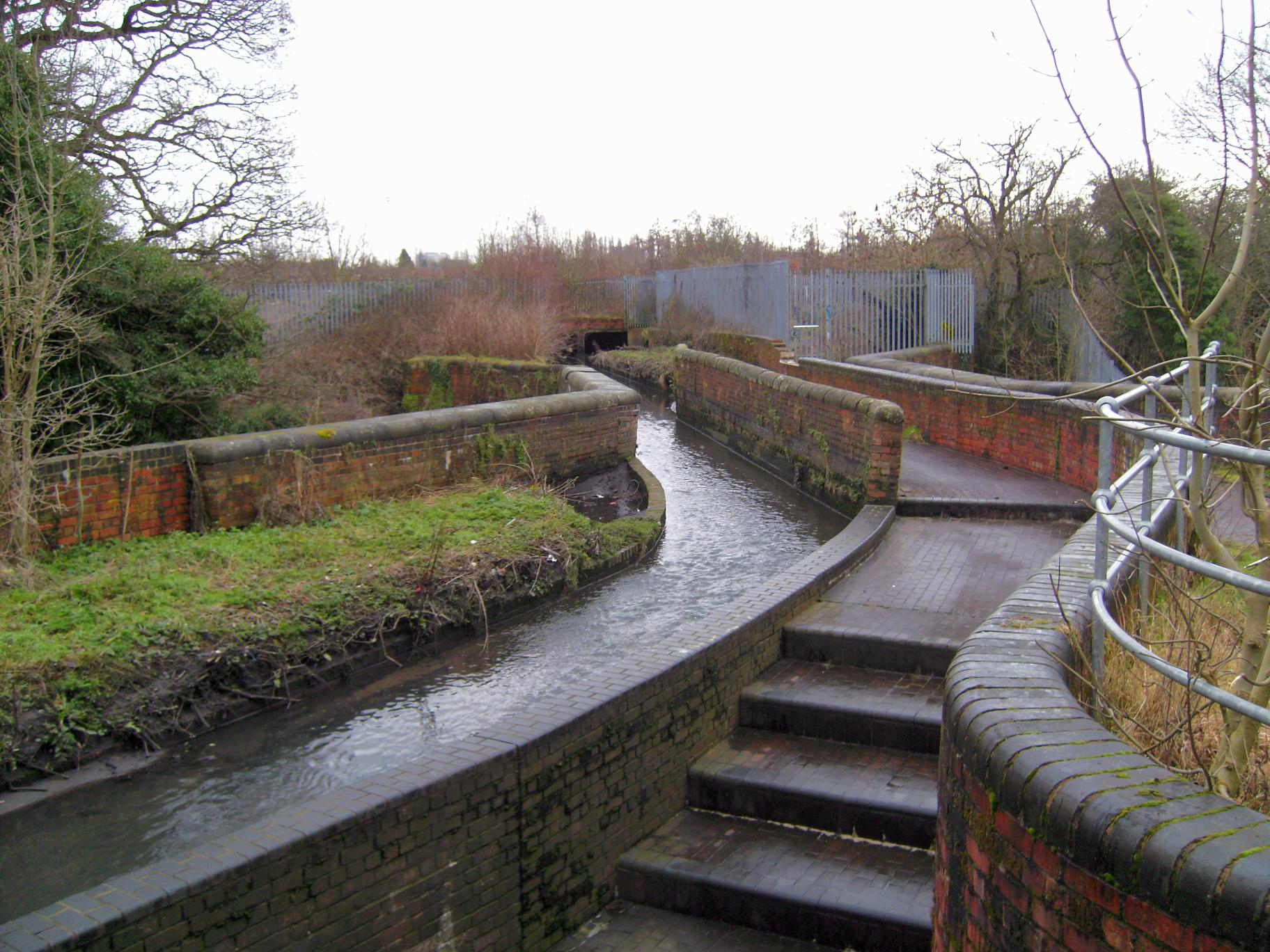
The Dunstall Water Bridge carries the Smestow Brook over the canal.

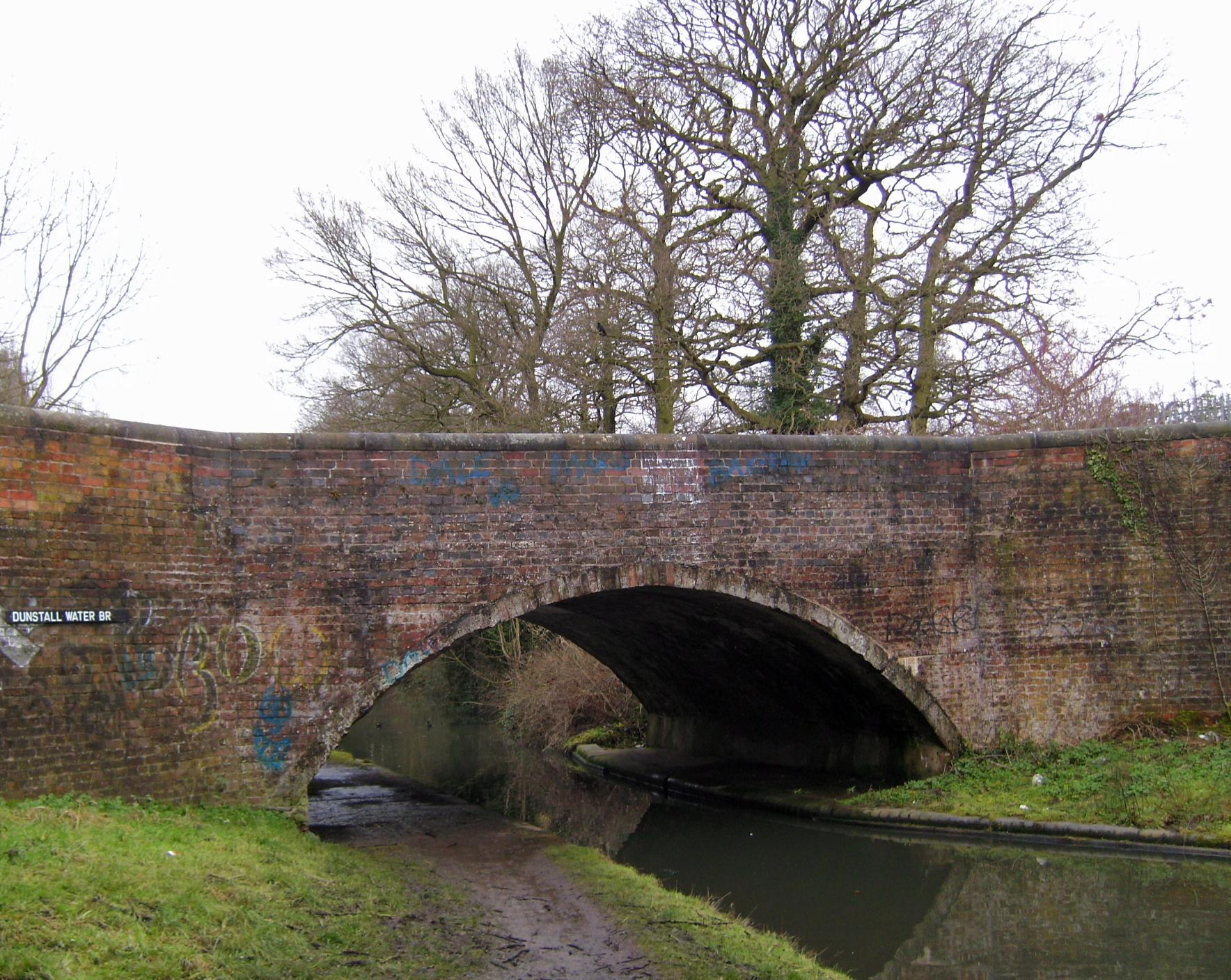
The Dunstall water Bridge viewed from the canal side.

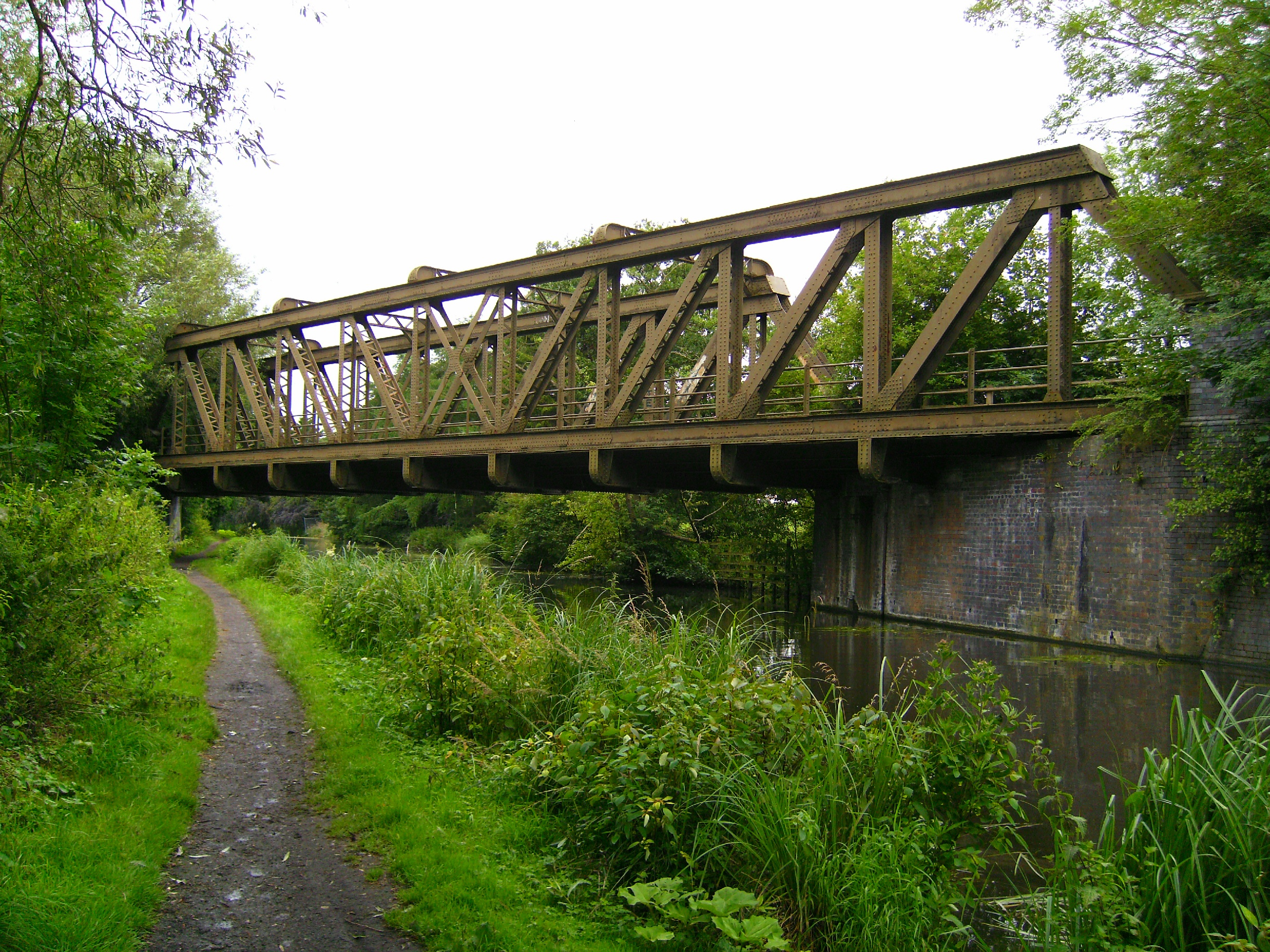
The "Meccano Bridge", a steel truss structure carrying the Wolverhampton Railway Walk (the former Wombourne Branch Line) over the canal in Smestow Valley Local Nature Reserve, Wolverhampton.

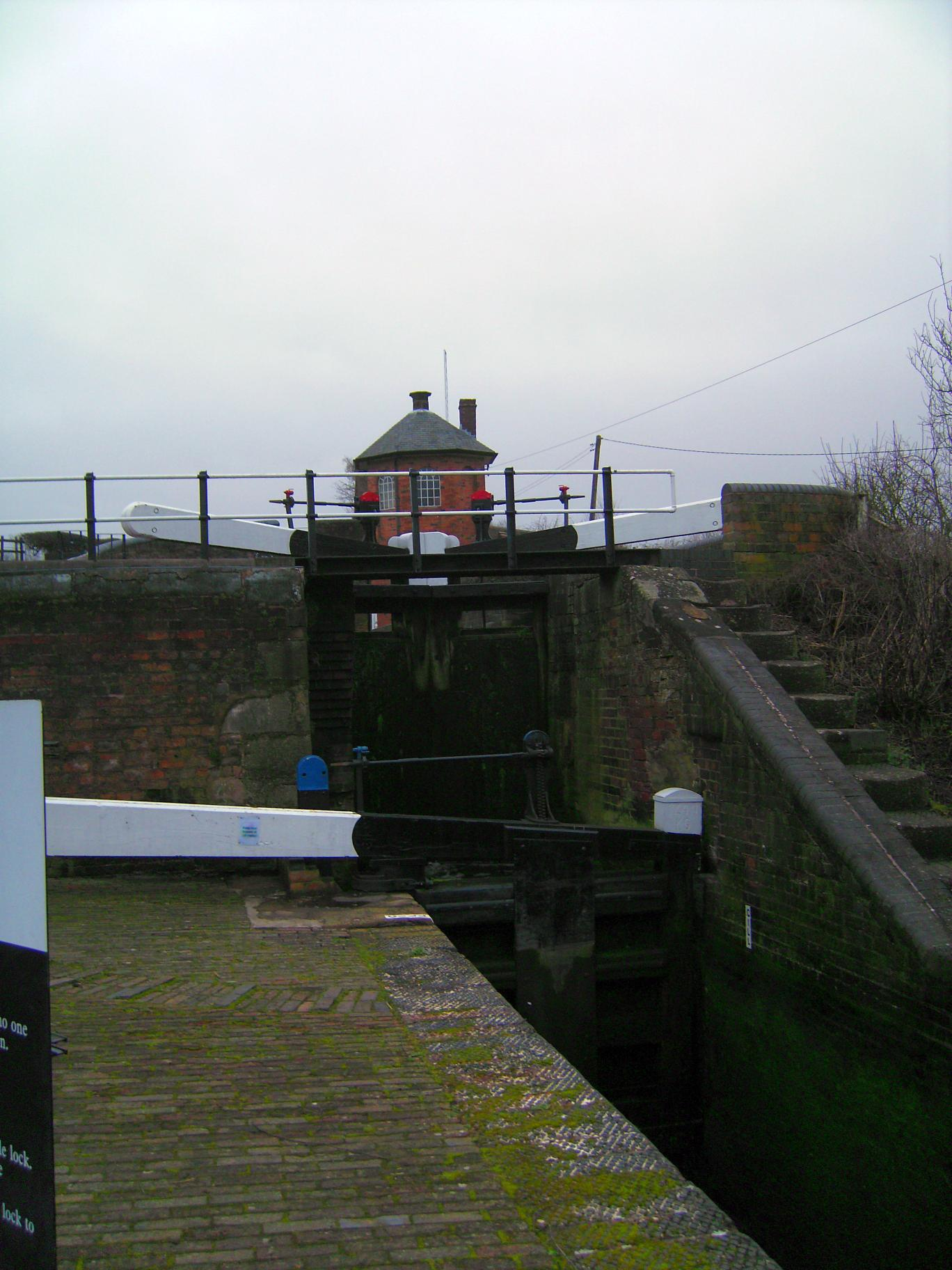
Part of the Bratch Locks at Wombourne.

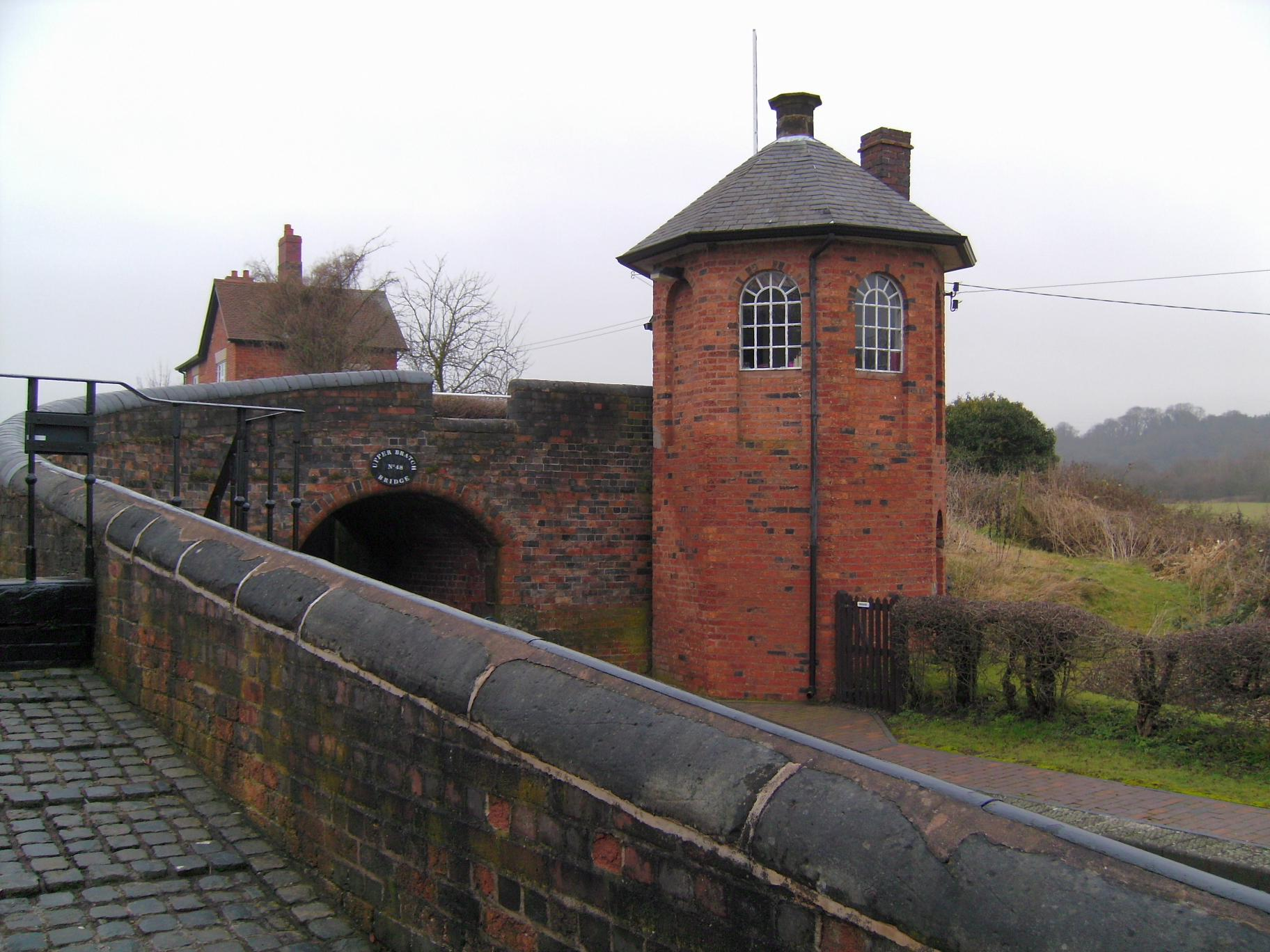
Toll House and upper bridge at the Bratch Locks.

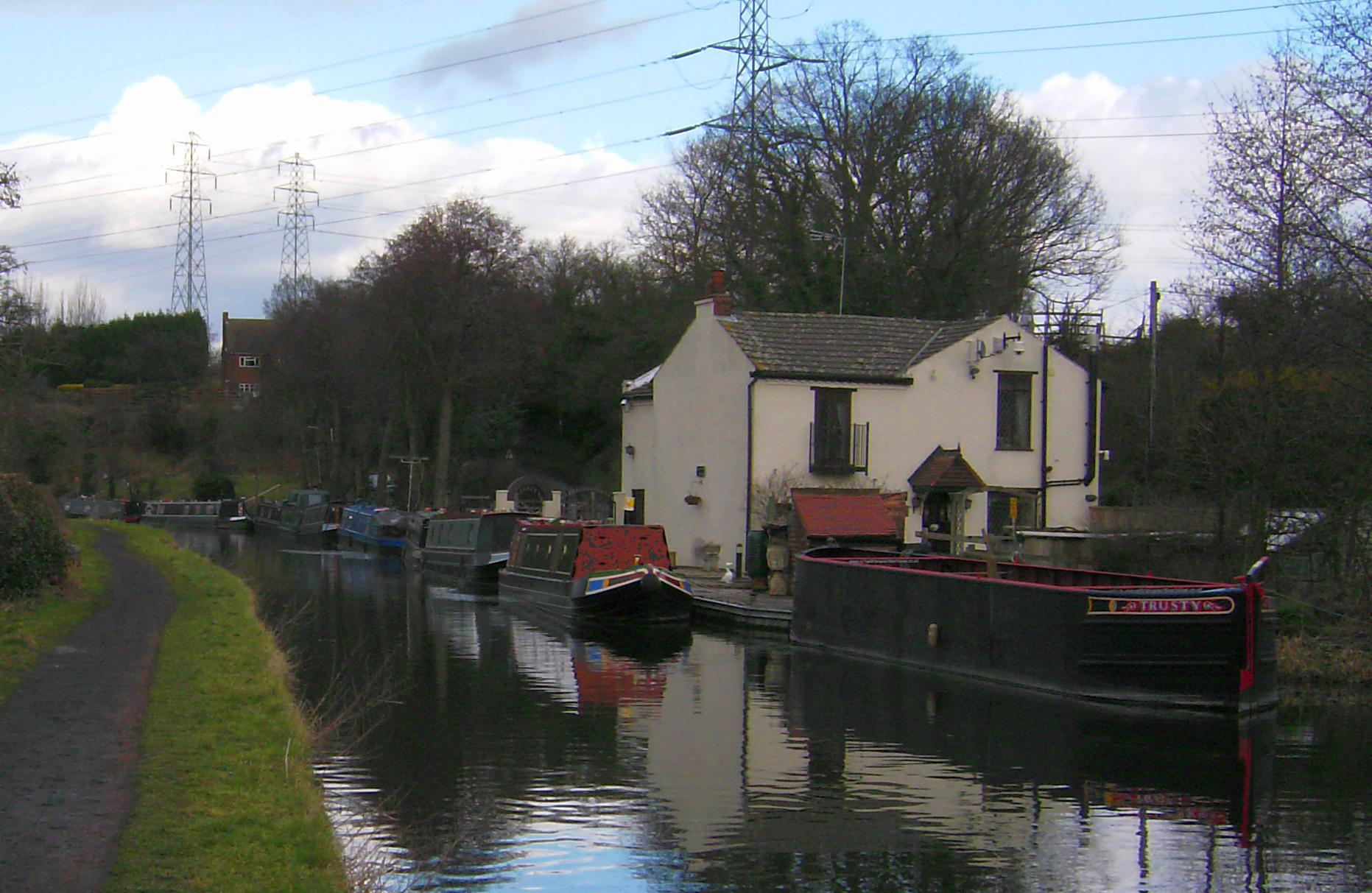
Hinksford Wharf, one of several important mooring places on this section of the canal.

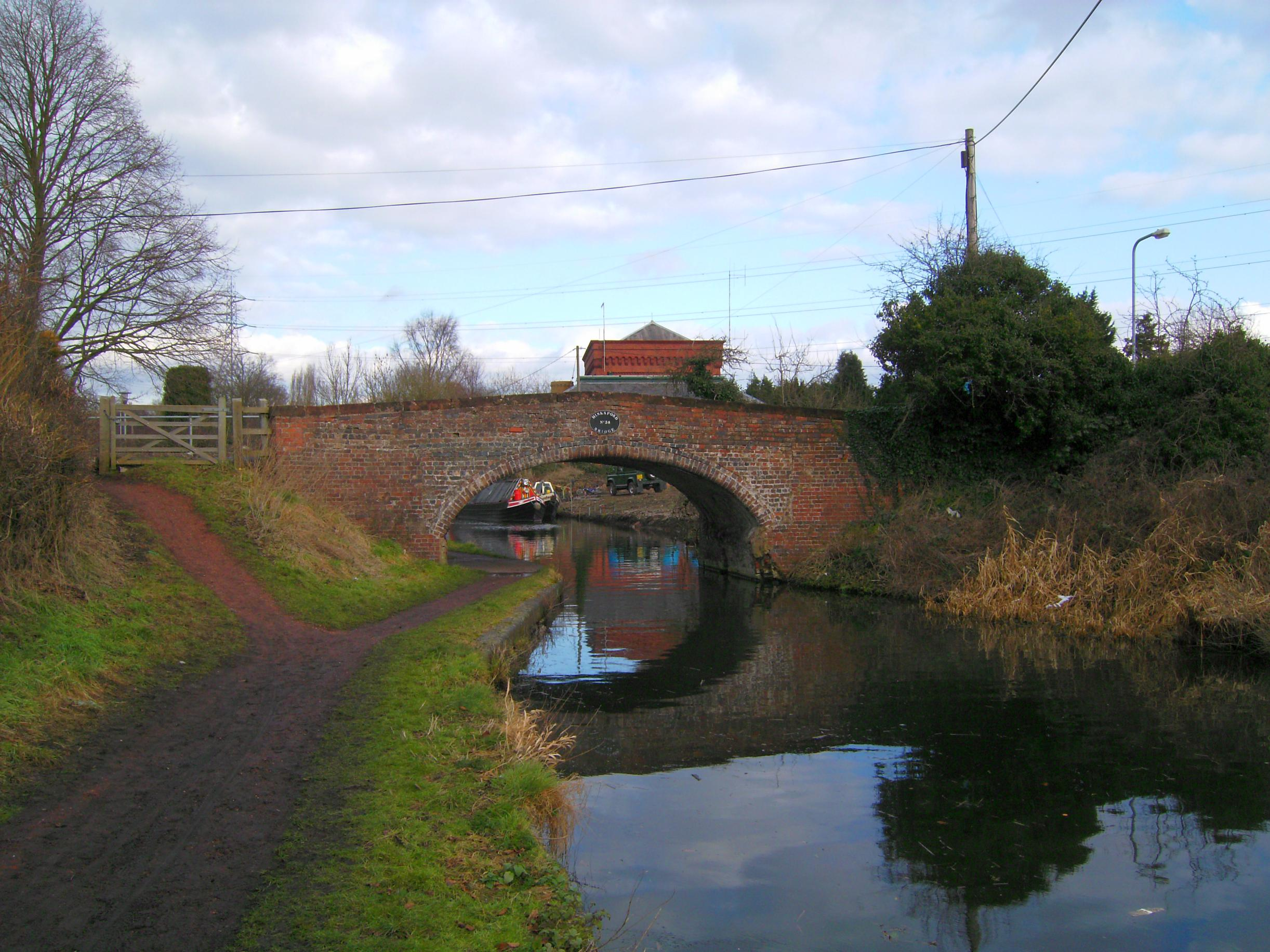
Bridge and pumping station at Hinksford.

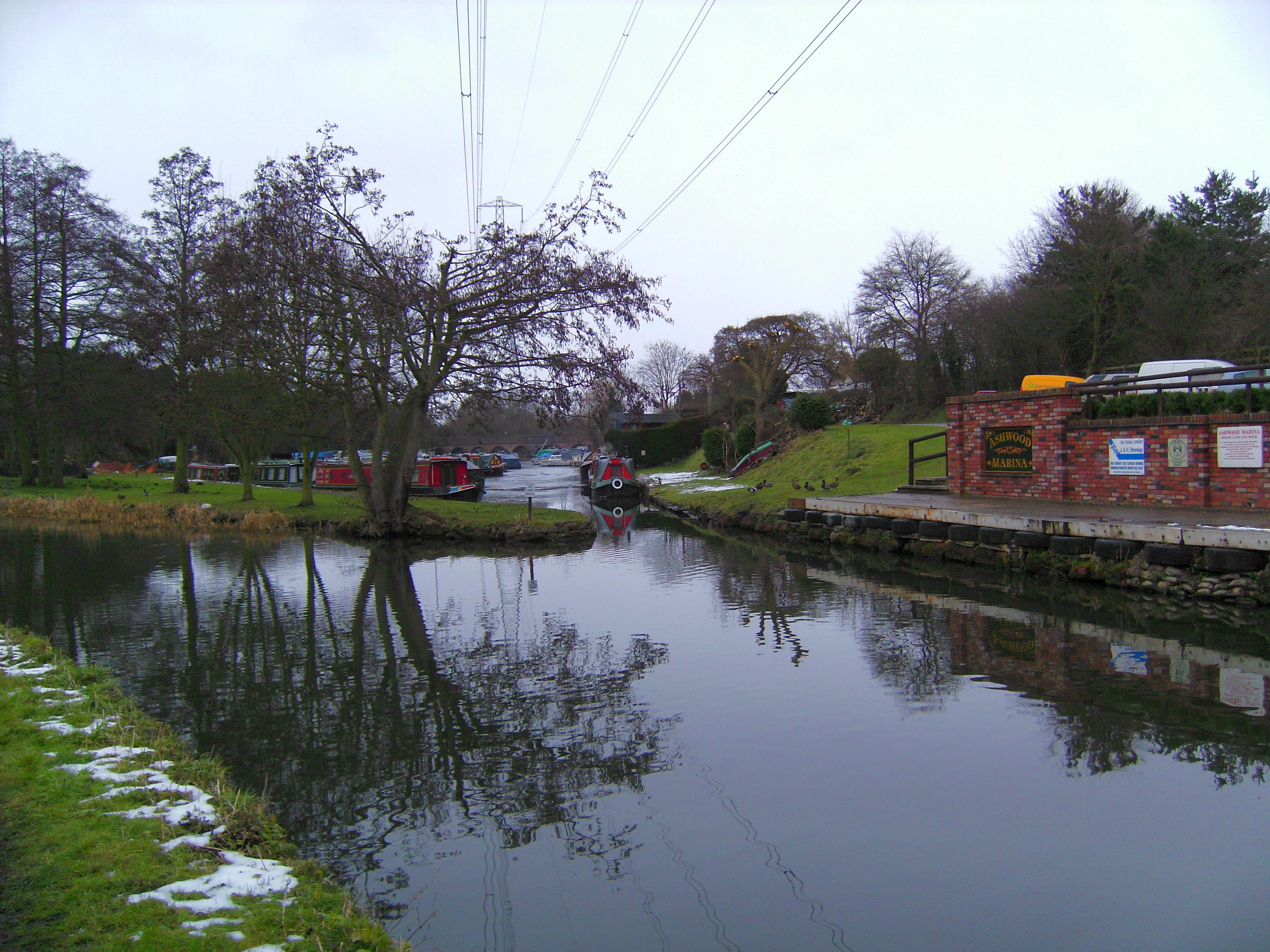
Marina in the canal basin at Ashwood, Staffordshire.

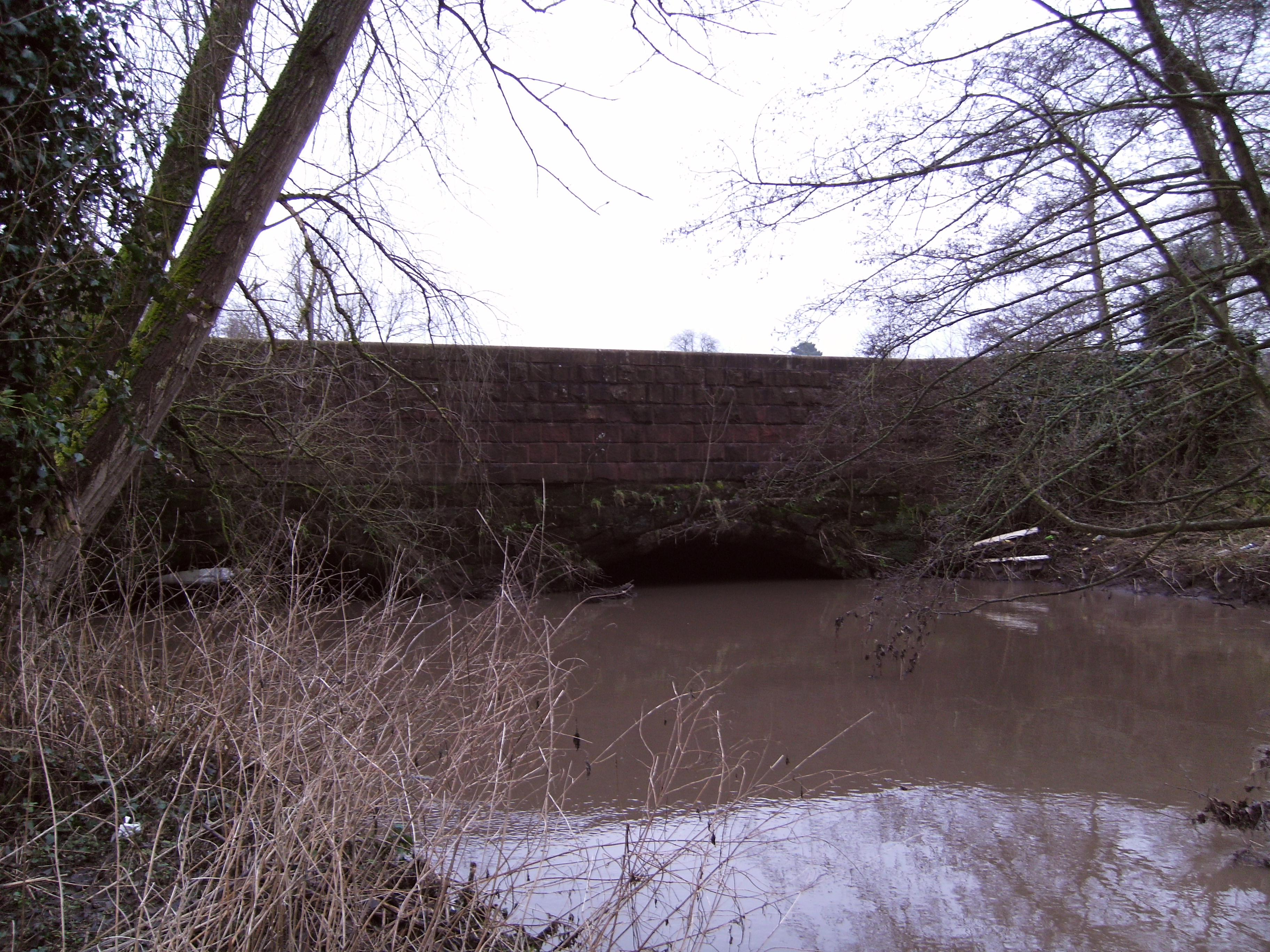
Sandstone aqueduct, carrying the canal over the River Stour, near Prestwood.

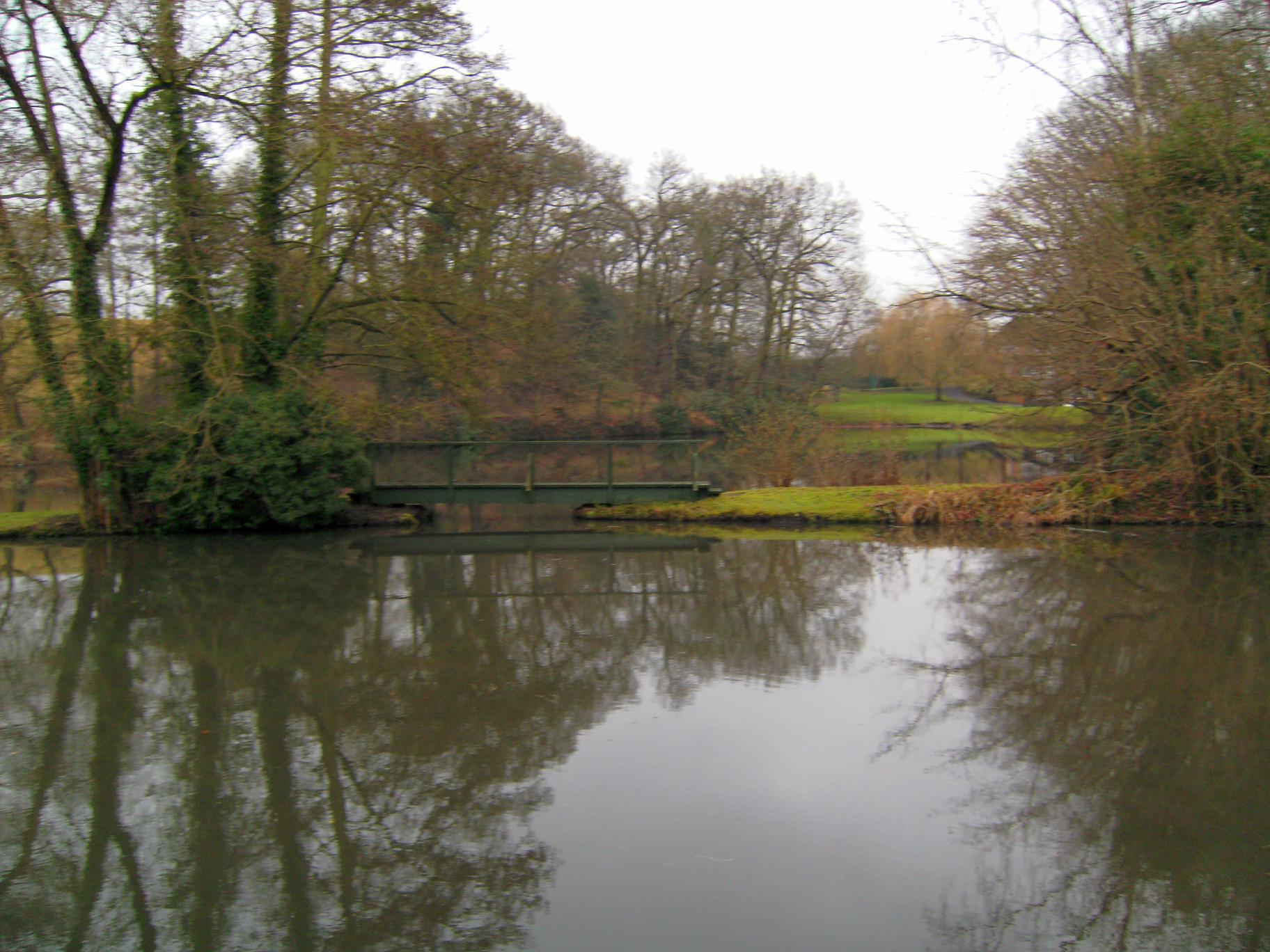
Lake off the canal, near Prestwood, north of Stourton.

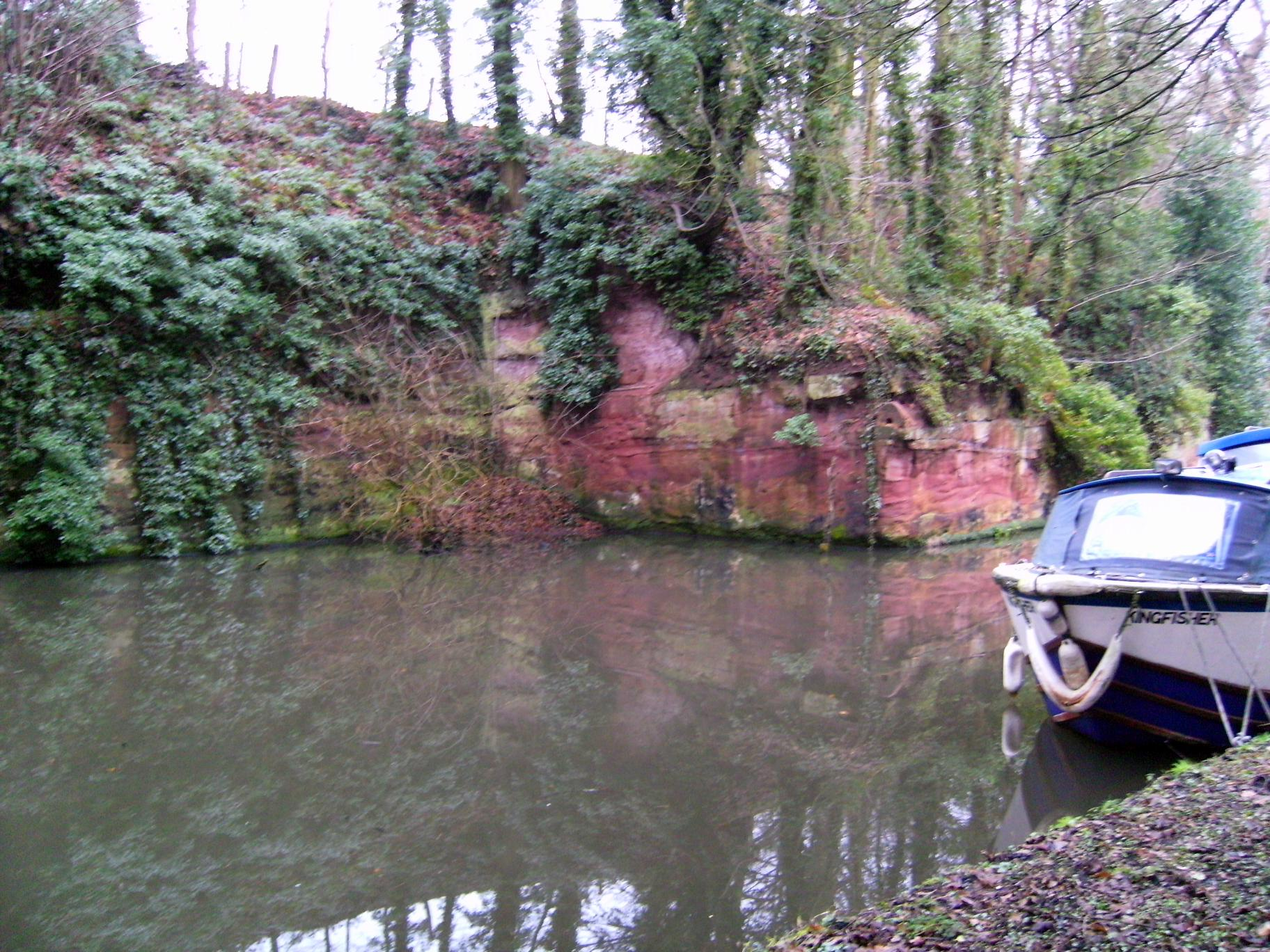
Steep cutting and workings in sandstone, north of Stourton.

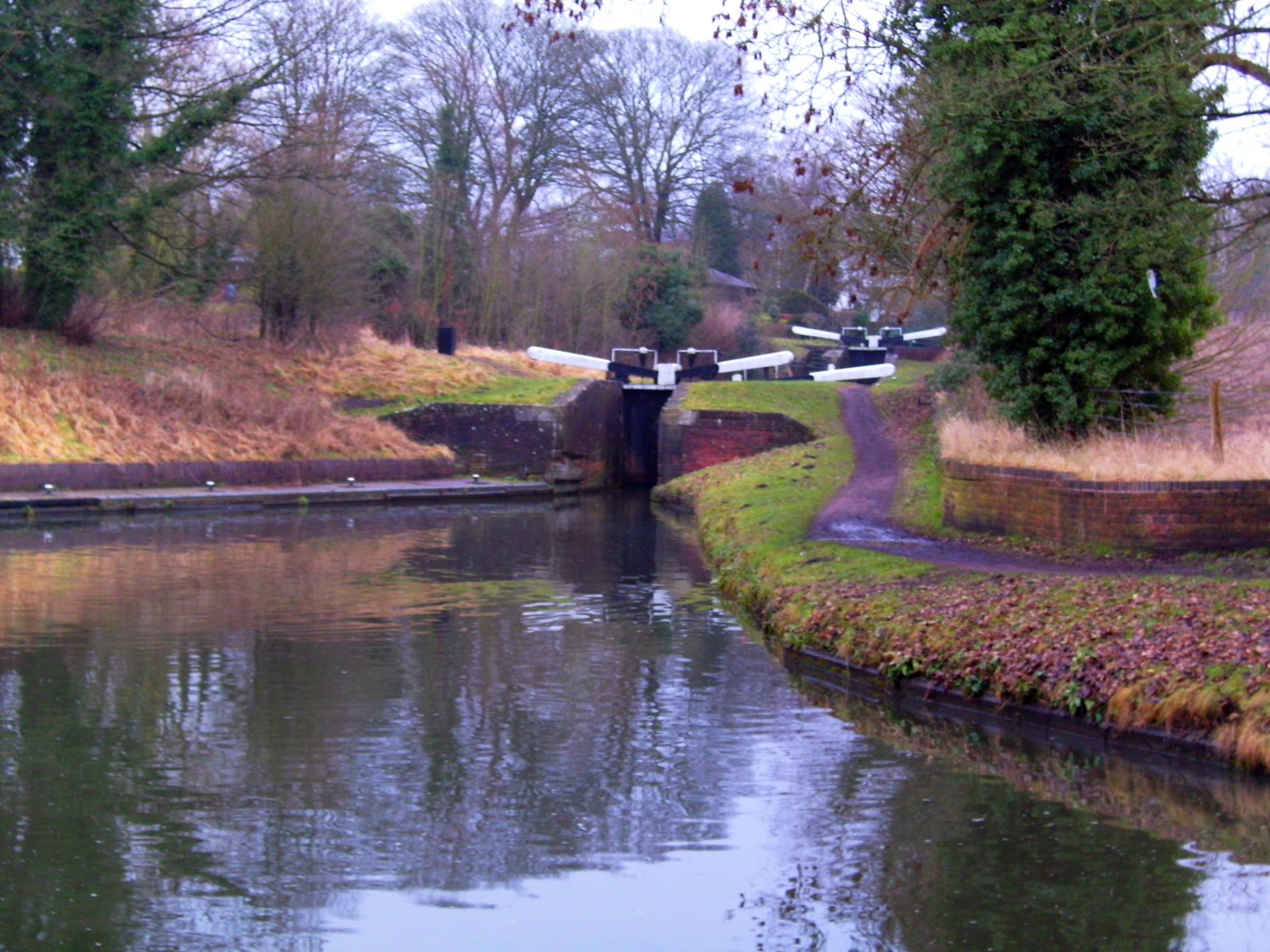
Stourton Junction: the Stourbridge Canal descends through locks to meet the Staffordshire and Worcestershire.

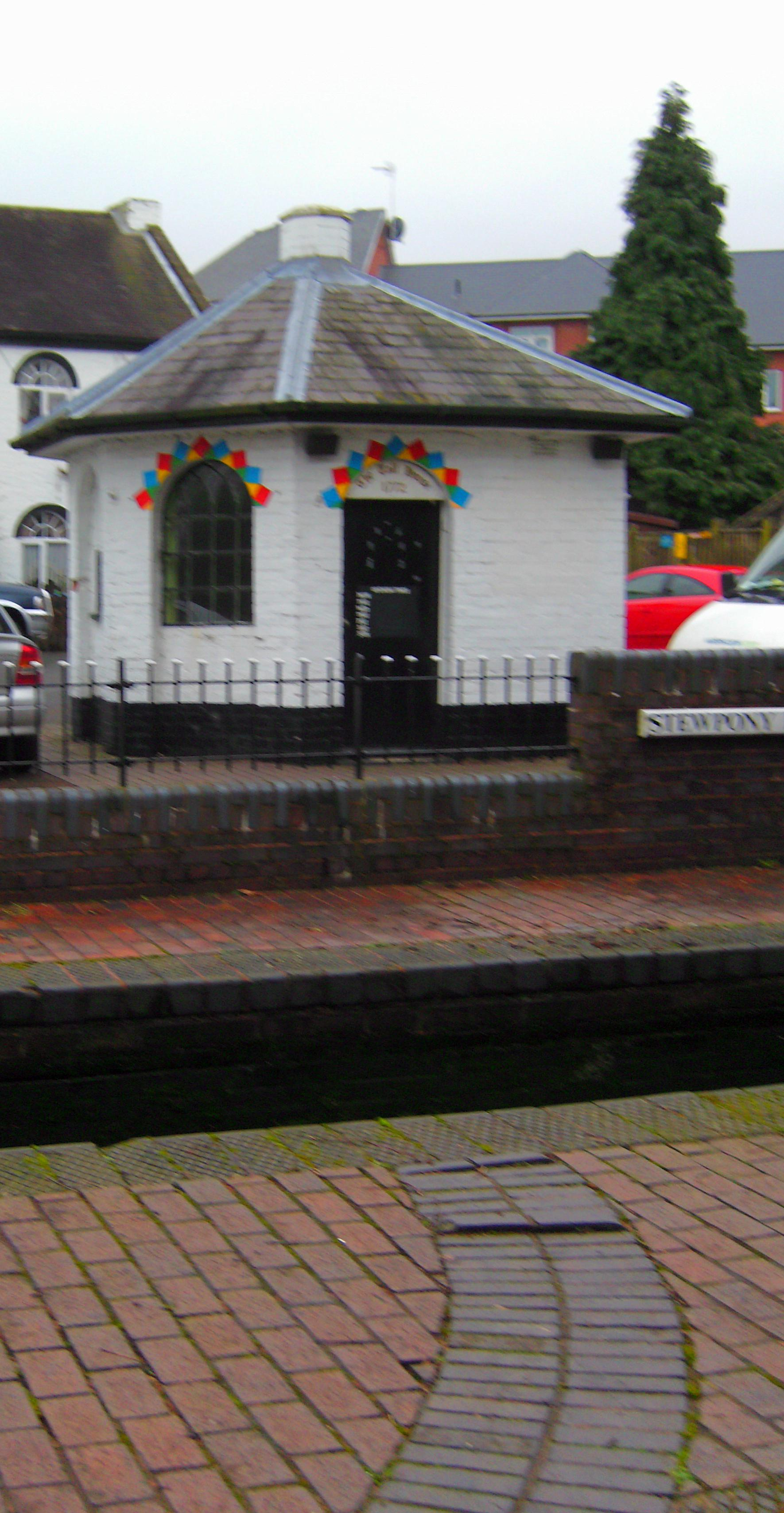
The old toll house at Stewponey Lock.

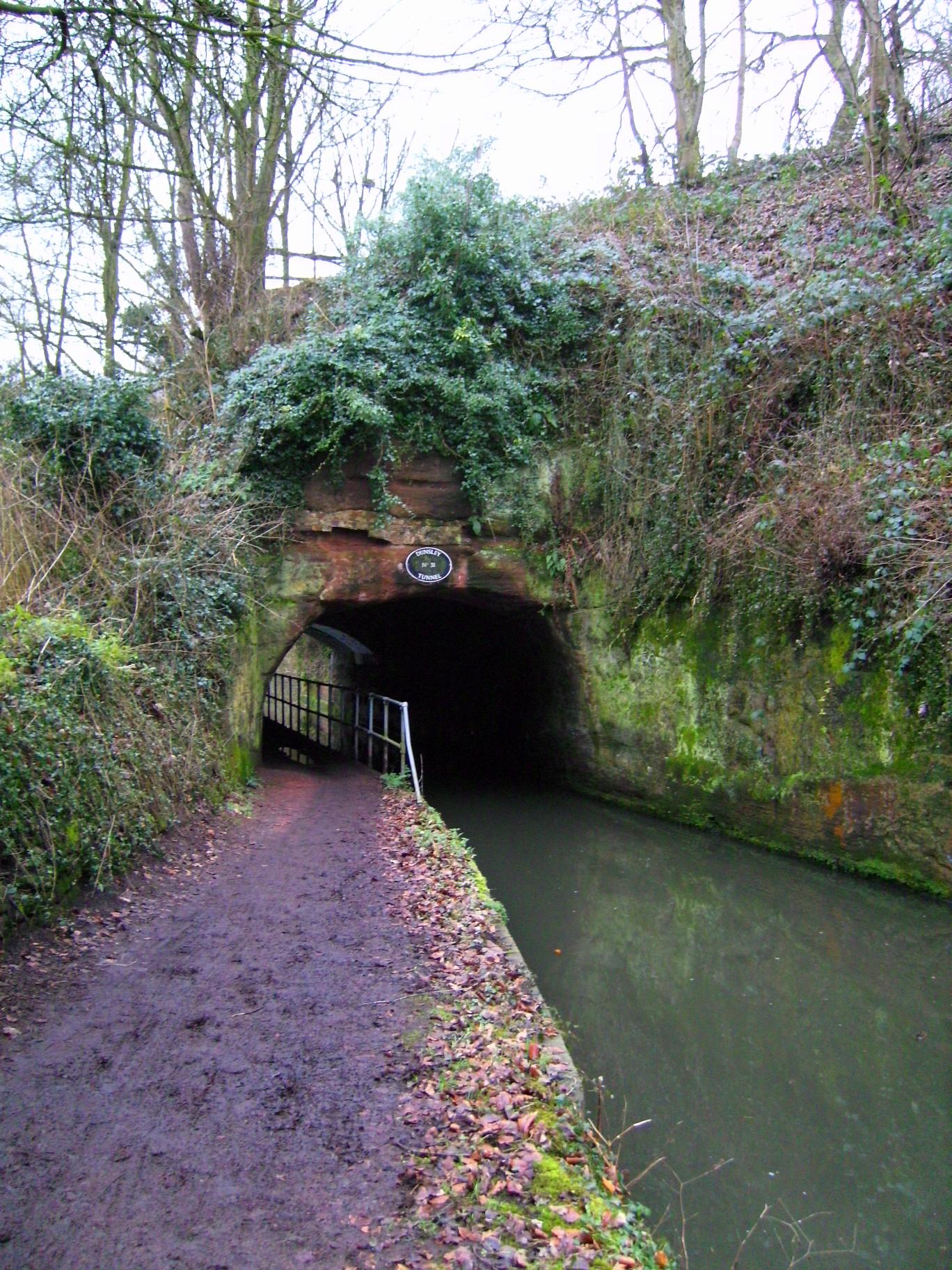
West portal of the 23-yard (21 m) Dunsley Tunnel, between Stourton and Kinver.

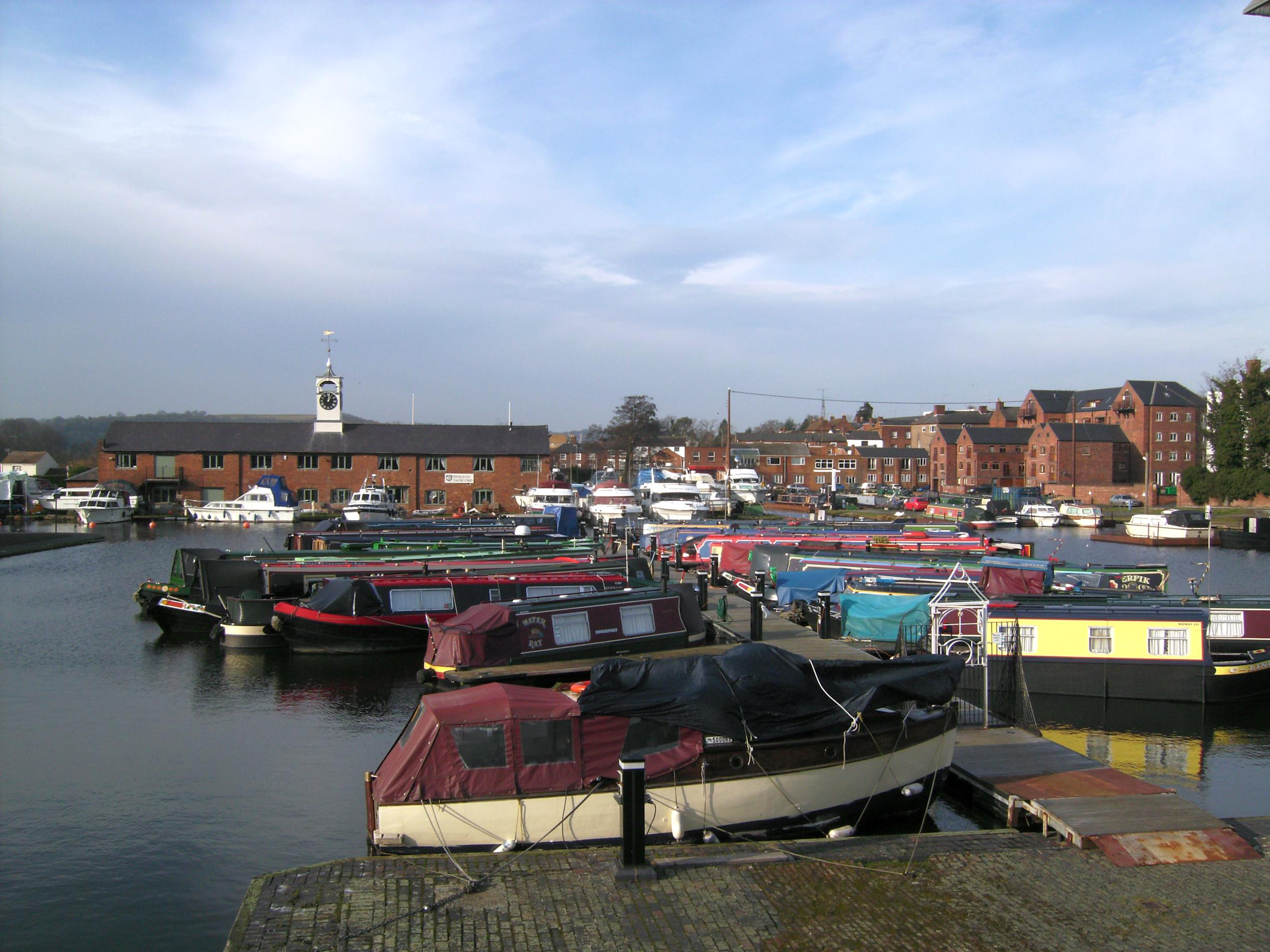
Upper basin at Stourport-on-Severn. The area around the basin underwent major restoration 2007-2009.

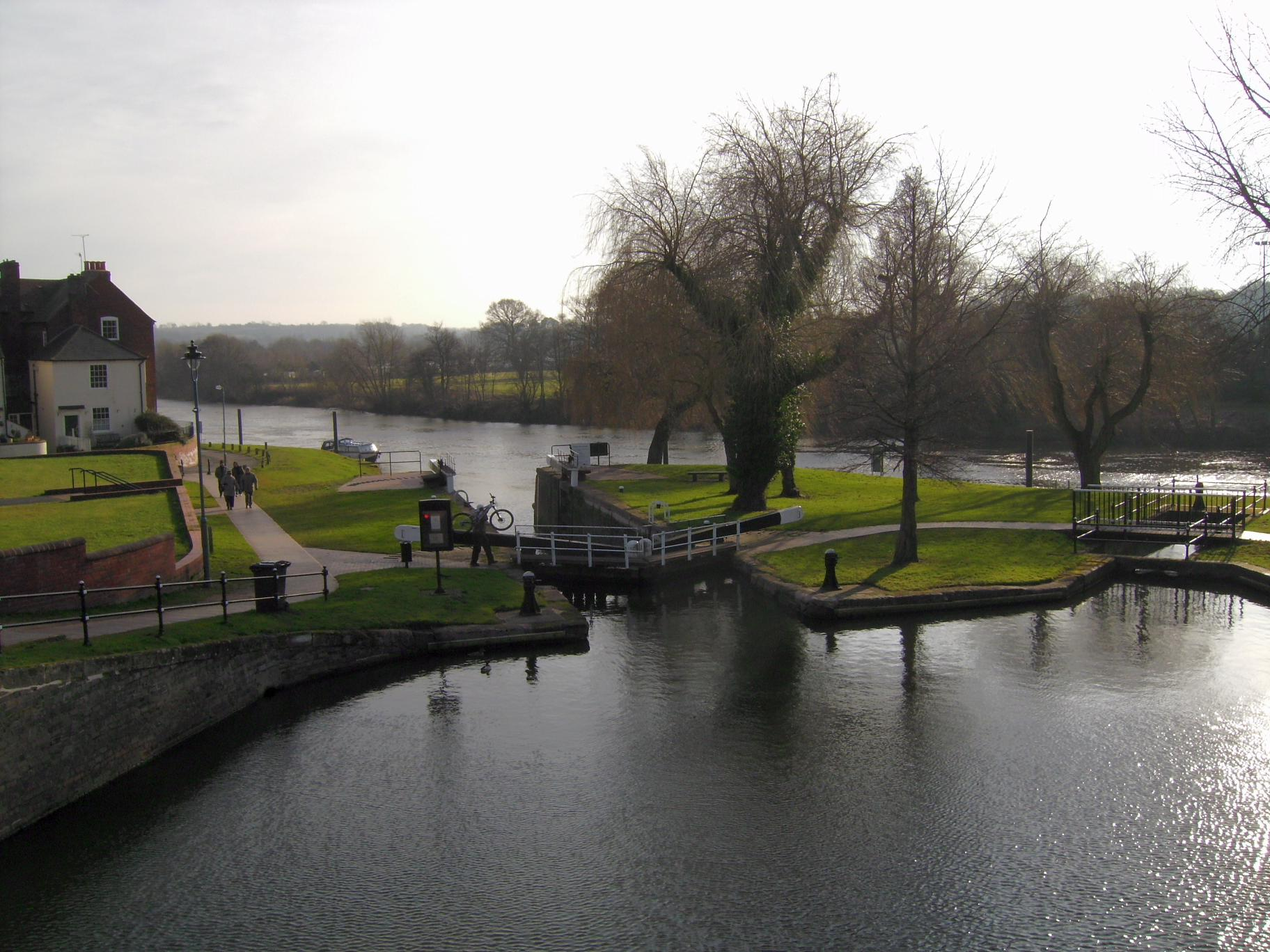
Broad lock connecting the canal with the River Severn at Stourport.

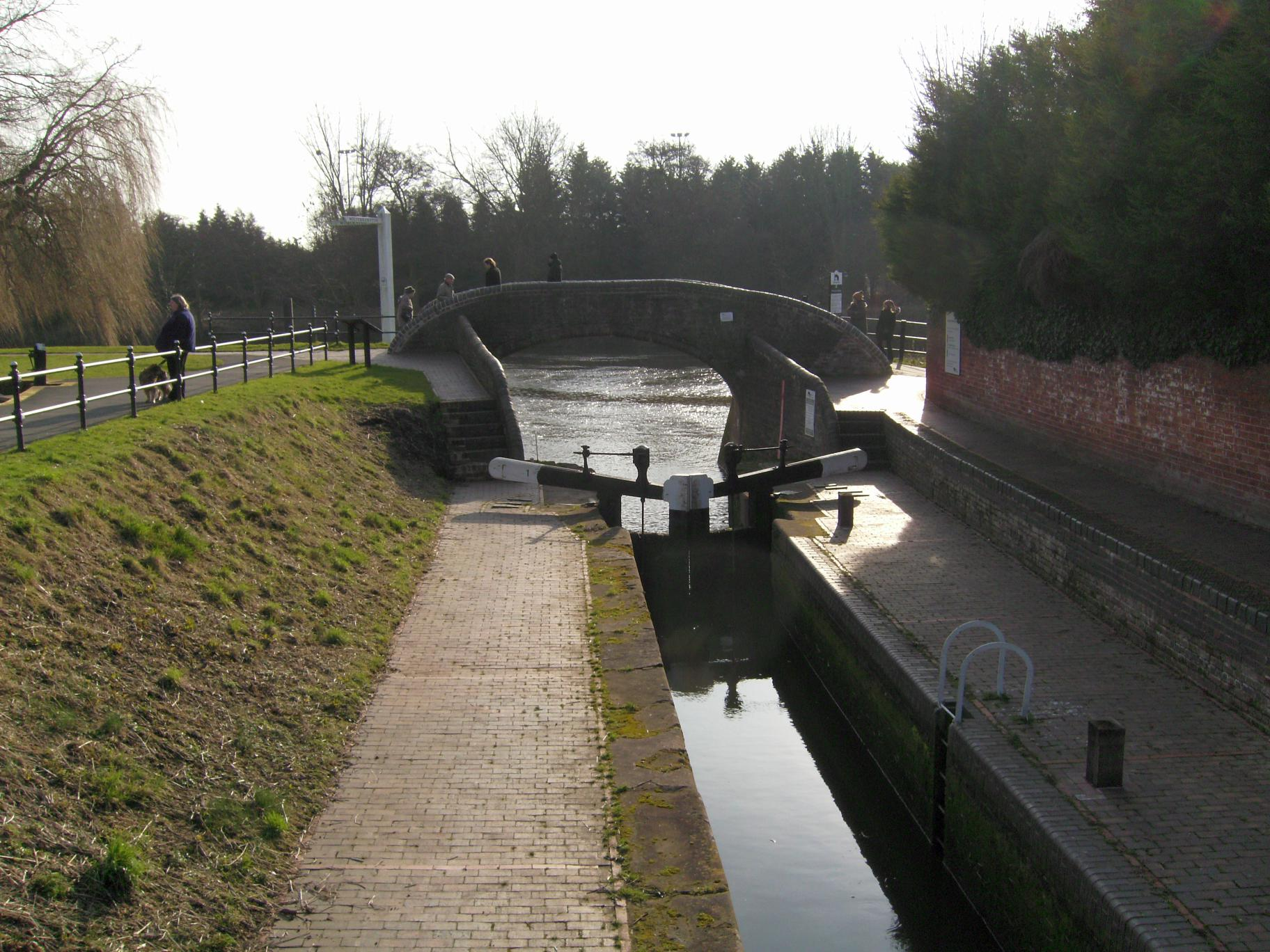
Narrow staircase locks connecting the canal with the River Severn at Stourport.

== Linked canals ==
The canal is linked (in order, from the Severn) to:

- Stourbridge Canal at Stourton Junction
- BCN Main Line at Aldersley Junction
- Shropshire Union Canal at Autherley Junction
- Hatherton Canal, (currently derelict but with proposals for restoration) at Hatherton Junction

The canal today forms part of the Stourport Ring, which is one of the popular cruising rings for leisure boating. It is also part of the Four Counties Ring.

== See also ==
- Thomas Dadford
