= Birmingham and Liverpool Junction Canal =

Canal in England

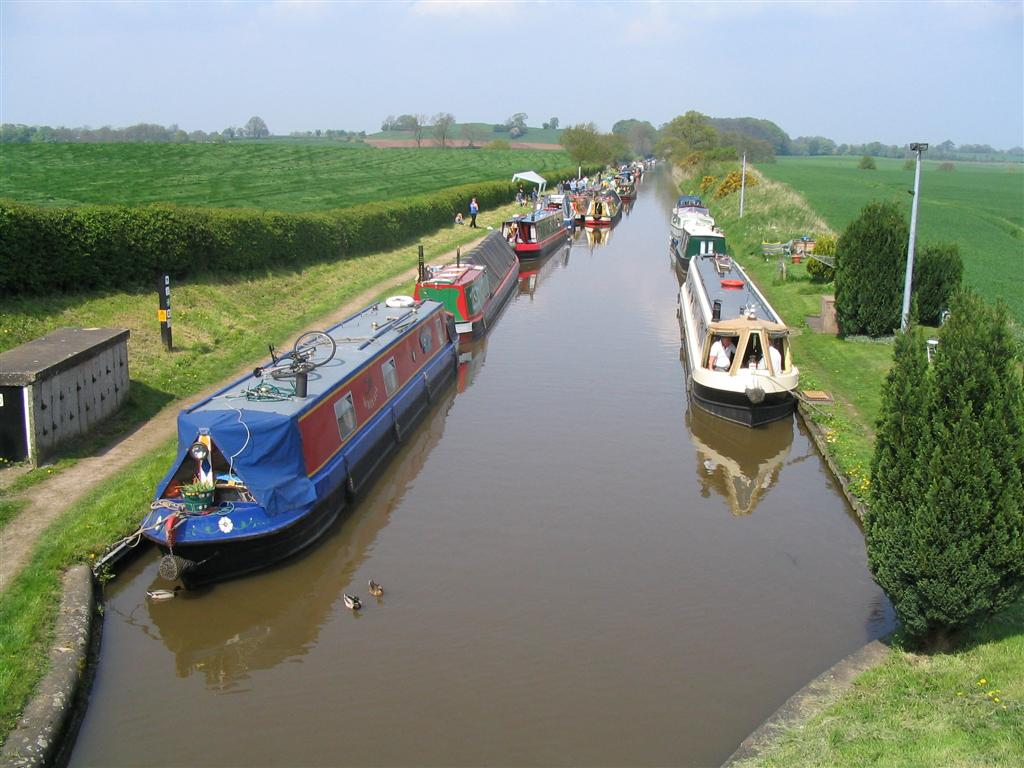
- The former Birmingham and Liverpool Junction Canal near Norbury Junction, now part of the Shropshire Union Canal.
- Interactive map of Birmingham and Liverpool Junction Canal

Specifications
- Maximum boat beam: 7 ft 0 in (2.13 m)
- Locks: 26
- Status: Navigable
- Navigation authority: Canal & River Trust

History
- Original owner: Birmingham and Liverpool Junction Canal Company
- Principal engineer: Thomas Telford
- Date of act: 1825
- Date completed: 1835

Geography
- Start point: Autherley
- End point: Nantwich
- Connects to: Chester Canal, Staffordshire and Worcestershire Canal

The Birmingham and Liverpool Junction Canal was a canal in England which ran from Nantwich, where it joined the Chester Canal, to Autherley, where it joined the Staffordshire and Worcestershire Canal. Forming part of a major link between Liverpool and the industrial heartlands of the Midlands, the canal was opened in 1835, and merged with the Ellesmere and Chester Canal Company in 1845, which became the Shropshire Union Railways and Canal Company in the following year.

Thomas Telford was the engineer for the project, although he became increasingly unwell as it progressed. He faced difficulties, due to the need for large cuttings through unstable rock and high embankments. These contributed to completion being three years later than expected, and a cost overrun of £300,000. Construction included the Newport Branch, to link to the Shrewsbury Canal. The main line was 39.5 miles (63.6 km) long and dropped 176 feet (54 m) through 28 locks between Autherley and Nantwich. The locks were mainly grouped into flights, and water was supplied by Belvide Reservoir, which was later enlarged, and is supplemented by the outflow from Barnhurst sewage treatment works.

Difficulties with tolls led to the suggestion of a bypass around the short section of the Staffordshire and Worcestershire Canal from Autherley Junction and Aldersley Junction, where the Birmingham main line begins, but the threat of losing all tolls led to the Staffordshire and Worcestershire reducing rates to a more reasonable level. The canal was profitable, and remained so until the mid-1960s. It is now used for leisure boating.

== History ==
In 1824, the Birmingham Canal was experiencing unprecedented levels of traffic, and asked the civil engineer Thomas Telford to recommend how the canal could be improved. He reported his suggestions in September, and probably also recommended that an additional link northwards from the western end to the River Mersey would be beneficial, since the Birmingham Canal Company described him as the 'originator and proposer' of the route in January 1825. Faced with competition from a proposed railway line from Birmingham to Liverpool, they sprang into action, and asked their agent, Thomas Eyre Lee, to look at the proposal. The canal would run from Autherley Junction, on the Staffordshire and Worcestershire Canal, close to the end of the Birmingham Canal, and head northwards to Nantwich where it would link up with the former Chester Canal, by then part of the Ellesmere and Chester Canal, to provide the connection to the Mersey at Ellesmere Port.

Birmingham and Liverpool Junction Canal Act 1826
- Act of Parliament
- Parliament of the United Kingdom
- Long title: An Act for making a navigable Canal from the Staffordshire and Worcestershire Canal, in the Parish of Teitenhall in the County of Stafford, to the United Navigation of the Ellesmere and Chester Canals, in the Parish of Acton in the County Palatine of Chester.
- Citation: 7 Geo. 4. c. xcv

Dates
- Royal assent: 26 May 1826

Other legislation
- Repealed by: Ellesmere and Chester Canal Company Act 1845

Status: Repealed

Text of statute as originally enacted

Support for the new venture was widespread. The Ellesmere and Chester Canal was particularly keen, and co-operation with them would be easy, since Telford was their consulting engineer. The Staffordshire and Worcestershire Canal stood to lose some traffic, and so negotiated compensation tolls and protection for their water supply. The Trent and Mersey Canal were also concerned about loss of traffic, and the proposal spurred them on to start work on their Harecastle Tunnel, which had been authorised in 1823. An act of Parliament, the Birmingham and Liverpool Junction Canal Act 1826 (7 Geo. 4. c. xcv), was obtained for the new line in May 1826, which authorised the company to raise a working capital of £400,000, with an extra £100,000 if required. The committee consisted of members from most of the other canals in the region, including the Ellesmere and Chester Canal, the Grand Junction Canal, the Warwick Canals, the Coventry Canal, the Grand Union Canal, the Birmingham Canal, the Wyrley and Essington Canal, the Stratford-upon-Avon Canal, the Worcester and Birmingham Canal, the Staffordshire and Worcestershire Canal, the Dudley Canal, the Stourbridge Canal, the Trent and Mersey Canal, the Shrewsbury Canal and even the Upper Avon. Thomas Eyre Lee was the Clerk.

Birmingham and Liverpool Junction Canal Navigation Act 1827
- Act of Parliament
- Parliament of the United Kingdom
- Long title: An Act to enable the Company of Proprietors of the Birmingham and Liverpool Junction Canal Navigation to alter the Line of the said Navigation; and to make certain Branches therefrom, in the Counties of Stafford and Salop.
- Citation: 7 & 8 Geo. 4. c. ii

Dates
- Royal assent: 21 March 1827

Other legislation
- Repealed by: Ellesmere and Chester Canal Company Act 1845

Status: Repealed

Text of statute as originally enacted

Birmingham and Liverpool Junction Canal Navigation Act 1842
- Act of Parliament
- Parliament of the United Kingdom
- Long title: An Act for granting further Powers to the Company of Proprietors of the Birmingham and Liverpool Junction Canal Navigation.
- Citation: 5 & 6 Vict. c. xxx

Dates
- Royal assent: 13 May 1842

Other legislation
- Repealed by: Ellesmere and Chester Canal Company Act 1845

Status: Repealed

Text of statute as originally enacted

Birmingham and Liverpool Junction Canal Navigation (No. 2) Act 1842
- Act of Parliament
- Parliament of the United Kingdom
- Long title: An Act for regulating the Communication between the Birmingham and Liverpool Junction Canal Navigation and the Staffordshire and Worcestershire Canal Navigation, and for amending the several Acts relating to such first-mentioned Canal Navigation.
- Citation: 5 & 6 Vict. c. xl

Dates
- Royal assent: 18 June 1842

Text of statute as originally enacted

The project engineer was Thomas Telford, and work started from the northern end when a contract for the section from Nantwich to High Offley was awarded to John Wilson, with Alexander Easton acting as resident engineer. As progress was made, links to the Donningtonn area and Shrewsbury were considered, and an act of Parliament, the Birmingham and Liverpool Junction Canal Navigation Act 1827 (7 & 8 Geo. 4. c. ii), was obtained for a branch from Norbury Junction to Wappenshall on the Shrewsbury Canal. The Ellesmere and Chester Canal obtained authorisation for their Middlewich branch as a similar time, giving the new canal connections to Manchester and the Potteries. A second contract for the High Offley to Church Eaton section was awarded to W. A. Provis in 1829, who also became responsible for construction of the Newport Branch to the Shrewsbury Canal. The third contract, for the remainer of the canal from Church Eaton to Autherley, was given to John Wilson, and transferred to W. Wilson after John died.

Telford faced a number of engineering problems during construction, including a number of long cuttings through marl, some up to 90 feet (27 m) deep. The rock was unstable and slippage was a constant problem. He also had to construct a diversion around the game reserves of Lord Anson at Shelmore, which involved an embankment around 1 mile (1.6 km) long and up to 60 feet (18 m) high. By this time his health was failing, but William Provis was a competent contractor, and managed to overcome the difficulties, under the direction of William Cubitt, who had been asked by the proprietors to assist, and effectively took over the day-to-day work from Telford as his health continued to decline. The company also faced financial pressures, as by the end of 1831 they had already spent £442,000 on the work. They borrowed £160,000 from the Exchequer Bill Loan Commissioners in November 1831, and another £24,600 in 1832. They were hopeful that the canal would be open by the end of 1832, but the Shelmore embankment took much longer than expected. Knighton Reservoir had been completed by the end of the year, and work on Belvide Reservoir had begun. The canal was finally finished in 1835, with the section from Autherley to Gnosall opening on 12 January and the rest, including the Newport Branch, opening on 2 March. The total cost was around £800,000, with the extra money coming from shareholders and the Exchequer Bill Loan Commissioners.

The length of the canal was 39.5 miles (63.6 km) and required 28 locks to drop the 176 ft (53.7m) from Autherley to Nantwich. These were mainly concentrated in flights, with five locks at Tyrley, another five at Adderley, fifteen at Audlem and two at Hack Green. There was a single lock at Wheaton Aston, and a stop lock at Autherley Junction to prevent the canal from taking water from the Staffordshire and Worcestershire Canal. It was built as a narrow canal, for boats with a maximum width of 7 ft (2.1m). The main supply of water was from the Belvide Reservoir, on the initial section near to where the canal crossed Watling Street (now the A5 road) on an aqueduct. This was not adequate, and so in 1836 it was doubled in size; it now has a capacity of 70 million cubic metres. This was later supplemented by the outflow from the Barnhurst sewage treatment works which was built near Autherley Junction, to serve the people of Wolverhampton.

The company worked closely with the Ellesmere and Chester Canal Company, which owned the canals from Ellesmere Port to Chester and from Chester to Nantwich, in a bid to maintain their profits against competition from the railways. This led to the company being taken over by the Ellesmere and Chester Canal Company in 1845, and the following year the joint company became the Shropshire Union Railways and Canal Company, by an act of Parliament which also authorised the taking over of a number of other canals. In 1847, the new company agreed to the terms of a lease from the London and North Western Railway Company, and so lost its independence after little more than a year, but continued to manage the canals under its control.

== Operation ==
The new canal was a significant improvement over the previous route, which used the Trent and Mersey Canal to move goods between Birmingham and Liverpool. From Birmingham to the Mersey, it was 20 miles (32 km) shorter, with 30 fewer locks, while to Manchester, it was 5.25 miles (8.4 km) shorter, again with 30 fewer locks. When the Macclesfield Canal opened, it provided a shorter route to Manchester for boats using the Trent and Mersey, by some 4.75 miles (7.6 km), but the shorter distance was offset by it passing through 50 more locks than the journey using the Birmingham and Liverpool Junction Canal.

There was always contention over the compensation toll which the Staffordshire and Worcestershire Canal charged for using the short stretch between the Birmingham Canal and Autherley Junction. This had originally been set at 2 shillings per ton, but they halved this to 1 shilling in 1831, while the new canal was still being built. In an attempt to drive down the charge, a group of men from the Birmingham Canal and the Birmingham and Liverpool Junction Canal proposed the construction of the Tettenhall and Autherley Canal and Aqueduct in mid 1835. This would be a short canal which would bypass the Staffordshire and Worcestershire Canal section from Aldersley Junction to Autherley Junction, crossing the Staffordshire and Worcestershire on an aqueduct. The Staffordshire and Worcestershire sent a delegation to meet the group in December 1835, but were unhappy with the outcome. The group introduced a bill to Parliament in February 1836, and when it was due to receive its second reading, the Staffordshire and Worcestershire caved in, sent a delegation to London to negotiate and agreed a compensation toll of 4 pence per ton, at which point the bill was withdrawn. The threat of an aqueduct was a recurring theme, as it was used again in 1842 to get more water, and subsequently by the Shropshire Union Canal in 1867, when another water agreement was negotiated, together with the reduction of the toll to 2 pence.

Tolls for carriage of goods on the canal were set lower than had been proposed, due to the threat of railway competition. Lime and limestone were set at a half-penny per ton, with everything else being charged at 1 penny per ton. 5,144 boat journeys were recorded during the first half of 1836, carrying 71,405 tons of cargo. This was made up of 22,732 tons of general merchandise, 25,685 tons of iron, 9,631 tons of coal and coke, 4,532 tons of building materials, 8,546 tons of lime and limestone, and 279 tons of road materials, manure, etc. Income from tolls was £11,706 in 1836, rising to 30,859 by 1840, and then tailing off a little.

The company became authorised to carry passengers and goods in 1842, and could also provide haulage for boats owned by other carriers. The engineer Alexander Easton and the canal superintendend Samual Skey carried out trials in which a steam tug was used to haul trains of boats along the canal. These proved successful, and by late 1843 they had eight steam tugs which were used to haul boats from Autherley to Ellesmere Port. However, the Ellesmere and Chester Canal started to look at converting their canal to a railway in 1845, and argued that locomotive working on a railway was probably cheaper than using tugs to pull trains of boats on a canal. The project was abandoned soon afterwards, and William Bishton was contracted to supply horse haulage for boats on the canal.

Despite its rural character, the canal was an important route for trade between two major centres, and so remained profitable long after many canals had become uneconomic. When most of the Shropshire Union system was closed by the London Midland and Scottish Railway (Canals) Act 1944 (8 & 9 Geo. 6. c. ii), the former Birmingham and Liverpool section and the route onwards to Ellesmere Port remained open, as it was still an important carrier of metal and oil products, and remained so until the mid-1960s.

The rural character of the canal is now one of its greatest assets, in the age of pleasure cruising and boating holidays.

== Points of interest ==
Point	Coordinates (Links to map resources)	OS Grid Ref	Notes
Nantwich Basin	53.0726°N 2.5402°W	SJ639529	Jn with Chester Canal
Hack Green Locks	53.0318°N 2.5367°W	SJ641484	2 locks
Moss Hall Aqueduct	52.9954°N 2.5176°W	SJ653443	over River Weaver
top of Audlem Locks	52.9697°N 2.5087°W	SJ659414	15 lock flight
top of Adderley Locks	52.9495°N 2.4924°W	SJ670392	5 lock flight
top of Tyrley Locks	52.8883°N 2.4607°W	SJ691324	5 lock flight
Norbury Junction	52.8024°N 2.3081°W	SJ793228	Jn with derelict Shrewsbury Canal
Wheaton Aston Lock	52.7116°N 2.2114°W	SJ858126	
Autherley Stop Lock	52.6165°N 2.1474°W	SJ901020	Jn with Staffs and Worcs Canal

== Bibliography ==
- Cumberlidge, Jane (2009). Inland Waterways of Great Britain (8th Ed.). Imray Laurie Norie and Wilson. ISBN 978-1-84623-010-3.
- Hadfield, Charles (1985). The Canals of the West Midlands. David and Charles. ISBN 978-0-7153-8644-6.
- McKnight, Hugh (1981). Shell Book of Inland Waterways. David and Charles. ISBN 978-0-7153-8239-4.
- Nicholson (2006). Nicholson Guides Vol 4: Four Counties and the Welsh Canals. Harper Collins. ISBN 978-0-00-721112-8.
- Skempton, Sir Alec; et al. (2002). A Biographical Dictionary of Civil Engineers in Great Britain and Ireland: Vol 1: 1500 to 1830. Thomas Telford. ISBN 978-0-7277-2939-2.

== See also ==
- Canals of Great Britain
- History of the British canal system
- Shropshire Union Canal
