= Haywood Junction =

Canal junction

Coordinates: 52°48′15″N 2°00′32″W

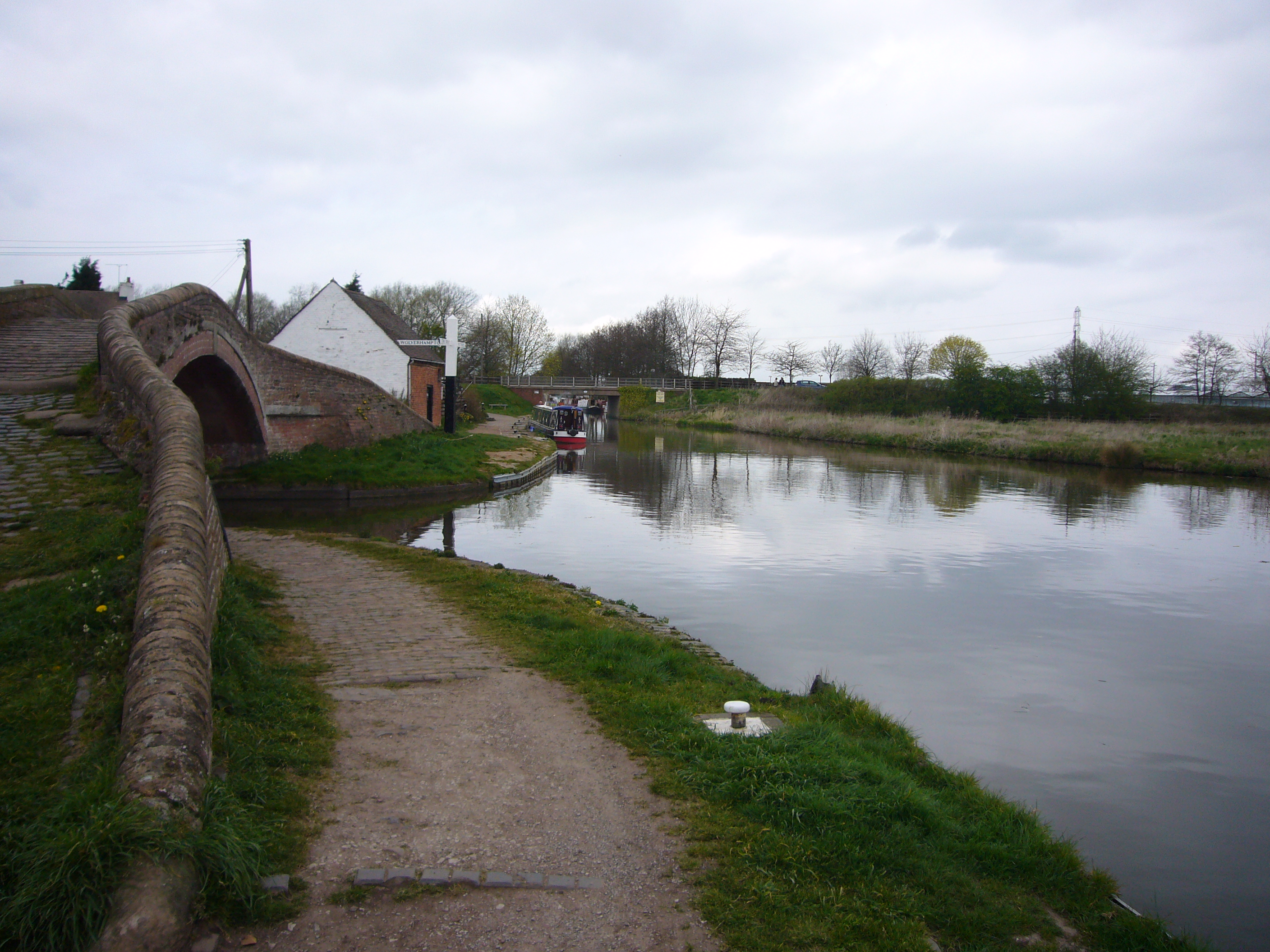
- Haywood Junction, with the Staffordshire and Worcestershire Canal through the roving bridge
- Interactive map of Haywood Junction

Specifications
- Status: Open
- Navigation authority: Canal & River Trust

History
- Date completed: 1772

Haywood Junction (grid reference SJ994229), or Great Haywood Junction, is the name of the canal junction where the Staffordshire and Worcestershire Canal terminates and meets the Trent and Mersey Canal near to the village of Great Haywood, Staffordshire, England.

== History ==
The Trent and Mersey Canal was conceived as a way to provide a link between Liverpool and Hull, passing through the Potteries. It was authorised by an Act of Parliament in 1766, and with James Brindley acting as engineer, its 93 miles (150 km) were completed eleven years later in 1777.

Brindley also built the Staffordshire and Worcestershire Canal, which was begun at much the same time as the Trent and Mersey, and was completed in 1772. It joined the Trent and Mersey Canal at Great Haywood, and was part of his Grand Cross plan to link four English estuaries: the Humber, Thames, Severn and Mersey. Haywood Junction therefore became a major transport interchange.

== Location ==
At Great Haywood, the Trent and Mersey Canal heads north, as it continues its ascent from Derwent Mouth towards its short summit near Stoke on Trent. Haywood Lock is just to the south, while Hoo Mill Lock is a little further to the north. The River Trent runs to the west of the canal, much too small at this point to support navigation. Derwent Mouth, where the canal joins the river, is 39 miles (63 km) from the junction, while Etruria Lock, where the summit level begins, is 18.9 miles (30.4 km) away.

The Staffordshire and Worcestershire Canal heads west from the junction. The Trent and Mersey towpath is carried over it by a bridge, and almost immediately, it crosses the River Trent on an aqueduct. It follows the valley of the River Sow, which joins the Trent below the junction, and soon reaches Tixall Wide, a broad expanse of water, which, although it looks like a lake, is deep enough to allow boats to reach its edges. Shugborough Park and Hall, now owned by the National Trust, is located to the south, and Tixall Gatehouse is to the north. The canal ascends through Tixall Lock, after which is crossed the Sow on another aqueduct. Tixall Lock is 1.3 miles (2.1 km) from the junction.

Shugborough Hall was begun in 1695, was extended in the 1760s, and some remodelling was carried out at the end of the eighteenth century by Samuel Wyatt. Internally, the plasterwork is magnificent, and the building is grade I listed. Many of the structures within the grounds are also listed. Tixall Lodge is a small octagonal-shaped building with a stone dome, which bears the date 1807. It is grade II listed, as is the roving bridge at the junction. Just to the south of Haywood Lock, a bridge carries a footpath from Great Haywood to Shugborough Hall. The path crosses the Trent at Essex Bridge, a grade I listed structure with fourteen arches, which is only 4 feet (1.2 m) wide. It was probably built in the 1500s, and is virtually unaltered.

== See also ==
- Canals of the United Kingdom
- History of the British canal system

== Bibliography ==
- Cumberlidge, Jane (2009). Inland Waterways of Great Britain (8th Ed.). Imray Laurie Norie and Wilson. ISBN 978-1-84623-010-3.
- Mosse, Jonathan (2010). Waterways of Britain. Times Books. ISBN 978-0-00-787363-0.
- Nicholson (2003). Nicholson Guide Vol 3: Birmingham and the Heart of England. Harper Collins.
- Pearson, Michael (1990). Canal Companion - Midland Rings. J. M. Pearson & Associates. ISBN 0-907864-53-8.
