= British Transport Commission =

Industrial organisation

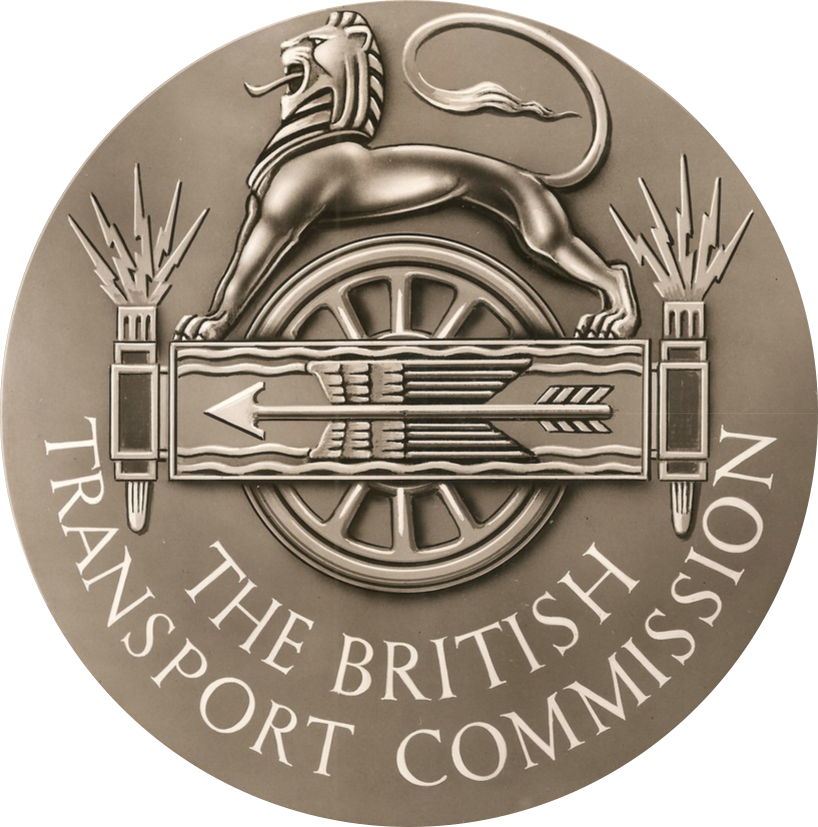
- Seal of the BTC, designed by Cecil Thomas. It comprises "a lion bestriding a composite symbol which includes a wheel; a winged arrow superimposed on a pattern of wavy lines symbolising the activities of the Docks and Inland Waterways Executive; and a pair of torches emitting flashes of lightning, symbolising modern forms of power".
- Type: Statutory corporation (Note: The British Transport Commission was created by the Transport Act 1947 (i.e. a statute), which provided that it was "body corporate with perpetual succession".)
- Founded: 1 January 1948; 78 years ago
- Defunct: 1 January 1964; 62 years ago (Note: Section 80 of the Transport Act 1962 provide that the British Transport Commission was to be dissolved on the "vesting date", which was defined as 1 January 1963 by paragraph 1 of the Transport Act 1962 (Vesting Date) Order 1962, unless it appeared to the Minister of Transport that more time was required to effect the transfer of property and rights to its successor entities. To give more time to effect the transfer of property and rights belonging to the British Transport Commission outside Great Britain to its successor entities, the dissolution date was postponed four times by statutory instrument to 1 April 1963, 1 July 1963, 1 October 1963, and finally to 1 January 1964, the date on which it was dissolved.)
- Fate: Dissolved
- Successor: British Railways Board; British Transport Docks Board; British Waterways Board; London Transport Board; Transport Holding Company

The British Transport Commission (BTC) was created by Clement Attlee's post-war Labour government as a part of its nationalisation programme, to oversee railways, canals and road freight transport in Great Britain (Northern Ireland had the separate Ulster Transport Authority). Its general duty under the Transport Act 1947 (10 & 11 Geo. 6. c. 49) was to provide an efficient, adequate, economical and properly integrated system of public inland transport and port facilities within Great Britain for passengers and goods, excluding transport by air.

The BTC came into operation on 1 January 1948. Its first chairman was Lord Hurcomb, with Miles Beevor as Chief Secretary. Its main holdings were the networks and assets of the Big Four national regional railway companies: the Great Western Railway, London and North Eastern Railway, London, Midland and Scottish Railway and the Southern Railway. It also took over 55 other railway undertakings, 19 canal undertakings and 246 road haulage firms, as well as the work of the London Passenger Transport Board, which was already publicly owned. The nationalisation package also included the fleets of 'private owner wagons', which industrial concerns had used to transport goods on the railway networks.

== Organisation ==
The BTC was one of the largest industrial organisations in the world, and owned a vast number of transport-related assets. The assets owned at its creation included: 52,000 miles (84,000 km) of railway track, 1.3 million freight and service railway vehicles, 40,000 passenger railway coaches, 20,148 locomotives, 93,000 road vehicles, 2,050 miles (3,300 km) of canals, 122 steamships, 54 hotels and 52,000 houses. In March 1953, it had 877,000 staff.

At first, the commission did not directly operate transport services, which were the responsibility of the commission's executives. These bodies were separately appointed, and operated under what were termed 'schemes of delegation'. The act provided for five executives, covering Docks and Inland Waterways, Hotels, London Transport, Railways, and Road Transport.

The Railway Executive traded as British Railways. In 1949, Road Transport was divided into separate Road Haulage and Road Passenger Executives, though the latter proved short-lived.

The commission was permitted to "secure the provision" of road passenger services, although it did not have the general powers of compulsory purchase of bus operators. To obtain specific powers of acquisition it had first to draw up, and get approval for, a 'Road Scheme', area by area. Only one was published, the North East Area Road Scheme, though work began on a second scheme, covering East Anglia; this was never confirmed, as it was fiercely opposed by private and municipal operators.

The quasi-federal structure of commission and executives proved to be an obstacle to integration and was largely abolished by the Conservative government with effect from 1 October 1953 (the London Transport Executive alone survived). On 1 January 1955, the railways were re-organised on the basis of six area railway boards, which had a wide measure of operational autonomy under the commission's overall supervision. The commission took direct charge of the remaining assets, though these were significantly reduced by the Conservatives de-nationalising much of the road haulage sector. On 1 January 1955, separate managements were also set up for road haulage, hotels, docks and inland waterways.

=== Buses ===
The Tilling Group sold its bus interests to the BTC in September 1948, as did the Scottish Motor Traction group in April 1949 and the Red and White Group in 1950. The Midland Counties Electric Supply Company, a former subsidiary of Balfour Beatty, had three bus-operating subsidiaries: Mansfield District Traction Company; Midland General Omnibus Company; and the Nottinghamshire and Derbyshire Traction Company. Midland Counties Electric Supply had been nationalised in 1948 to become part of the newly-created British Electricity Authority (BEA), and on 1 April 1948, the BEA transferred its three bus fleets to the BTC. From the railway companies, the BTC also inherited non-controlling interests in many bus companies in the British Electric Traction Group. It also manufactured buses for its own use, through the subsidiaries Bristol Tramways (from 1955 Bristol Commercial Vehicles) and Eastern Coach Works. In London and the surrounding area, the BTC ran both the (red) London buses and the (green) country buses, including Green Line Coaches, through the London Transport Executive.

=== Docks and Inland Waterways ===
These assets included canals and navigable rivers, mainly taken over from canal companies – such as the Grand Union Canal Carrying Company and Fellows Morton & Clayton – but also those bought out earlier by the pre-nationalisation railways. The Caledonian Canal was already state-owned. The assets passed to British Waterways in 1963, and later to the Canal & River Trust and Scottish Canals. As well as the canal infrastructure, BTC also managed canal carrying services.

British Transport Docks (today known as Associated British Ports), comprising 32 ports taken over from the railway companies, and was part of the Docks and Inland Waterways Executive.

=== Museums ===
The BTC inherited the LNER's Railway Museum at York and appointed a Curator of Historical Relics to build up a national collection. Eventually, much of this collection was displayed at the Museum of British Transport at Clapham, south London. This closed in the early 1970s and was superseded by the National Railway Museum at York and the London Transport Museum (now in Covent Garden). The BTC also established the Stoke Bruerne Canal Museum.

=== Railways and hotels ===
This included British Railways, including ancillary activities like engineering workshops, and London Underground. The former LMS lines in Northern Ireland (see Northern Counties Committee) were sold to the Ulster Transport Authority in 1949.

A travel agent, Thomas Cook & Son, was part of the Railways Executive.

The former railway hotels and catering departments initially came under the control of the Railway Executive, but on 1 July 1948 they were transferred to the Hotels Executive. Between 1953 and 1963, the business operated as British Transport Hotel and Catering Services; and in 1963 it became the British Transport Hotels.

=== Road haulage ===
This included the local road distribution networks of the pre-nationalisation rail companies, plus the removals company Pickfords, which the railways had owned jointly. To these were added numerous smaller independent concerns taken over at nationalisation, comprising all undertakings predominantly engaged in ordinary long-distance work for distances of 40 miles (64 km) or upwards. These networks were later re-organised as British Road Services (BRS).

=== Other activities ===
British Transport Advertising sold space on premises and vehicles.

The BTC had its own film production company, British Transport Films.

The British Transport Commission Police was formed chiefly by the amalgamation of the various railway constabularies.

Former railway steamer services, primarily to France and Ireland and around the Scottish coast, and investments in Associated Humber Lines and the Atlantic Steam Navigation Company (including the Transport Ferry Service), were part of the Railway Executive. The passenger ferry services of the former railway companies were also operated; these eventually became Sealink.

The South London tramways of London Transport, all of which were abandoned by 5 July 1952, were part of the London Transport Executive.

== Abolition ==
By the late 1950s the BTC was in serious financial difficulties, largely due to the economic performance of the railways. It was criticised as an overly bureaucratic system of administering transport services and had failed to develop an integrated transport system (such as integrated ticketing and timetabling). It was abolished by Harold Macmillan's Conservative government under the Transport Act 1962 (10 & 11 Eliz. 2. c. 46) and replaced by five successor bodies:

- British Railways Board (railways, hotels and some shipping)
- British Transport Docks Board (docks)
- British Waterways Board (inland waterways)
- London Transport Board (London buses and the London Underground)
- Transport Holding Company (remaining interests, in shipping, travel and road transport)

These changes took effect on 1 January 1963. Notwithstanding the abolition of the BTC, the British Transport Police continues to exist, and the BTC heraldic shield is still displayed on the force's badge.

== Legislation ==
The BTC sponsored a number of local acts of Parliament during its existence:

British Transport Commission Order Confirmation Act 1948
- Act of Parliament
- Parliament of the United Kingdom
- Long title: An Act to confirm a Provisional Order under the Private Legislation Procedure (Scotland) Act 1936 relating to the British Transport Commission.
- Citation: 11 & 12 Geo. 6. c. xxi
- Territorial extent: Scotland

Dates
- Royal assent: 30 July 1948
Other legislation
Relates to	Private Legislation Procedure (Scotland) Act 1936

Text of statute as originally enacted

- British Transport Commission Order Confirmation Act 1948 (11 & 12 Geo. 6. c. xxi)
  Authorised construction of three railway bridges, at Thornton, Fife; Oakley, Fife; and Roseburn Street, Edinburgh.

British Transport Commission Act 1949
- Act of Parliament
- Parliament of the United Kingdom
- Long title: An Act to empower the British Transport Commission to construct works and to acquire lands to empower the Mersey Docks and Harbour Board to dispose of certain lands to the Commission to make provision as to the rates dues and charges leviable by the Commission at certain of their docks to authorise the closing for navigation of portions of certain inland waterways to amend in certain respects the River Lee Water Act 1855 as amended by subsequent enactments to extend the time for the compulsory purchase of certain lands the completion of certain works and the exercise of certain powers to confer further powers on the Commission and for other purposes.
- Citation: 12, 13 & 14 Geo. 6. c. xxix
- Territorial extent: England and Wales; Scotland

Dates
- Royal assent: 30 July 1949
Other legislation
Amends	River Lee Water Act 1855

Text of statute as originally enacted

- British Transport Commission Act 1949 (12, 13 & 14 Geo. 6. c. xxix)
  Authorised the widening of the Piccadilly and District lines between North Ealing station and Action North junction; widening the railway between Radford station and Basford station in Nottingham.
  Allowed the British Transport Commission to recover all the parliamentary deposits paid that had been required from any of the undertakings that became part of the commission.
  Created the British Transport Commission Police.
  Closed sections of the Swansea Canal, Monmouthshire Canal, and Aire and Calder Navigation.

British Transport Commission Act 1950
- Act of Parliament
- Parliament of the United Kingdom
- Long title: An Act to empower the British Transport Commission to construct works and to acquire lands; to extend the time for the compulsory purchase of certain lands the completion of certain works and the exercise of certain powers; to confer further powers on the Commission; and for other purposes.
- Citation: 14 Geo. 6. c. liii
- Territorial extent: England and Wales

Dates
- Royal assent: 28 July 1950

- British Transport Commission Act 1950 (14 Geo. 6. c. liii)

British Transport Commission Order Confirmation Act 1951
- Act of Parliament
- Parliament of the United Kingdom
- Long title: An Act to confirm a Provisional Order under the Private Legislation Procedure (Scotland) Act 1936 relating to the British Transport Commission.
- Citation: 14 & 15 Geo. 6. c. xxiii
- Territorial extent: Scotland

Dates
- Royal assent: 1 August 1951
Other legislation
Relates to	Private Legislation Procedure (Scotland) Act 1936

Text of statute as originally enacted

- British Transport Commission Order Confirmation Act 1951 (14 & 15 Geo. 6. c. xxiii)
  Authorised the stopping up of level crossing, the construction of a culvert, and to divert a stream.
  Gave compulsory purchase powers for the extension of a railway depot, and to build a railway turntable.

British Transport Commission Act 1951
- Act of Parliament
- Parliament of the United Kingdom
- Long title: An Act to empower the British Transport Commission to construct works and to acquire lands to revive the powers and extend the time for the construction of certain works to confer further powers on the Commission and for other purposes.
- Citation: 14 & 15 Geo. 6. c. xxxix
- Territorial extent: England and Wales

Dates
- Royal assent: 1 August 1951

Text of statute as originally enacted

- British Transport Commission Act 1951 (14 & 15 Geo. 6. c. xxxix)
  Authorised widening of the Midland Main Line between Radford and Nottingham, widening of the railway between Manchester Exchange and Manchester Victoria, and construction of a new bridge at Langston Harbour.

British Transport Commission Act 1952
- Act of Parliament
- Parliament of the United Kingdom
- Long title: An Act to empower the British Transport Commission to construct works and to acquire lands to provide for the transfer of part of the Nottingham Canal to the corporation of Nottingham and to confer powers on the corporation in regard thereto to extend the time for the completion of a railway and the compulsory purchase of certain lands to confer further powers on the Commission and for other purposes.
- Citation: 15 & 16 Geo. 6 & 1 Eliz. 2. c. xxxiv
- Territorial extent: England and Wales

Dates
- Royal assent: 1 August 1952

Text of statute as originally enacted

- British Transport Commission Act 1952 (15 & 16 Geo. 6 & 1 Eliz. 2. c. xxxiv)

British Transport Commission Order Confirmation Act 1953
- Act of Parliament
- Parliament of the United Kingdom
- Long title: An Act to confirm a Provisional Order under the Private Legislation Procedure (Scotland) Act 1936 relating to the British Transport Commission.
- Citation: 1 & 2 Eliz. 2. c. xx
- Territorial extent: Scotland

Dates
- Royal assent: 14 July 1953
Other legislation
Relates to	Private Legislation Procedure (Scotland) Act 1936

Text of statute as originally enacted

- British Transport Commission Order Confirmation Act 1953 (1 & 2 Eliz. 2. c. xx)
  Authorised diversion of Old Craighall Road for a new bridge across the Edinburgh to Hawick line, and a spur between the Lothian Lines and the Edinburgh to Harwick line.

British Transport Commission Act 1953
- Act of Parliament
- Parliament of the United Kingdom
- Long title: An Act to empower the British Transport Commission to construct works and to acquire lands to authorise the closing for navigation of portions of certain inland waterways to revive the powers and extend the time for the construction of certain works and to extend the time for the compulsory purchase of certain lands to confer further powers on the Commission and for other purposes.
- Citation: 1 & 2 Eliz. 2. c. xlii
- Territorial extent: England and Wales

Dates
- Royal assent: 31 July 1953

Text of statute as originally enacted

- British Transport Commission Act 1953 (1 & 2 Eliz. 2. c. xlii)

British Transport Commission Order Confirmation Act 1954
- Act of Parliament
- Parliament of the United Kingdom
- Long title: An Act to confirm a Provisional Order under the Private Legislation Procedure (Scotland) Act 1936 relating to the British Transport Commission.
- Citation: 2 & 3 Eliz. 2. c. xxx
- Territorial extent: Scotland

Dates
- Royal assent: 30 July 1954
Other legislation
Relates to	Private Legislation Procedure (Scotland) Act 1936

- British Transport Commission Order Confirmation Act 1954 (2 & 3 Eliz. 2. c. xxx)

British Transport Commission Act 1954
- Act of Parliament
- Parliament of the United Kingdom
- Long title: An Act to empower the British Transport Commission to construct works and to acquire lands to authorise the closing for navigation of portions of certain inland waterways to extend the time for the compulsory purchase of certain lands to confer further powers on the Commission to dissolve the Norwich Omnibus Company and for other purposes.
- Citation: 2 & 3 Eliz. 2. c. lv
- Territorial extent: England and Wales

Dates
- Royal assent: 30 July 1954

Text of statute as originally enacted

- British Transport Commission Act 1954 (2 & 3 Eliz. 2. c. lv)

British Transport Commission Order Confirmation Act 1955
- Act of Parliament
- Parliament of the United Kingdom
- Long title: An Act to confirm a Provisional Order under the Private Legislation Procedure (Scotland) Act 1936 relating to the British Transport Commission.
- Citation: 4 & 5 Eliz. 2. c. i
- Territorial extent: Scotland

Dates
- Royal assent: 6 July 1955
Other legislation
Relates to	Private Legislation Procedure (Scotland) Act 1936

Text of statute as originally enacted

- British Transport Commission Order Confirmation Act 1955 (4 & 5 Eliz. 2. c. i)
  Authorised construction of the Craiglockhart Loop between Slateford Junction on the Edinburgh and Carstairs Line and Craiglockhart Junction on the Edinburgh Suburban Line.

British Transport Commission Act 1955
- Act of Parliament
- Parliament of the United Kingdom
- Long title: An Act to empower the British Transport Commission to construct works and to acquire lands to authorise the closing for navigation of portions of certain inland waterways to extend the time for the compulsory purchase of certain lands and the completion of certain works to confer further powers on the Commission to authorise the deposit with the Commission of capital moneys of the London Transport (Administrative and Supervisory) Staff Superannuation Fund and for other purposes.
- Citation: 4 & 5 Eliz. 2. c. xxx
- Territorial extent: England and Wales

Dates
- Royal assent: 21 December 1955

Text of statute as originally enacted

- British Transport Commission Act 1955 (4 & 5 Eliz. 2. c. xxx)
  Authorised construction of the Victoria line between Victoria station and Walthamstow Central station.
  Closed sections of the River Ure Navigation (Ripon Canal), Lancaster Canal, Ashton Canal, Birmingham Canal Navigations (Ocker Hill Branch, Bloomfield to Deepfields Old Canal, Rotton Brunt Shortening, Churchbridge Locks), Staffordshire and Worcestershire Canal (Hatherton Branch), and Dudley Canal (Bumble Hole Branch)

British Transport Commission Act 1956
- Act of Parliament
- Parliament of the United Kingdom
- Long title: An Act to empower the British Transport Commission to construct works and to acquire lands; to make provision with respect to the River Kennet Navigation and the Kennet and Avon Canal; to authorise the closing for navigation of certain inland waterways and the supply of water from the Lancaster Canal; to transfer a light railway to the Admiralty; to extend the time for the compulsory purchase of certain lands and the completion of certain works; to confer further powers on the Commission; and for other purposes.
- Citation: 4 & 5 Eliz. 2. c. lxxiv
- Territorial extent: England and Wales

Dates
- Royal assent: 2 August 1956

- British Transport Commission Act 1956 (4 & 5 Eliz. 2. c. lxxiv)

British Transport Commission Act 1957
- Act of Parliament
- Parliament of the United Kingdom
- Long title: An Act to empower the British Transport Commission to construct works and to acquire lands to authorise the closing for navigation of portions of certain inland waterways to make provision with respect to the transfer to the corporation of Bristol of Portishead Pier to authorise the sale to the Lincolnshire Road Car Company Limited of part of the churchyard of Saint Mark Lincoln to extend the time for the compulsory purchase of certain lands and the completion of a certain work to confer further powers on the Commission to dissolve the Dundalk Newry and Greenore Railway Company and for other purposes.
- Citation: 5 & 6 Eliz. 2. c. xxxiii
- Territorial extent: England and Wales

Dates
- Royal assent: 31 July 1957

Text of statute as originally enacted

- British Transport Commission Act 1957 (5 & 6 Eliz. 2. c. xxxiii)

British Transport Commission Order Confirmation Act 1957
- Act of Parliament
- Parliament of the United Kingdom
- Long title: An Act to confirm a Provisional Order under the Private Legislation Procedure (Scotland) Act 1936 relating to the British Transport Commission.
- Citation: 6 & 7 Eliz. 2. c. ii
- Territorial extent: Scotland

Dates
- Royal assent: 19 December 1957
Other legislation
Relates to	Private Legislation Procedure (Scotland) Act 1936

- British Transport Commission Order Confirmation Act 1957 (6 & 7 Eliz. 2. c. ii)
  Authorised a deviation of the Glasgow–Edinburgh via Falkirk line to allow the Summerhill viaduct to be replaced.

British Transport Commission Order Confirmation Act 1958
- Act of Parliament
- Parliament of the United Kingdom
- Long title: An Act to confirm a Provisional Order under the Private Legislation Procedure (Scotland) Act 1936 relating to the British Transport Commission.
- Citation: 6 & 7 Eliz. 2. c. xxviii
- Territorial extent: Scotland

Dates
- Royal assent: 23 July 1958
Other legislation
Relates to	Private Legislation Procedure (Scotland) Act 1936

- British Transport Commission Order Confirmation Act 1958 (6 & 7 Eliz. 2. c. xxviii)

British Transport Commission Act 1958
- Act of Parliament
- Parliament of the United Kingdom
- Long title: An Act to empower the British Transport Commission to construct works and to acquire lands to provide for the transfer of the Haddiscoe New Cut to the East Suffolk and Norfolk River Board and to confer powers on the river board and on the Great Yarmouth Port and Haven Commissioners and their statutory committees in relation thereto to extend the time for the compulsory purchase of certain lands to confer further powers on the Commission and for other purposes.
- Citation: 6 & 7 Eliz. 2. c. xliv
- Territorial extent: England and Wales

Dates
- Royal assent: 1 August 1958

Text of statute as originally enacted

- British Transport Commission Act 1958 (6 & 7 Eliz. 2. c. xliv)

British Transport Commission Order Confirmation Act 1959
- Act of Parliament
- Parliament of the United Kingdom
- Long title: An Act to confirm a Provisional Order under the Private Legislation Procedure (Scotland) Act 1936 relating to the British Transport Commission.
- Citation: 7 & 8 Eliz. 2. c. xxxvi
- Territorial extent: Scotland

Dates
- Royal assent: 29 July 1959
Other legislation
Relates to	Private Legislation Procedure (Scotland) Act 1936

- British Transport Commission Order Confirmation Act 1959 (7 & 8 Eliz. 2. c. xxxvi)
  Authorised the reconstruction of five bridges carrying roads over railways in Scotland.

British Transport Commission Act 1959
- Act of Parliament
- Parliament of the United Kingdom
- Long title: An Act to empower the British Transport Commission to construct works and to acquire lands and the Liverpool Corporation to defray the cost of certain works to authorise the closing for navigation of ports of certain inland waterways to repeal and amend certain enactments relating to Holyhead Harbour to authorise the Commission to guarantee loans to certain pilotage authorities to make provision in respect of certain charges in connection with the undertaking of the Fishguard and Rosslare Railways and Harbours Company to extend the time for the compulsory purchase of certain lands to confer further powers on the Commission and for other purposes.
- Citation: 7 & 8 Eliz. 2. c. xliv
- Territorial extent: England and Wales

Dates
- Royal assent: 29 July 1959

Text of statute as originally enacted

- British Transport Commission Act 1959 (7 & 8 Eliz. 2. c. xliv)
  Authorised widening of a railway bridge at Walmer, Kent; widening of the railway at Redhill; a deviation of the Southampton and Dorchester railway to allow the viaduct over the River Test to be rebuilt; construction of a length of railway at Seamer, Yorkshire; deviation of a length of railway at Lamesley to allow the Smithy Lane road bridge to be reconstructed; conversion of part of Woolley Tunnels on the Hallam Line into a cutting; construction of a length of railway at Colchester; conversion of part of the King's Cross Gasworks Tunnel into a cutting, with a bridge to carry Goods Way and an aqueduct to carry the Regent's Canal across the railway; a slipway at Fishbourne, Isle of Wight; jetties at Holyhead; and construction of a railway at Blaenau-Ffestiniog for access to the new Trawsfynydd nuclear power station.
  Closed sections of the Birmingham Canal Navigations (Bloomfield to Deepfields Old Canal), and Kensington Canal
  Gave compulsory purchase powers for land for Tyne Yard railway depot and Healey Mills Marshalling Yard.

British Transport Commission Act 1960
- Act of Parliament
- Parliament of the United Kingdom
- Long title: An Act to empower the British Transport Commission to construct works and to acquire lands to confirm an agreement between the Commission and the National Trust for Places of Historic Interest or Natural Beauty relating to the Stratford-on-Avon Canal to extend the period during which legal proceedings in respect of the River Kennet Navigation and the Kennet and Avon Canal are restricted to authorise the closing for navigation of portions of certain canals to extend the time for the compulsory purchase of certain lands to confer further powers on the Commission and for other purposes.
- Citation: 8 & 9 Eliz. 2. c. xlvii
- Territorial extent: England and Wales

Dates
- Royal assent: 29 July 1960

Text of statute as originally enacted

- British Transport Commission Act 1960 (8 & 9 Eliz. 2. c. xlvii)
  Authorised leasing of part of the Stratford-on-Avon Canal to the National Trust.
  Closed sections of the Birmingham Canal Navigations (Wednesbury Old Canal, Tipton Green Locks, Oldbury Old Canal), Titford Canal, Dudley Canal (Withymoor Arm), Walsall Canal (Danks Branch) and Stourbridge Canal.
  Removed the duty of the Gravesend–Tilbury Ferry to carry goods and vehicles on the first anniversary of the opening of the Dartford Tunnel.

British Transport Commission Order Confirmation Act 1961
- Act of Parliament
- Parliament of the United Kingdom
- Long title: An Act to confirm a Provisional Order under the Private Legislation Procedure (Scotland) Act, 1936, relating to the British Transport Commission.
- Citation: 9 & 10 Eliz. 2. c. xvii
- Territorial extent: Scotland

Dates
- Royal assent: 19 July 1961
Other legislation
Relates to	Private Legislation Procedure (Scotland) Act 1936

Text of statute as originally enacted

- British Transport Commission Order Confirmation Act 1961 (9 & 10 Eliz. 2. c. xvii)
  Authorised the construction of a short length of railway near Motherwell.

British Transport Commission (No. 2) Order Confirmation Act 1961
- Act of Parliament
- Parliament of the United Kingdom
- Long title: An Act to confirm a Provisional Order under the Private Legislation Procedure (Scotland) Act, 1936, relating to the British Transport Commission.
- Citation: 9 & 10 Eliz. 2. c. xxxiii
- Territorial extent: Scotland

Dates
- Royal assent: 27 July 1961
Other legislation
Relates to	Private Legislation Procedure (Scotland) Act 1936

Text of statute as originally enacted

- British Transport Commission (No. 2) Order Confirmation Act 1961 (9 & 10 Eliz. 2. c. xxxiii)
  Authorised the closing of Alloa Harbour.

British Transport Commission Act 1961
- Act of Parliament
- Parliament of the United Kingdom
- Long title: An Act to empower the British Transport Commission to construct works and to acquire lands, to authorise the closing to navigation of portions of certain canals, to enact schemes for the redevelopment of parts of the Ashton Canal and the Dearne and Dove Canal, to extend the time for the compulsory purchase of certain lands and the completion of certain works, to confer further powers on the Commission, and for other purposes.
- Citation: 9 & 10 Eliz. 2. c. xxxvi
- Territorial extent: England and Wales

Dates
- Royal assent: 27 July 1961

Text of statute as originally enacted

- British Transport Commission Act 1961 (9 & 10 Eliz. 2. c. xxxvi)
  Authorised the widening of the District and Circle lines between Aldgate and Tower Hill stations, new track at Barbican station, and a new jetty at Immingham Docks.
  Closed sections of the Ashton Canal (Hollinwood Branch), Birmingham Canal Navigations (Bentley Canal, Bloomfield to Deepfields Old Canal, Rotton Brunt Shortening, Bradley Locks), Dearne and Dove Canal, Lancaster Canal, Manchester, Bolton and Bury Canal, and Walsall Canal (Anson Branch).

British Transport Commission Act 1962 (Note: Section 1(1).)
- Act of Parliament
- Parliament of the United Kingdom
- Long title: An Act to empower the British Transport Commission to construct works and to acquire lands, to authorise the closing to navigation of portions of certain waterways, to extend the time for the compulsory purchase of certain lands and the completion of certain works, to confer further powers on the Commission; and for other purposes.
- Citation: 10 & 11 Eliz. 2. c. xlii
- Territorial extent: United Kingdom

Dates
- Royal assent: 1 August 1962
- Commencement: 1 August 1962 (Note: The Acts of Parliament (Commencement) Act 1793.)
Other legislation
Amended by	Criminal Justice Act 1972; Anti-terrorism, Crime and Security Act 2001

Status: Amended

Text of statute as originally enacted

- British Transport Commission Act 1962 (10 & 11 Eliz. 2. c. xlii)
  Authorised new subways at Oxford Circus and London Bridge station, ventilation shafts for the London Underground, and a deviation of the West Coast Main Line at the Harecastle Railway Tunnel.
  Closed sections of the Aire and Calder Navigation (River Calder, Foxholes Lock), Ashton Canal (Stockport Branch), Chesterfield Canal, Cromford Canal, Dudley Canal, Erewash Canal, Grand Union Canal (Old Stratford Cut, Buckingham Arm), Grand Western Canal, Huddersfield Narrow Canal, Huddersfield Broad Canal, Monmouthshire and Brecon Canal, Brecon and Abergavenny Canal, Regent's Canal (City Road Basin), Swansea Canal, Trent and Mersey Canal (Burslem Arm), and Weaver Navigation (channel between Manchester Ship Canal and Weston Canal).

== Chairmen ==
- 1947 – 1953: Sir Cyril Hurcomb
- 1953 – 1961: Gen. Sir Brian Robertson, Bt.
- 1961 – 1965: Dr. Richard Beeching

== See also ==
- Canals of the United Kingdom
- History of the British canal system
- Independent Transport Commission
