= Scottish Waterways Trust =

Registered charity in Scotland

- Predecessor: The Waterways Trust
- Successor: Keep Scotland Beautiful
- Formation: 2000 (as part of The Waterways Trust); 2012 (as an independent charity)
- Dissolved: 2019
- Type: Charitable trust
- Purpose: "By connecting people with the heritage, wildlife and green open spaces of Scotland's canals through innovative projects, SWT inspires people to get active, improve their health and mental well-being, employment prospects and community life."
- Headquarters: Falkirk Wheel, Falkirk
- Region served: Scotland
- Key people: The Prince of Wales (Patron); Ross Martin CBE (Chairman of the Board of Trustees)
- Main organ: Board of Trustees
- Website: www.scottishwaterwaystrust.org.uk

The Scottish Waterways Trust was an independent registered charity, established as part of The Waterways Trust in 2000. In 2012 The Waterways Trust merged its operations in England and Wales with the Canal & River Trust, and the organisation in Scotland became an independent charity.

== Foundation ==
In 2009, sailing and marine activities in Scotland were in relatively good health despite the 2008 financial crisis and the Great Recession, but the British Waterways Trust was already consulting about changing from being under state control to trust arrangements. Responsibility for Scotland's inland waterways is a devolved issue and British Waterways Scotland received grant funding from the Scottish Government, with two members of the board being appointed by Scottish ministers. The formal separation of responsibility for Scottish waterways from that for England and Wales was described at the time as "mak[ing] for very challenging times".

== Projects ==
The Trust set up the Canal College skills training programme in Falkirk and Edinburgh for young people aged 16-25 years of age which ran 2013–2015, which had helped 162 participants by February 2016. It was recognised as an innovative scheme with a positive impact. The Canal College 2 was a larger programme based in Inverness which launched in 2017 to run for a period three years. This initiative provided education and training in canal skills to unemployed young people. The first participants completed the scheme later that year. Previously Waterways Trust Scotland had been involved in smaller scale project work in the Falkirk area to increase employability.

The Trust organised volunteers to clear and maintain canals. It helped teach volunteers some traditional lock-keeping skills and built heritage skills. It worked on regeneration projects and tourism and heritage. It supported an art exhibition on the theme of canals.

The Trust carried out research into the benefits of the Scottish canal network.

== End of the Trust ==
In March 2019 the charity disclosed that it faced a severe financial situation and was to be making employees redundant. Within a couple of months there was confirmation that the charity had ceased to operate, with some of their activities, including the canal college and Canal Heritage work to be taken forward by environmental charity, Keep Scotland Beautiful.

== See also ==
- List of waterway societies in the United Kingdom
