= National Waterways Museum =

Museum in Cheshire, England

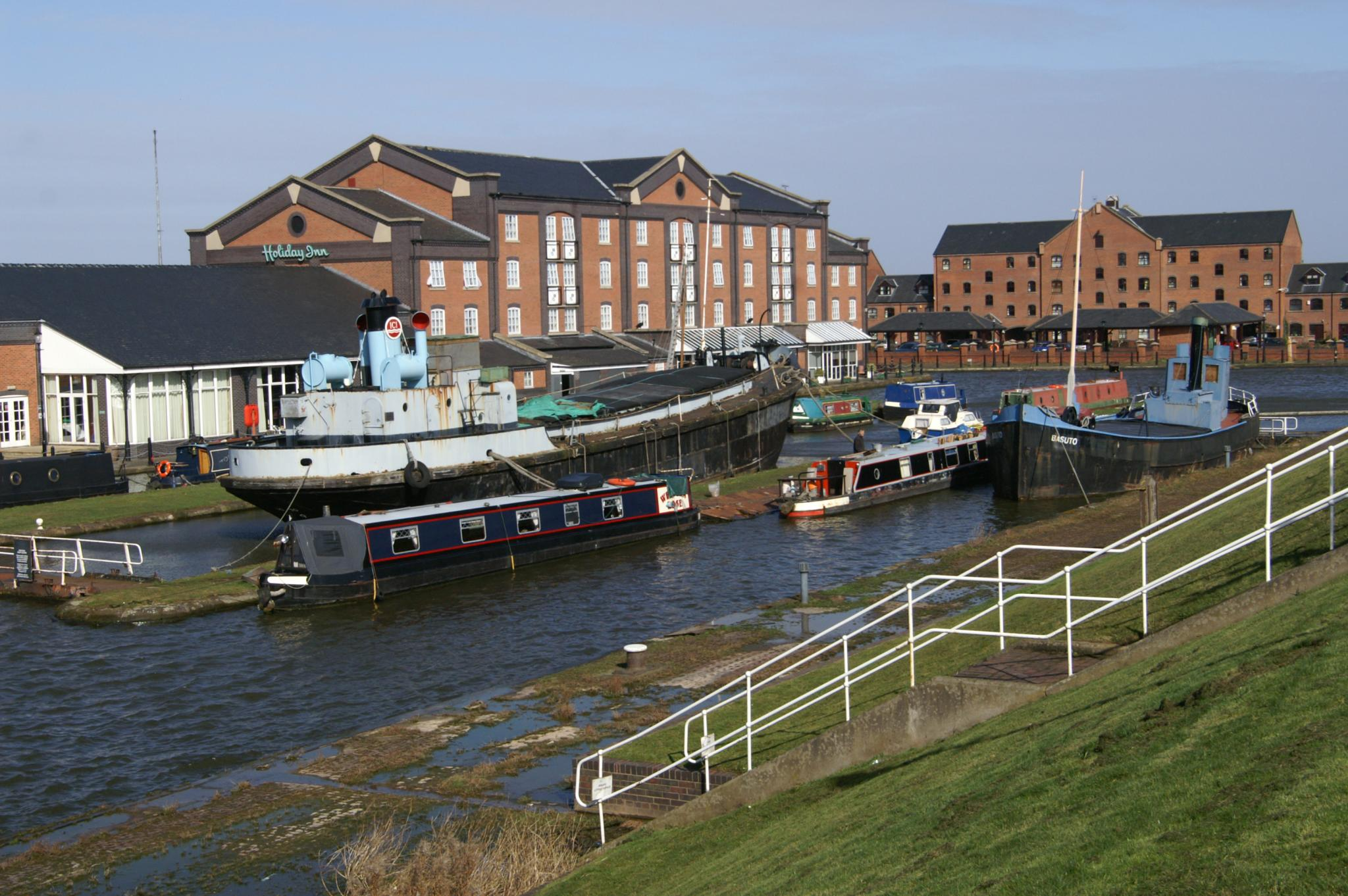
- National Waterways Museum

- Location within Cheshire
- Former name: National Waterways Museum at Ellesmere Port; The Boat Museum; North West Museum of Inland Navigation
- Established: 1970s
- Location: Ellesmere Port, Cheshire, England
- Coordinates: 53.288°N 2.892°W
- Owner: The Canal & River Trust
- Website: National Waterways Museum

The National Waterways Museum (NWM) is a transport museum, at Ellesmere Port in the English county of Cheshire, which concentrates on the history of Britain's navigable inland waterways. Until 2010, the Waterways Trust operated three sites, including this one, under the name National Waterways Museum. In that year, the site at Gloucester was renamed the Gloucester Waterways Museum and the site at Stoke Bruerne became The Canal Museum.

The Ellesmere Port museum is situated at the northern end of the Shropshire Union Canal where it meets the Manchester Ship Canal (grid reference SJ406771). The NWM's collections and archives focus on the Britain's navigable inland waterways, including its rivers and canals, and include canal boats, traditional clothing, painted canal decorative ware and tools. It is one of several museums and attractions operated by the Canal & River Trust, the successor to The Waterways Trust.

== History ==
=== Industrial age ===
The NWM site occupies the former Netherpool port that was designed by Thomas Telford, under the direction of William Jessop, for the ill-fated Ellesmere Canal. The proposed waterway in England and Wales was planned to carry commercial traffic between the rivers Mersey and Severn. The NWM's historic buildings are all that remain of the inland port that transferred goods and cargo from narrowboats onto rivercraft that would then sail to the docks at Liverpool. The northern section of the Ellesmere Canal, which was built as a 10 mi (16 km) contour canal, connected Netherpool port to Chester Canal in 1797. When it opened, its revenue was expected to help fund the rest of the Ellesmere Canal project. However, by 1805 work had stalled because of rising costs and the failure to generate the expected income from commercial boat traffic. The plans to build the remaining southern section to the Shrewsbury Canal and the connection between Pontcysyllte and Chester were abandoned.

For the next 40 years, the 7 acres (3 ha) port served boats using the Chester Canal until it was taken over by the Shropshire Union Railways and Canal Company in 1845. It amalgamated the former stretches of Ellesmere Canal, along with Eastern and Western branches of the Montgomery Canal, the Shrewsbury Canal and the Shropshire Canal into the Shropshire Union Canal. The port at Netherpool remained in operation until it was finally closed in the 1950s.

=== Waterways museum ===
A museum, which was called the North West Museum of Inland Navigation, was founded at the disused port in the 1970s. It was later renamed The Boat Museum and then, until 2012, the National Waterways Museum at Ellesmere Port. In the 1990s, The Waterways Trust took on the management of the National Waterways Museum. Funding from the Heritage Lottery Fund helped create new displays and improve visitor facilities. In 2012, the Waterways Trust became part of the newly-formed Canal & River Trust.

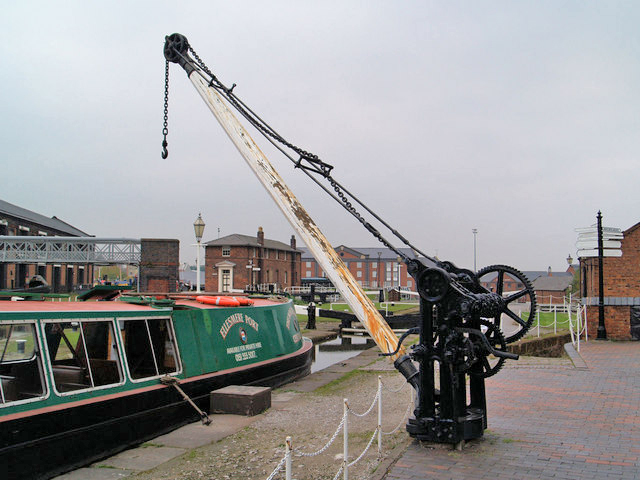
Crane at the National Waterways Museum

The name "National Waterways Museum" was formerly used to include the inland waterways collection at two other museum sites in England, which are now named the Gloucester Waterways Museum in Gloucester, and The Canal Museum in Stoke Bruerne, Northamptonshire.

=== Funding ===
The NWM is entrusted with a collection that has the status of a designated collection, as determined by the Museums, Libraries and Archives Council. However, the standard of collection management has been the subject of considerable concern and criticism in the waterways press because, essentially, the NWM has insufficient money to fund the upkeep of the many historic boats in the collection. Unlike the National Railway Museum, which receives funding direct from HM Government, the NWM only receives public money through the Canal & River Trust, previously British Waterways. During the winter of 2008–2009, opening hours were cut at Gloucester and Ellesmere Port to just two days per week in an effort to manage a tough financial situation. Some boats were advertised in Museums Journal early in 2009 for disposal, there being insufficient money for their restoration. Visitors to the Ellesmere Port site can see boats, in the care of a national museum, sunken into the water or kept afloat by automatic pumps. However, the initiative to create a heritage boatyard, with lottery and other funding, has spurred a revival in the NWM's fortunes and work on addressing the areas of maintenance is now taking place. The heritage boatyard trains young people in skills that might otherwise be lost. Two boats, Ilkeston and Ferret, are sponsored by the London Canal Museum, which contributes annually to the cost of their maintenance.

== Collections ==
The NWM incorporates all surviving parts of the original industrial port. Over the past 40 years, the historic site has been restored. This includes the locks, docks and warehouses and a pump and engine room. A toll house was built in 1805 and the Island Warehouse was built in 1871 to store grain.

The Island Warehouse has an exhibition on the history of boat-building and another describing the social history of canals. The Pump House contains the steam-driven pumping engines which supplied power for the hydraulic cranes and the capstans which were used around the dock, and the Power Hall contains a variety of other engines. The blacksmith's forge was where the ironwork for the canal and its boats was made. A resident blacksmith works in the forge. The stables which housed the horses and pigs are still present. The former toll house hosts temporary and touring exhibitions. The Waterways Archive contains a wide range of material relating to waterways in Britain and abroad. A terrace of four houses known as Porter's Row contains dock workers' cottages which have been decorated and furnished to represent different periods from the 1840s to the 1950s. The NWM contains a collection of historic boats. Short boat trips along the Shropshire Union Canal are arranged. The NWM is open at advertised times throughout the year.

The locks within the NWM site are designated by English Heritage as Grade II listed buildings. Also listed at Grade II are the lighthouse at the entry of the canal into the Mersey, and a lock keeper's hut.

== Television ==
In 2010, the NWM was one of three featured on Richard Macer's BBC Four series Behind the Scenes at the Museum.

In 2020, the NWM featured as the start point of series two of Robbie Cumming's Canal Boat Diaries on BBC One. The episode travels along the Shropshire Union from the NWM to Audlem.

In 2025, the NWM was featured in the Channel 4 documentary series Narrow Escapes, which highlights the lives of people living and working on the UK’s inland waterways. The museum appears as part of a segment exploring the preservation of historic canal boats and the community that supports the canal network.

== See also ==
- Gloucester Waterways Museum
- The Canal Museum
- London Canal Museum
- J. H. Taylor & Sons
- The Daniel Adamson
