= J. H. Taylor & Sons =

J. H. Taylor & Sons was an English company that primarily built wooden canal boats on the Shropshire Union Canal at Tower Wharf, Chester. Joseph Harry Taylor set up the business with his son Wilfred in 1914 in the Dee Basin. The company was in Wilfred's name as his father was an undischarged bankrupt. During this time the company built and repaired an array of water craft from traditional Dee skiffs and salmon fishing boats to passenger launches, narrow boats and tugs. Joseph Harry died in 1924 and his sons carried on the business until 1970.

== Overview ==
Today, J. H. Taylor boats are largely remembered for their pleasure boats built for the inland waterways of the United Kingdom. The first boat of this series was commissioned by the Manchester Ship Canal Company. The boats were constructed using a round bilge style with mahogany on oak frames. The beam of the vessels is 6 ft. 11in., allowing the boats to pass through all locks on the canal system of England and Wales. The boats were not cheap to build. An invoice for the Canal Cruiser 'Ottilie' dated 31 October 1957 states a final cost including all fittings and labour came to £1924.12. The number of hours labour in the invoice was as follows; journeymen – 6077½ hours; apprentice – 456 hours.

== Preservation ==
Some of the boats can still be seen on the Canals of the United Kingdom and one boat is held at the National Waterways Museum, Ellesmere Port.
