= Daniel Adamson (boat) =

Historic steam-powered tug-boat

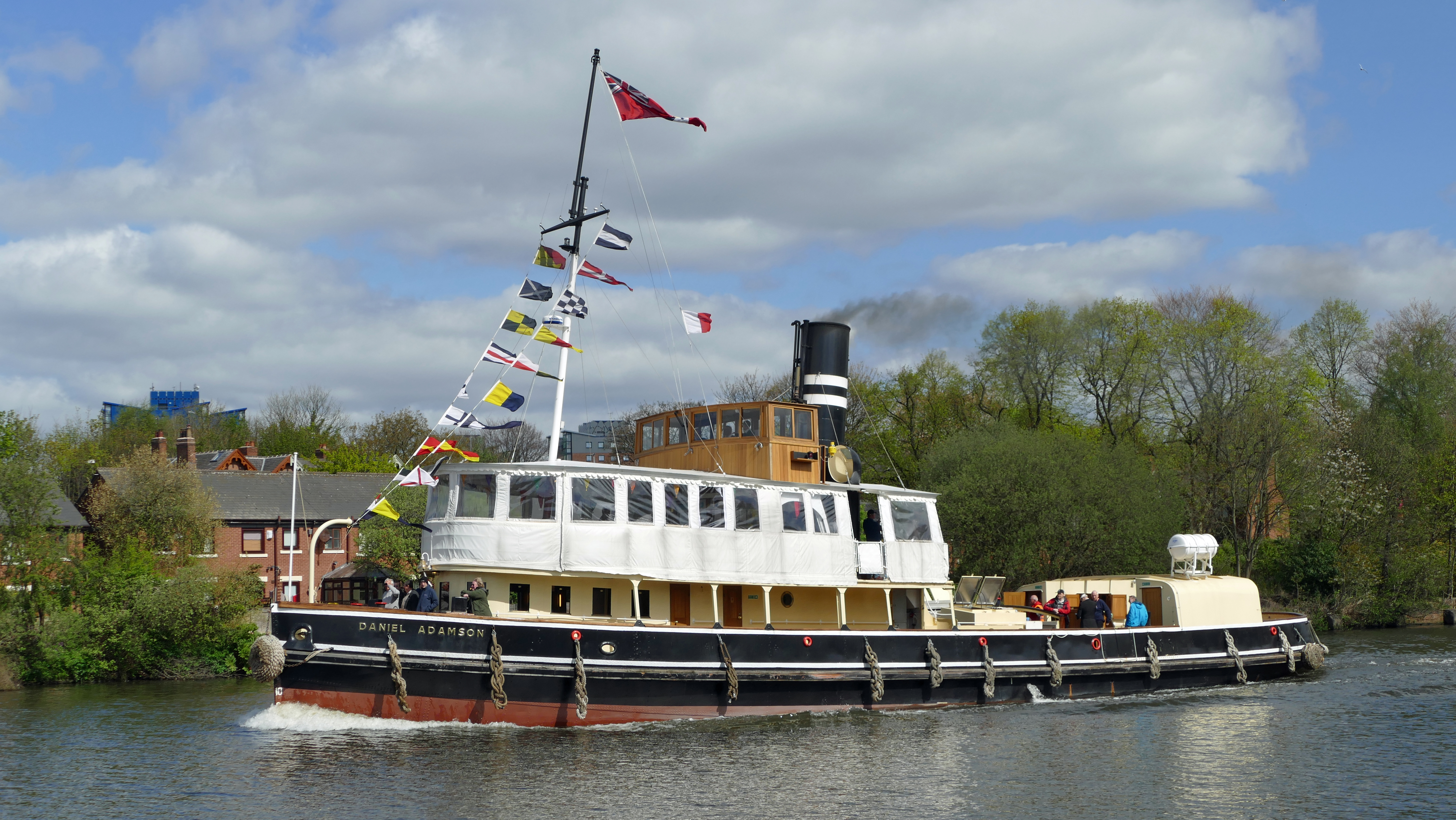
The Danny on the Manchester Ship Canal

The Daniel Adamson also known as The Danny is a historic steam-powered tugboat.

== History ==
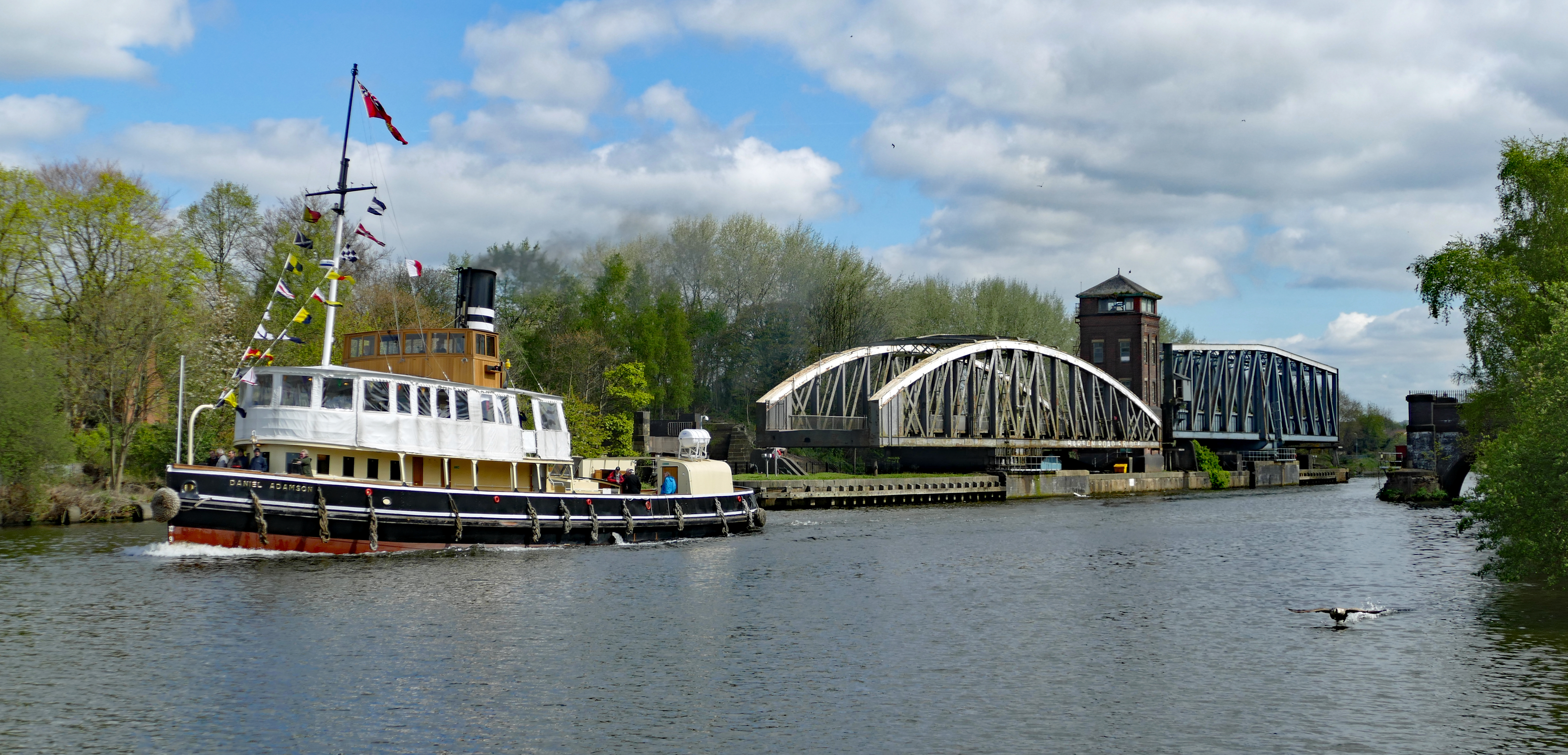
The Danny passing the Barton Swing Aqueduct

The boat was built as a tug-tender in 1903 for the Shropshire Union Canal Company and named the Ralph Brocklebank. Between 1903 and 1915 it towed barges, and carried passengers, along the Mersey, thereafter it only towed freight. The boat was bought by the Manchester Ship Canal Company in 1921 and used as a tug, however it was also operated as a cruise boat between Manchester and Eastham that included a return train-trip from Ellesmere Port to Manchester.

In 1936 it was converted into a luxury passenger vessel and renamed after the first chairman of the Manchester Ship Canal Company, Daniel Adamson.

In 1986 the boat was at the National Waterways Museum in Ellesmere Port. By 2004 the boat was in disrepair and under threat of being scrapped, a rescue plan was initiated that resulted in a £3 million award from The National Lottery that enabled The Danny to return to service as a cruise boat.

== Construction ==
The Danny was built in 1903 by the Tranmere Bay Development Co, of Birkenhead. It is propelled by a coal powered steam engine. It has a beam of 7.47m, a depth of 1.83m, a length of 33.53m and has a gross tonnage of 173.

== Listing ==
The Danny has been listed on the UK's national register of historic ships.

== Usage ==
Since 2017 The Danny has operated as a cruise boat along the Manchester Ship Canal.
