= The Canal Museum =

Museum in Northamptonshire, England

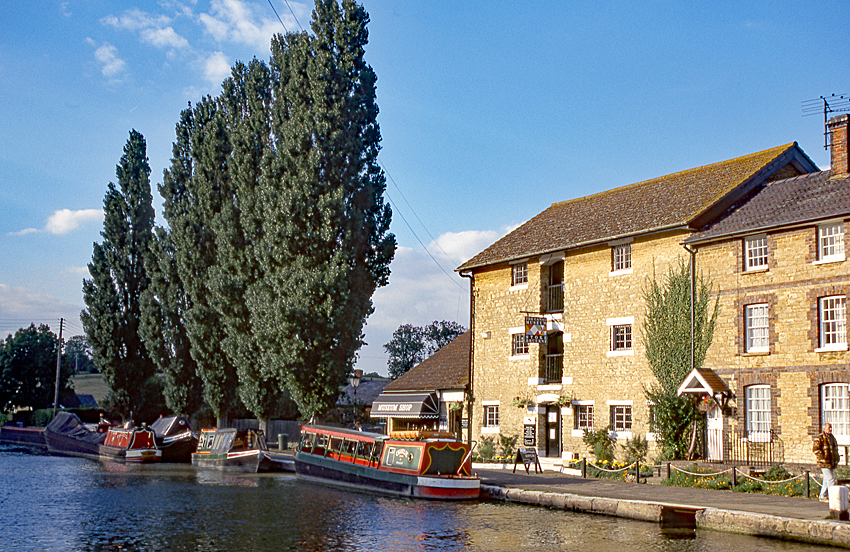
- Canal Museum at Stoke Bruerne

- Location within Northamptonshire
- Former names: National Waterways Museum Stoke Bruerne; The Canal Museum at Stoke Bruerne
- Location: Stoke Bruerne
- Coordinates: 52.143°N 0.915°W
- Owner: Canal & River Trust
- Website: canalrivertrust.org.uk/the-canal-museum

The Canal Museum, formerly known as the National Waterways Museum at Stoke Bruerne and The Canal Museum at Stoke Bruerne, is a canal museum located next to the Grand Union Canal just south of the Blisworth Tunnel, near the village of Stoke Bruerne in Northamptonshire. It is about 10 miles (16 km) north of Milton Keynes and 7 miles (11 km) south of Northampton near junction 15 of the M1 motorway.

== History ==
The museum was established in 1963, as "The Canal Museum". It was founded by two canal workers and enthusiasts, Charles N. Hadlow, the first curator, and Jack James, its first caretaker, whose personal collections formed the main part of its initial exhibits.

It was subsequently known as the "National Waterways Museum Stoke Bruerne", one of three museums operated by The Waterways Trust that focused on the history of canals in Britain. After the creation of the Canal & River Trust in 2010, the Stoke Bruerne museum was rebranded to its original name.

== Museum ==
The museum is housed in a restored Grade II listed corn mill at the top of a flight of canal locks, and is one of several museums and attractions operated by the Canal & River Trust, the successor to The Waterways Trust.

The museum tells the story of Britain's inland waterways and the people who worked on them. It provides an insight into the transport system which was fundamental to the Industrial Revolution in Britain. There are working models and 3-D displays including a model of the short-lived inclined-plane mechanical lift at Foxton in Leicestershire. Exhibits include models of working boats including narrow boats, barges, butties and tugs, painted ware and canal crafts, traditional clothing, canal-side signs and specialist tools.

The museum has a shop and café, and a school/activity room available for educational visits.

== See also ==
- London Canal Museum
- National Waterways Museum
- Gloucester Waterways Museum
