= Daniel Adamson =

English engineer (1820–1890)

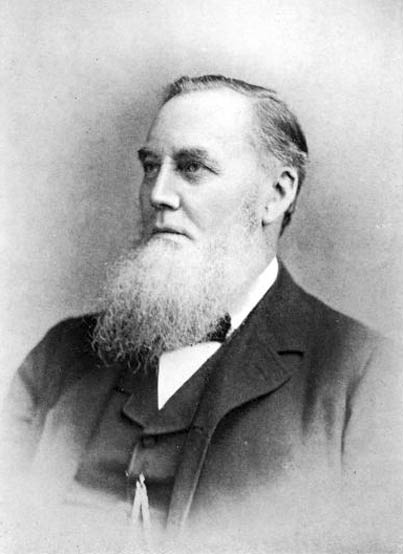
Daniel Adamson, 1880

Daniel Adamson (30 April 1820 – 13 January 1890) was an English engineer who became a successful manufacturer of boilers and was the driving force behind the inception of the Manchester Ship Canal project during the 1880s.

== Early life ==
Adamson was born in Shildon, County Durham, on 30 April 1820. He was the 13th of 15 children – seven boys and eight girls – born to Daniel Adamson, landlord of the Grey Horse public house in Shildon, and his wife, Ann. Adamson was educated at Edward Walton Quaker School, Old Shildon, until the age of thirteen, when he left to become an apprentice to Timothy Hackworth, engineer to the Stockton and Darlington Railway, with whom he went on to serve as a draughtsman and engineer. By 1850, he had risen to become general manager of the Stockton and Darlington engine works (Soho Works, Shildon), and moved to become manager of Heaton Foundry in Stockport.

== Business ==
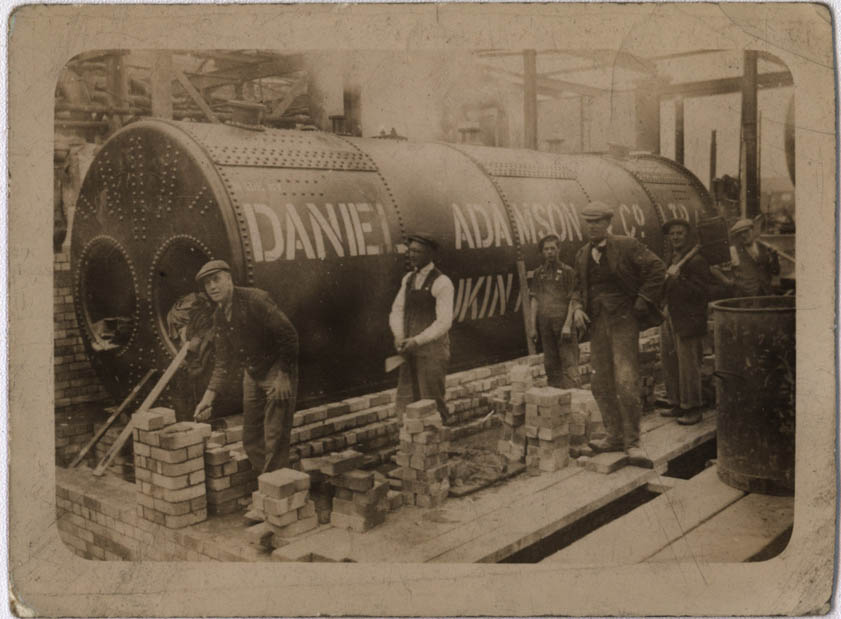
Boiler for an engine made at Daniel Adamson & Co., Dukinfield c. 1900

In 1851 he established a small iron works in Newton, Cheshire, expanding it a year later by building a new foundry called the Newton Moor Iron Works on Muslin Street (now Talbot Road), between Hyde and Dukinfield. He specialised in engine and boiler making, initially following designs created by Hackworth, making and exporting the renowned "Manchester Boilers". Adamson was able to experiment with the newfound wealth from the worldwide export of these boilers which incorporated ring joints in the form of his patented Anti-Collapsive Flange Seam. He was also one of the pioneers of explosive forming used in the foundry process.

In 1872 he designed and built the Daniel Adamson and Co factory, a new premises in Dukinfield next to Dewsnap Farm (off Dewsnap Lane), with its entrance on Johnsonbrook Road. This new works was approximately 1,000 yards (910 m) from the old foundry but the site was large and had enough spare land around it for any planned expansion.

Between 1885 and 1888, Daniel Adamson and Co. supplied four narrow gauge steam locomotives to the Oakeley Quarry in Blaenau Ffestiniog, North Wales.

He improved the design and manufacturing process (pioneering the use of steel and taking out 19 patents in the process) over the 36 years he was involved with boiler and other foundry manufacturing. When he died in 1890 the business employed some 600 people.

Adamson's other business interests included a mill building company in Hyde ('The Newton Moor Spinning Company'), the Yorkshire Steel and Iron Works at Penistone, the Northern Lincolnshire Iron Company at Frodingham near Scunthorpe, and large share-holdings in iron works in Cumberland and South Wales.

== The ship canal project ==
Adamson was a champion of the Manchester Ship Canal project. He arranged a meeting in Didsbury at his home, The Towers, on 27 June 1882, attended by 68 people including the mayors of Manchester and surrounding towns, leaders of commerce and industry, banker and financiers. Also present at the meeting was the canal's eventual designer Edward Leader Williams. Adamson was elected chairman of the provisional committee promoting the ship canal, and was at the forefront in pushing the scheme through Parliament in the face of intense opposition from railway companies and port interests in Liverpool. The requisite Act of Parliament enabling the canal was finally passed on 6 August 1885, after which Adamson became the first chairman of the board of directors of the Manchester Ship Canal Company – a post he held until February 1887. As a result of his resignation, the first sod was cut by his successor, Lord Egerton of Tatton, the following November.

Adamson remained a strong supporter of the project but did not live to see its completion in 1894. He died at home in Didsbury on 13 January 1890. Daniel Adamson and Co remained a family business until 1964, when it was sold to Acrow Engineers Ltd.

== Memorials ==
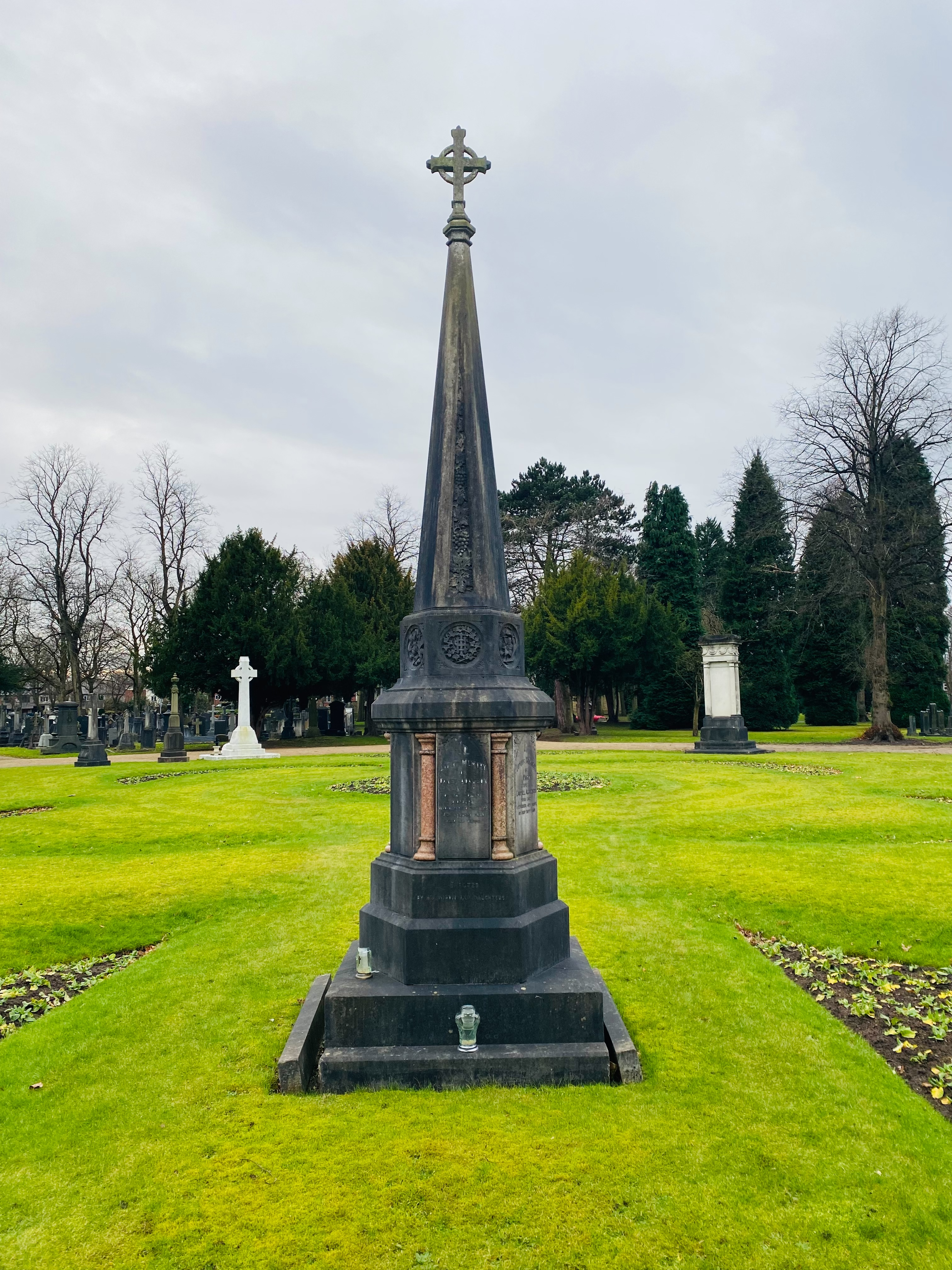
Funerary monument of Daniel Adamson, Southern Cemetery, Manchester

There are blue plaques at The Towers (today the Shirley Institute), Wilmslow Road in Didsbury, and in Adamson Street, Dukinfield. Also in Dukinfield, St Luke's Church has a stained glass window in his memory. The Adamson Military Band was also named after him.

The Daniel Adamson Coach House has been preserved in Shildon.

The former Manchester Ship Canal Company steam-powered tug-tender Daniel Adamson (built in 1903 as Ralph Brocklebank but renamed in 1936) has been restored by the Daniel Adamson Preservation Society and entered passenger-carrying service under steam on 22 April 2017.

Adamson is buried at Southern Cemetery, Manchester, in grave space "A-Church of England-40". He was buried three days after his death at his home in Didsbury, on 16 January 1890.

He was a founder member of the Iron and Steel Institute and served as its president in 1887. He was awarded the institute's Bessemer Gold Medal in 1888 for his work on the properties of iron and steel and the use of steel for steam boilers and other purposes. He was also a Member of the Institution of Civil Engineers, the Cleveland Institution of Engineers, the British Iron Trades Association, the Railway and Canal Traders' Association, the Geological Society of London, the Society of Arts, the Manchester Geographical Society, the Manchester Literary and Philosophical Society, the Manchester Geological Society and others.
