= Canal Boat Diaries =

- Genre: Documentary
- Presented by: Robbie Cumming
- Country of origin: United Kingdom
- Original language: English
- No. of episodes: 47

Production
- Producer: Stuart Woodman
- Running time: 30 minutes (Series 1–4); 60 minutes (with commercials) (Series 5–present)
- Production company: Middlechild

Original release
- Network: BBC Four
- Release: 19 November 2019 – 4 May 2023
- Network: U&Yesterday
- Release: 3 June 2024 – present

Canal Boat Diaries is a travel documentary series presented by Robbie Cumming and created by television producer Stuart Woodman and former BBC executive Tony Parker. The first four series were originally broadcast on BBC Four from 19 November 2019 to 4 May 2023. It was later picked up by UKTV and transmitted on U&Yesterday from series 5 onwards in 2024. The series consists of a continuous video diary that charts narrowboater and videographer Robbie Cumming as he travels around the inland waterways of England and Wales along its canal network on his narrowboat the Naughty Lass, whilst giving an honest look into the highs and lows of everyday life on the canals.

The series featured Cumming exploring Britain's lesser-known waterways, whilst along the way visiting towns and villages, pubs, landmarks, picturesque landscapes and taking a look at local history.

Episodes are filmed primarily on iPhones and a series of Go-Pro cameras, largely maintaining the style and natural immediacy of earlier YouTube videos. Each episode takes between 5 and 10 days to film using a small crew, with drone filming of towpaths and waterways undertaken by Halo-Vue with permission from the Canal & River Trust.

== Background ==
In the winter of 2012/13, Cumming was approached by his school friend Sam Martin to house-sit and look after her narrowboat, which she was trying to sell at the time; he was allowed to live there rent-free as long as he kept it well-maintained and on the move. Cumming fell in love with life on the canals, and two years later he purchased a narrowboat, which he called The Naughty Lass after a pun on The Nautilus from the novel Twenty Thousand Leagues under the Sea by Jules Verne. Whilst trying to hold down a job working from home, in his spare time he set up the YouTube channel Robbie Cumming's Voyage Logs and filmed his travels, which became popular and amassed a substantial following. Cumming was subsequently approached by producer Stuart Woodman, who admired the strength and authenticity of his storytelling. He proposed to adapt the concept into a television series, which was commissioned as a five-part travel documentary series by the BBC in 2019.

The first four series, with 30 minute episodes, were produced by the BBC. In October 2023 it was announced that UKTV had purchased the rights to the series. The episodes were expanded to fit a longer 60-minute slot over a 10-episode series developed by production company Middlechild. The fifth series saw Cumming explore Birmingham's extensive Canal Navigations, visiting the village of Braunston, widely considered the spiritual home for narrowboaters due to the location of All Saints Church, otherwise known as 'the cathedral of the canals', before proceeding to travel south down the Grand Union Canal. In 2024, a sixth series was commissioned, which followed Cumming as he explored the waterways of southern England. The series concluded with a visit to the Regent's Canal, where his passion for canals began. In the seventh and latest series Cumming travelled from west to east, visiting Wales for the first time while journeying along the Llangollen Canal: crossing the border he tackled his way through the Shropshire Union, before weaving through the waterways of Lancashire along the Peak District, ultimately facing the Rochdale Canal, otherwise known as the 'everest of the canals', where he proceeded to climb through all 92 locks before ending his journey in West Yorkshire.

== Episodes ==
=== Series overview ===
Series	Episodes	Originally released	
Series	Episodes	First released	Last released
1	5	19 November 2019	26 November 2019
2	4	5 April 2021	8 April 2021
3	4	14 March 2022	17 March 2022
4	4	1 May 2023	4 May 2023
5	10	3 June 2024	14 June 2024
6	10	19 May 2025	19 May 2025
7	10	18 May 2026	18 May 2026

=== Series 1 (2019) ===
No. overall	No. in series	Title	Original release date
1	1	"Shardlow to Stoke-on-Trent"	19 November 2019
2	2	"Froghall to Bugsworth Basin"	20 November 2019
3	3	"Marple to Huddersfield"	21 November 2019
4	4	"Sowerby Bridge to Manchester"	25 November 2019
5	5	"Manchester to Liverpool"	26 November 2019

=== Series 2 (2021) ===
No. overall	No. in series	Title	Original release date
6	1	"Ellesmere Port to Audlem"	5 April 2021
7	2	"Market Drayton to Stourport-on-Severn"	6 April 2021
8	3	"Stourport Basins to Kingswood Junction"	7 April 2021
9	4	"Stratford upon Avon to Birmingham"	8 April 2021

=== Series 3 (2022) ===
No. overall	No. in series	Title	Original release date
10	1	"Wigan to Burnley"	14 March 2022
11	2	"Barrowford to Bingley"	15 March 2022
12	3	"Dowley Gap to Ferrybridge"	16 March 2022
13	4	"Knottingley to Ripon"	17 March 2022

=== Series 4 (2023) ===
No. overall	No. in series	Title	Original release date
14	1	"Sheffield to Keadby"	1 May 2023
15	2	"Keadby to Kiveton Park"	2 May 2023
16	3	"Lincoln to Nottingham"	3 May 2023
17	4	"Loughborough to Braunston"	4 May 2023

=== Series 5 (2024) ===
No. overall	No. in series	Title	Original release date
18	1	"Braunston to Lapworth"	3 June 2024
19	2	"Yardley Wood to Netherton Tunnel"	4 June 2024
20	3	"Hawne Basin to Stourbridge"	5 June 2024
21	4	"Stourton to Wolverhampton"	6 June 2024
22	5	"Wolverhampton to Anglesey Basin"	7 June 2024
23	6	"Great Barr to Atherstone"	10 June 2024
24	7	"Atherstone to Moira"	11 June 2024
25	8	"Coventry to Weedon Bec"	12 June 2024
26	9	"Bugbrooke to Milton Keynes"	13 June 2024
27	10	"Simpson to Little Tring"	14 June 2024

=== Series 6 (2025) ===
No. overall	No. in series	Title	Original release date
28	1	"Napton Junction to Aynho Wharf"	19 May 2025
29	2	"Aynho Wharf to Bablock Hythe"	19 May 2025
30	3	"Oxford to Reading"	19 May 2025
31	4	"Reading to Windsor"	19 May 2025
32	5	"Windsor to Godalming"	19 May 2025
33	6	"Byfleet to Odiham Castle"	19 May 2025
34	7	"Weybridge to Stonebridge Park"	19 May 2025
35	8	"Harlesden to Stratford"	19 May 2025
36	9	"Cowley to Hunton Bridge"	19 May 2025
37	10	"Hunton Bridge to Aylesbury"	19 May 2025

=== Series 7 (2026) ===
No. overall	No. in series	Title	Original release date
38	1	"Llangollen to Crickheath"	18 May 2026
39	2	"Frankton Junction to Grindley Brook"	18 May 2026
40	3	"Grindley Brook to Middlewich"	18 May 2026
41	4	"Winsford to Weston Point"	18 May 2026
42	5	"Runcorn to Middlewich"	18 May 2026
43	6	"Middlewich to Hall Green"	18 May 2026
44	7	"Scholar Green to High Lane"	18 May 2026
45	8	"High Lane to Manchester"	18 May 2026
46	9	"Manchester to Summit"	18 May 2026
47	10	"Summit to Sowerby Bridge"	18 May 2026

== Reception ==
The series has generally received critical praise. Cumming has been affectionately described as the 'Canal Man', building a loyal following through his television series, vlogs and livestreams that chart his adventures on Britain's waterways. Christina Collins extolled Cumming for showing viewers the stark realities of everyday life on a narrowboat. She described him as not a product, but a sign of our times during the cost of living crisis, noting, "while Prunella Scales and Timothy West (in Great Canal Journeys) popularised the canals' green corridors and dreamy paces, Robbie is grassroots – and young. And this is striking in austerity Britain, where owning your own home has taken on the glamour of the landed gentry to the younger generation." The series was also credited for encouraging more people to spend time on Britain's canals.

The first episode of series 6 was the highest rated unscripted program that was streamed within a month of its launch on UKTV's streaming service.

== Theatre ==
In 2024, Cumming toured the UK in a one-man stage show titled Canal Boat Stories Live!, featuring behind the scenes photos, unseen footage, music, stories from his time on the Naughty Lass and a live audience Q&A session. Following a successful inaugural run, further tours have been arranged.

== Home media ==
All DVD releases have been produced by Dazzler; a boxset comprising Series 1-4 was released on Region 2 on 5 February 2024. The fifth series was released on 28 April 2025, whilst the sixth series was released on 22 September 2025.
