= Ripon Canal =

Canal in North Yorkshire, England

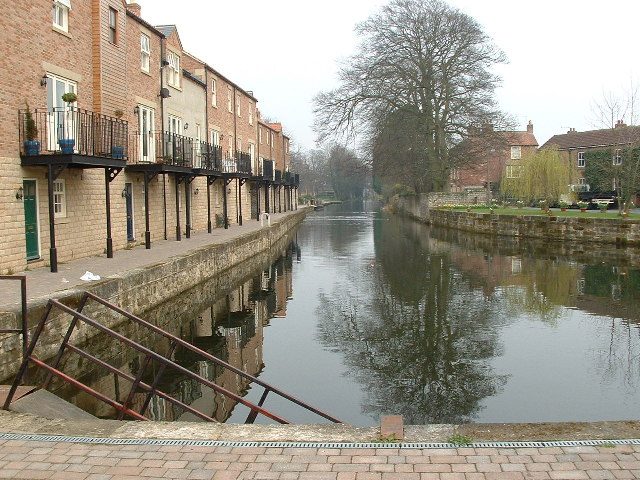
- Ripon Canal basin, at the end of the Ripon Canal
- Interactive map of Ripon Canal

Specifications
- Maximum boat length: 57 ft 0 in (17.37 m)
- Maximum boat beam: 14 ft 3 in (4.34 m)
- Locks: 3
- Status: Operational
- Navigation authority: Canal and River Trust

History
- Original owner: River Ure Commissioners
- Principal engineer: William Jessop
- Date of act: 1767
- Date of first use: 1773
- Date closed: 1956
- Date restored: 1996

Geography
- Start point: Ripon
- End point: Oxclose Lock
- Connects to: River Ure

The Ripon Canal is located in North Yorkshire, England. It was built by the canal engineer William Jessop to link the city of Ripon with the navigable section of the River Ure at Oxclose Lock, from where boats could reach York and Hull. It opened in 1773 and was a moderate success. It was sold to the Leeds and Thirsk Railway in 1847 and was effectively closed by 1906 owing to neglect. It was not nationalised with most canals and railways in 1948 and was abandoned in 1956.

In 1961 members of the Ripon Motor Boat Club formed the Ripon Canal Company Ltd and gradually restored the canal up to Littlethorpe. Subsequently the Ripon Canal Society spearheaded restoration, which was completed in 1996. It is now managed by the Canal & River Trust.

== History ==
The building of the Ripon Canal was authorised by an act of Parliament, the River Ure Navigation Act 1766 (7 Geo. 3. c. 93), passed on 15 April 1767, and the canal was the final part of a larger plan to upgrade the River Ure from its junction with the River Swale to Oxclose, where the canal would leave the river and head for Ripon, some 2.3 miles (3.7 km) away. Below the Swale the Ure becomes the River Ouse, and so carriage of goods to and from York and Hull would be possible. The estimated cost of the whole project was £9,000, and the act established commissioners, who could borrow money in order to fund the development although the total amount of money to be borrowed was not regulated by the act. The works were designed to allow the passage of keels, which were 58 by 14.5 feet (17.7 by 4.4 m).

Work started first on the lower sections, which were progressively opened from 1767. The canal route was surveyed by William Jessop and work on its construction started in 1770, with Jessop acting as Engineer, supervised by John Smeaton. The engineer overseeing the day-to-day operation was John Smith, and a masonry contractor from Halifax called Joshua Wilson was also employed. Construction was completed in early 1773, at a cost of £16,400, and regular services between Ripon and York started in February. The canal was fed with water by a feeder that left the Rivers Laver and Skell in Ripon. One of the primary purposes of the canal was the carriage of coal to Ripon, north from the Yorkshire coalfields, with lead and agricultural produce moving in the opposite direction.

Trade on the canal grew steadily, but there were difficulties by the 1820s, as the commissioners had failed to repay the original loans and interest totalling £11,450 had accrued on them. The original commissioners had ceased to function, and so a group of creditors formed "The Company of Proprietors of the River Ure Navigation to Ripon", and obtained a second act of Parliament, the River Ure Navigation to Ripon Act 1820 (1 Geo. 4. c. xxxv), on 23 June 1820, which gave them powers to raise £34,000 by the issuing of shares, with an extra £3,400 if needed. They were required to spend £3,000 on repairs within five years of the act being issued.

Improvements were made, both as a result of the act and separately in 1838, which resulted in larger boats being able to negotiate the canal. Payloads increased from 30 tonnes in 1822 to 70 tonnes in the 1840s, when the navigation could accommodate boats drawing 4.5 feet (1.4 m) all the way to Ripon. It was never able to handle the Humber sloops, which ran as far as Boroughbridge, with their width of 15.8 feet (4.8 m) and draught of 6.5 feet (2.0 m).

Despite the railway from Darlington to York opening on 4 January 1841, which provided a way to bring coal from the Durham Coalfields south to York, the Aire and Calder Canal were shipping around 26,931 tonnes of coal per year along the Ure Navigation at the time, and the Company of Proprietors was making profits of £886 on an income of £2,013. Some of this traffic stopped at Boroughbridge on the River Ure but a good proportion passed along the canal to Ripon.

== Decline ==
1844 marked a turning point for the canal. The Leeds and Thirsk Railway Company wanted to build their railway and sought to buy the Ure Navigation, and hence the canal, in order to gain local support for their plans and in the hope of reducing the potential opposition to their bill in parliament. The sale was agreed between the two boards and the railway company's shareholders endorsed the decision in January 1845. The Leeds and Thirsk Railway Act 1845 (8 & 9 Vict. c. civ) to authorise the railway was obtained in July 1845, and the navigation was bought for £34,577 in January 1846, although only £16,297 was paid in cash. The act required the railway company to keep the navigation open and in good order.

Railway expansion was rapid, with the Leeds and Thirsk Railway becoming the Leeds Northern Railway, and then that becoming part of the North Eastern Railway in 1854. The navigation was neglected and the lack of dredging resulted in boats having to be loaded with less cargo. There was a brief upturn in trade in the 1860s but the decline continued after that. By 1892 no traffic proceeded past Boroughbridge and the Ripon Canal was effectively disused. The first attempt to abandon the waterway was made by the North Eastern Railway in 1894 but local opposition prevented it. It was then offered to the Corporation of York as a gift but was not accepted. The NER then took action to prevent the waterway above Boroughbridge being used, and the canal was reported to be impassable by 1906. The River Ouse, and therefore the canal, were not nationalised in 1948 when most British canals were, but with no traffic the canal was officially abandoned in 1956, under the terms of the British Transport Commission Act 1955 (4 & 5 Eliz. 2. c. xxx).

== Restoration ==
Although an offer by the British Transport Commission to sell the canal to Ripon Corporation in 1952 had been declined, closure of the canal was unpopular locally and such opposition prevented the canal from being filled in. In 1961 the Ripon Canal Company Ltd was formed, consisting largely of people who were part of the Ripon Motor Boat Club, with the intention of leasing the canal and gradually reopening it. The lower half from Oxclose Lock to Littlethorpe was finally restored to use 25 years later. To assist with the restoration of the section from Littlethorpe Lock to Ripon the Inland Waterways Association managed to have the idea included in North Yorkshire County Council's "River Ure and Ouse Recreational Subject Plan". The Council suggested that a restoration society should push this forwards and so the Ripon Canal Society was formed in 1983. The restoration was finally completed in 1996 and David Curry MP declared it open at a ceremony held on 8 September. With their task completed the Ripon Canal Society disbanded at their 1997 annual general meeting, giving the remains of their funds towards the repair of Linton Lock lower down the River Ure. Management of the canal was handed over to British Waterways and transferred to the Canal & River Trust in 2012.

== Features ==
Ripon was said to be the most northerly point of the connected British canal system, a claim that was affected by the opening of the Ribble Link in 2002. The Lancaster Canal is now considered to be part of the connected canal system and Tewitfield, at its northern end, now qualifies for this accolade.

The canal terminates at a basin close to the centre of Ripon, where one of the warehouses has been restored. New housing on one side of the basin has been designed to fit in sympathetically and there is some older housing on the other side. There are no moorings in the terminal basin itself but short-term mooring is available just to the south. There is also a marina near Ripon Racecourse. The canal is only 2.3 miles (3.7 km) long, and the entire length has a canalside walk, which utilises the towpath from Rhodesfield Lock to Oxclose Lock, although the towpath cannot be used by cyclists.

== Points of interest ==
Point	Coordinates (Links to map resources)	OS Grid Ref	Notes
Ripon Basin	54.1324°N 1.5183°W	SE315708	
Rhodesfield Lock	54.1282°N 1.5059°W	SE323703	
Bell Furrows Lock	54.1247°N 1.5049°W	SE324699	
Oxclose Lock	54.1067°N 1.4931°W	SE332679	Junction with River Ure

== See also ==
- Canals of the United Kingdom
- History of the British canal system

== Bibliography ==
- Cumberlidge, Jane (2009). Inland Waterways of Great Britain (8th Ed.). Imray Norie Laurie and Wilson. ISBN 978-1-84623-010-3.
- Hadfield, Charles (1972). The Canals of Yorkshire and North East England (Vol 1). David and Charles. ISBN 978-0-7153-5719-4.
- Hadfield, Charles (1973). The Canals of Yorkshire and North East England (Vol 2). David and Charles. ISBN 978-0-7153-5975-4.
- Nicholson (2006). Nicholson Waterways Guide, Vol 6. Harper Collins Publishers Ltd. ISBN 978-0-00-721114-2.
- Priestley, Joseph (1831). "Historical Account of the Navigable Rivers, Canals, and Railways, of Great Britain". Archived from the original on 6 March 2016.
- Squires, Roger (2008). Britain's Restored Canals (2nd Ed.). Landmark Publishing. ISBN 978-1-84306-331-5.
