= The Waterways Trust =

- Successor: Canal and River Trust (England and Wales); Scottish Waterways Trust (Scotland)
- Formation: 1999
- Type: Charitable trust
- Region served: England, Wales and Scotland
- Key people: The Prince of Wales (Patron)
- Main organ: Board of Trustees
- Website: www.thewaterwaystrust.org.uk

The Waterways Trust was an independent registered charity, established in 1999, that worked with partners to see the waterway network in England, Wales and Scotland supported, valued and enjoyed by a wide audience. The Trust was formerly registered in England and Wales and in Scotland, until July 2012 when the operations in England and Wales were merged with the newly established Canal & River Trust. The remaining operations in Scotland were renamed the Scottish Waterways Trust.

The Trust's principal funder was British Waterways. Its Patron was Prince Charles, and its Vice Presidents were Paul Atterbury, John Craven OBE, John Fletcher, Miranda Krestovnikoff, Sonia Rolt, David Suchet OBE and Timothy West CBE.

The Trust cared for the nationally important inland waterways collection and the National Waterways Museum at Ellesmere Port, Gloucester Waterways Museum, and The Canal Museum at Stoke Bruerne.

The Trust operated a Small Grants Scheme, and administered the annual Waterways Renaissance Awards jointly with the British Urban Regeneration Association (BURA). The awards recognised projects which contributed to the regeneration of the waterways, and were awarded in ten categories.

== See also ==
- List of waterway societies in the United Kingdom
