= Scottish Canals =

Government public body

- (Scottish Gaelic: Canàlan na h-Alba)
- Scottish Canals logo
- Predecessor: British Waterways
- Formation: 2 July 2012
- Type: executive non-departmental public body of the Scottish Government
- Headquarters: Glasgow, Scotland, UK
- Region served: Scotland
- Chairman of Board: Maureen Campbell
- Chief Executive: John Paterson
- Budget: £19.2m
- Staff: 284
- Website: www.scottishcanals.co.uk
- Formerly called: British Waterways (Scotland)

Scottish Canals (Scottish Gaelic: Canàlan na h-Alba) is the Scottish Government body responsible for managing the country's inland waterways. Formerly a division of British Waterways, it became a stand-alone corporation on 2 July 2012, then an executive non-departmental public body of the Scottish Government in April 2020.

Based in Glasgow, Scottish Canals cares for 137 miles (220 km) of waterway network in total, including 17 reservoirs and the navigation rights to four lochs, including Loch Ness. The body is responsible for five canals.

- Caledonian – 60 miles (97 km)
- Crinan – 9 miles (14 km)
- Forth and Clyde – 35 miles (56 km)
- Monkland (no longer operational, although two watered sections remain) – 2 miles (3.2 km)
- Union Canal – 31 miles (50 km)

== History ==
British Waterways was founded in 1962 under the Transport Act, taking over statutory responsibility for operating and maintaining waterways across Great Britain.

In 2010 the UK Government determined that responsibility for inland waterways in England and Wales should pass to a new charitable trust, the Canal & River Trust. However, the Scottish Government decided that canals in Scotland would remain publicly owned and British Waterways would continue to operate in Scotland as a statutory corporation trading as Scottish Canals. This public body became wholly accountable to Scottish Ministers with effect from 2 July 2012. Legally, the organisation is still referred to as the British Waterways Board, but in all other aspects it uses the brand Scottish Canals. In 2017, with a workforce of around 250 people, it was accredited as a Scottish Living Wage employer.

In April 2020, Scottish Canals changed from operating as a public corporation to a non-departmental public body. This change in designation was made by HM Treasury because Scottish Canals did not generate half its revenues externally. One requirement of the change was that Scottish Canals had to follow the accounting guide issued by HM Treasury. When auditors reviewed the draft accounts in 2022, they found that valuations for specialist assets thought to be worth around £51 million had not been obtained. The assets included dredging equipment, canal basin widening works and lock gates. When an estimate of replacement costs for these assets was produced, using methodology that had been used since 2012, the auditors were still unhappy, and issued a disclaimer on whether the financial statements were accurate. Scottish Canals have since worked with Transport Scotland, the Scottish Government, and their auditors to establish a new way of valuing all of the assets that they own.
