= British Waterways =

Canal and inland waterway authority

- British Waterways logo adopted in 1991
- Type: Statutory corporation
- Industry: Waterways
- Predecessor: British Transport Commission
- Founded: 1962
- Defunct: 2012
- Successor: Canal & River Trust; Scottish Canals
- Headquarters: Watford, England
- Key people: Robin Evans (Chief Executive); Tony Hales (Chairman)
- Revenue: £176,500,000 (2010/11)
- Total assets: £676,900,000 (2010/11)
- Owner: UK Government
- Number of employees: 2,000
- Parent: DEFRA
- Website: britishwaterways.co.uk

British Waterways, often shortened to BW, was a statutory corporation wholly owned by the government of the United Kingdom. It served as the navigation authority for the majority of canals and a number of rivers and docks in England, Scotland and Wales.

On 2 July 2012, all of British Waterways' assets and responsibilities in England and Wales were transferred to the newly founded charity the Canal & River Trust. In Scotland, British Waterways continues to operate as a standalone public corporation under the trading name Scottish Canals.

The British Waterways Board was initially established as a result of the Transport Act 1962 and took control of the inland waterways assets of the British Transport Commission in 1963. By the final years of its existence, British Waterways was sponsored by the Department for Environment, Food and Rural Affairs (DEFRA) in England and Wales, and by the Scottish Government in Scotland.

British Waterways managed and maintained 2,200 miles (3,541 km) of canals, rivers and docks within the United Kingdom including the buildings, structures and landscapes alongside these waterways. Half of the United Kingdom population lives within five miles of a canal or river once managed by British Waterways. In addition to the watercourses, British Waterways also cared for and owned 2,555 listed structures including seventy scheduled monuments. A further 800 areas have special designation and a further hundred are Sites of Special Scientific Interest (SSSIs).

Through its charitable arm The Waterways Trust, British Waterways maintained a museum of its history at the National Waterways Museum's three sites at Gloucester Docks, Stoke Bruerne and Ellesmere Port. Since the transfer of the assets and responsibilities of British Waterways to the Canal & River Trust, The Waterways Trust in England and Wales has merged with the Canal & River Trust. It continues, however, as an independent charity in Scotland.

== History ==
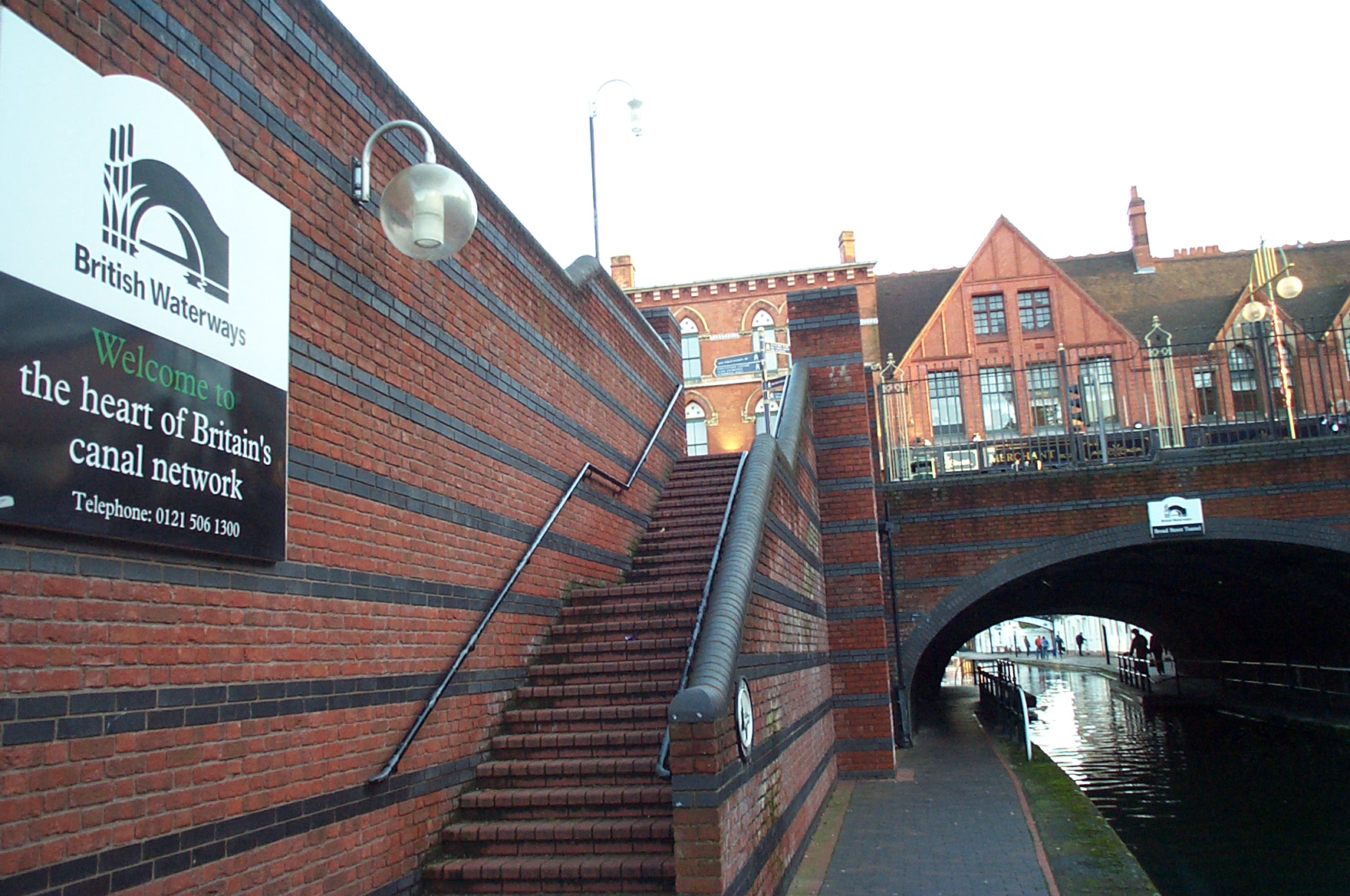
British Waterways sign near Gas Street Basin on the BCN Main Line in Birmingham

House flag used by British Waterways

=== Formation ===
During the early 20th century, the canal network was in decline because of increasing competition from the railways and road transport. Until the 1950s, freight and other cargo was still carried on the canals, by then owned by the railway companies. When the railways were nationalised in 1948, the canals they owned were also incorporated into the new British Transport Commission. The commission focused on encouraging commercial traffic to the waterways, but with the construction of motorways in the 1950s, and legislation such as the Clean Air Act 1956 affecting the coal carriers using the waterways, that policy could not be sustained. The last regular coal long-distance narrow-boat-carrying contract, from Atherstone to the Kearley and Tonge jam factory at Southall near London, ended in October 1970, although lime juice continued to be carried by narrow boat from Brentford to Boxmoor until 1981, and aggregate from Thurmaston to Syston from 1976 until 1988.

Under the Transport Act 1962, the British Transport Commission was split into several new organisations, including the British Railways Board and the London Transport Board, with the inland waterways of Britain becoming part of the new British Waterways Board (BWB).

In the same year, a remarkably harsh winter saw many boats frozen into their moorings, unable to move for weeks at a time. That was one of the reasons given for the decision by the BWB to formally cease most of its commercial narrow boat traffic on the canals. By that time, the canal network had shrunk to just 2,000 miles (3,200 km), half the size it was at its peak in the early 19th century. However, the basic network was still intact, with many of the closures affecting duplicate routes or branches.

=== Transport Act 1968 ===
The Transport Act 1968 classified the nationalised waterways into three distinct categories as specified by BWB:

- Commercial – Waterways that could still support commercial traffic; these were mainly located in the North East of England
- Cruising – Waterways that had a potential for leisure use, such as cruising, fishing and recreational use
- Remainder – Waterways for which no potential commercial or leisure use could be seen.

British Waterways Board was required under the Act to keep commercial and cruising waterways fit for their respective traffic and use. However, these obligations were subject to the caveat of being by the most economical means and BWB had no requirement to maintain remainder waterways or keep them in a navigable condition. As a result, many remainder waterways could face abandonment or transference to the local authority who would contribute to the waterway's upkeep as part of the act. Additionally, many of these remainder waterways were crossed by new roads and motorways without provision for boat navigation.

=== Late 20th century ===
As the century progressed, leisure boating on the canals began to expand, with numbers reaching 20,000 by the early 1980s. Additionally, the work of voluntary restoration groups succeeded in restoring some waterways to their former condition. However, despite this steady progress throughout the 1970s and 1980s, organisations such as English Heritage criticised the newly named British Waterways for failing to provide "adequate training or access to professional advice [for British Waterways officers] on the conservation of historic structures".

However, by the late 1990s the canal network and British Waterways were flourishing; revenues generated for canal maintenance reached £100 million for the first time in 1998, large grants from the Heritage Lottery Fund allowed the canal network to expand again by restoring former canals and additional funding was announced for British Waterways in 1999 by the then Deputy Prime Minister John Prescott. By the early 2000s, boating numbers had overtaken the previous industrial revolution high and the canal network was officially classed as 'safe' following the completion of all outstanding safety works.

=== Abolition ===
By 2009, British Waterways was looking for a means of gaining a larger and more secure supply of funding in order to plug a £30m shortfall in its budget, while utilising the potential for volunteers on the waterways, allowing the waterways community to play a greater role. Its plans involved moving to become a charitable trust, in charge of the current canal systems in addition to acquiring other waterways, such as those operated by the Environment Agency.

In March 2010, the plans were given a boost when the government announced in the Budget that it intended to turn BW into a mutual organisation, but no further details were released. BW welcomed the announcement, with the chairman Tony Hales stating that the plan would preserve the canals and their associated infrastructure, and "safeguard against a return to the decline and dereliction which they faced in the last century". It would also "unlock the enormous public support that there is for them."

By September of the same year, the proposals seemed likely to be enacted; a leaked list of quangos that were due to be abolished was acquired by the BBC, including British Waterways, with the note: "Abolish as a non-departmental public body and mutualise". The following month saw an official announcement from British Waterways confirming the leaked list, and that a new charity would be established to tend the 2,000 miles (3,200 km) of canals and rivers in England and Wales cared for by British Waterways.

The new name, the Canal & River Trust, and logo were revealed in October 2011, and the trust was granted charitable status on 5 April 2012. On 2 July 2012 all of British Waterways' responsibilities for waterways in England and Wales were transferred to the Canal & River Trust. The Scottish Government, however, decided that the waterways in Scotland would not be part of the new charity, and that British Waterways Scotland would remain a state-owned entity, operating as Scottish Canals.

== Organisation ==
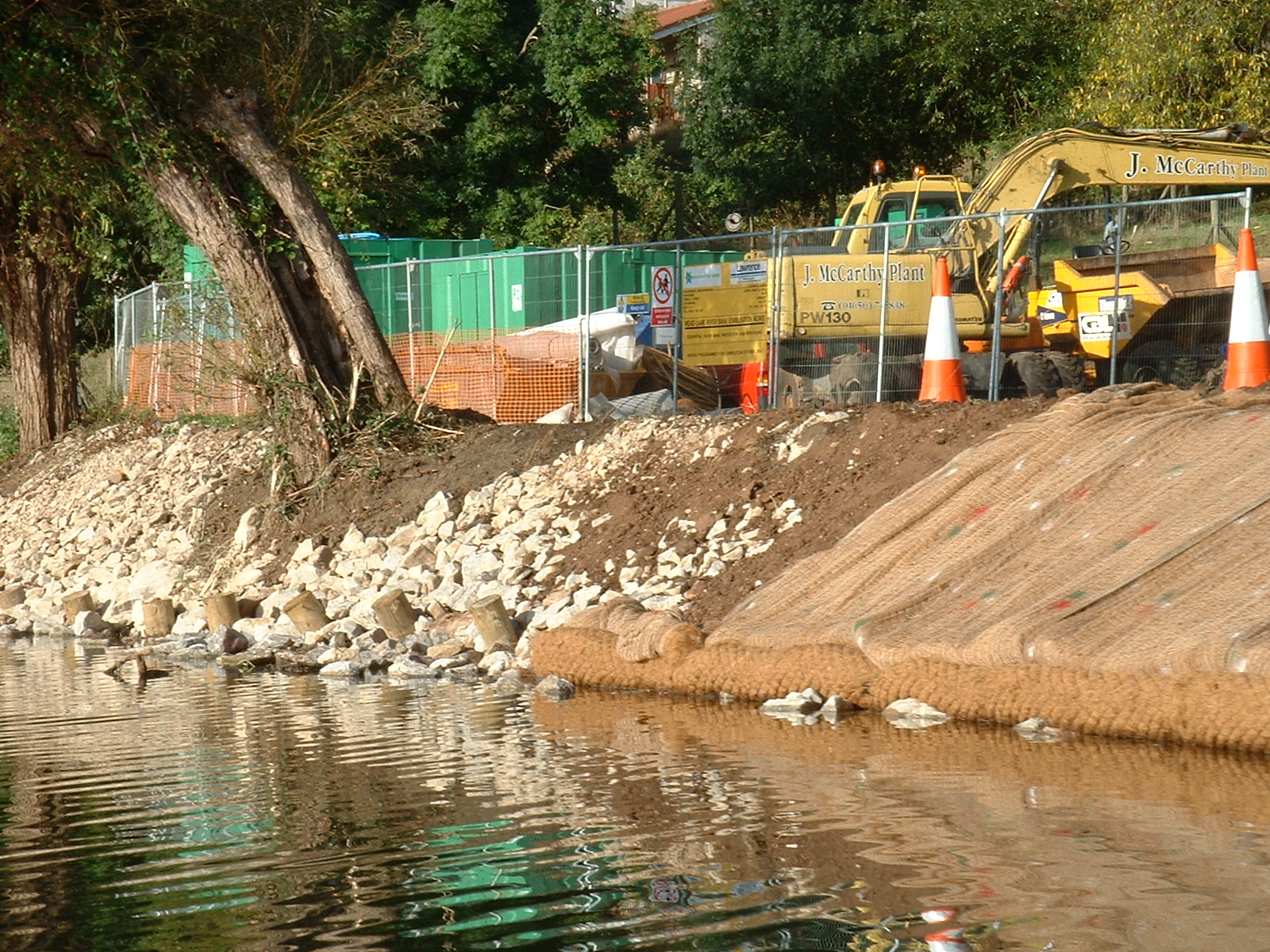
Bank repair on the River Avon

British Waterways operated from headquarters in Watford, with additional administrative offices in Leeds and thirteen regional waterway offices.

At the strategic level, there were ten non-executive board members, who were led by the chairman (in the final phase of operations, Tony Hales), and appointed by the Secretary of State for Environment, Food and Rural Affairs and the Scottish Government (eight by the former and two by the latter). In addition, there were nine executive directors led by Robin Evans, the Chief Executive.

At a regional level, British Waterways was divided into thirteen regional waterways; each appointed a waterways manager. These regions were:

- Scotland (Highlands)
- Scotland (Lowlands)
- North West Waterways
- North East Waterways
- Manchester and Pennine Waterways
- North Wales and Borders Waterways
- West Midlands Waterways
- Central Shires Waterways
- East Midlands Waterways
- South Wales and Severn Waterways
- South East Waterways
- Kennet and Avon Waterways
- London Waterways

== Finance ==
British Waterways was funded through a mixture of commercial activities, government grants and grants and donations from charitable bodies. In 2010/11, BW raised over £103.6 million from their commercial activities, including waterways licensing, received £58.9 million from a government grant, issued via the Department for Environment, Food and Rural Affairs, and gained a further £14 million through third party contributions. However, operating revenue for the company was at a deficit of £3.7 million, a result of a large cut of 16 per cent in the government grant given to BW, and through the continuing programme of renovation and works costing £92.1 million.

British Waterways owned a large canalside property portfolio which made a considerable contribution to the funding of the waterway network. This amounted to £130m in the five years prior to 2008. As of 2008, a HM Treasury team was reviewing the management of this portfolio in terms of public sector savings and efficiencies. Another source of revenue contemplated by BW in October 2008 was the installation of 50 wind turbines on waterside land, generating around 100 megawatts.

== Waterscape ==
As part of British Waterways' commitment to promote the canals to users other than boaters, BW set up the Waterscape website in 2003 to be an official information and leisure resource for UK inland waterways. The website worked alongside the Environment Agency and the Broads Authority and covered all canals, rivers and waterways in England, Scotland and Wales.

The Waterscape website was taken down on 3 July 2012 and was replaced by the new website of the Canal & River Trust.

== Waterways operated ==
The following waterways and dockland were under British Waterways' ownership and care:

- Aire and Calder Navigation
- River Aire
- Ashby Canal
- Ashton Canal
- Birmingham Canal Navigations
- Birmingham and Fazeley Canal
- Bow Back Rivers
- Bridgwater and Taunton Canal
- Calder and Hebble Navigation
- Caldon Canal
- Caledonian Canal
- Chesterfield Canal
- Coventry Canal
- Crinan Canal
- Cromford Canal
- Droitwich Barge Canal and Droitwich Junction Canal
- Erewash Canal
- Forth and Clyde Canal
- Foss Dyke
- Gloucester and Sharpness Canal
- Grand Union Canal
- Grantham Canal
- Hertford Union Canal
- Huddersfield Broad Canal
- Huddersfield Narrow Canal
- Kennet and Avon Canal
- Lancaster Canal
- River Lee
- Leeds and Liverpool Canal, including Liverpool Canal Link
- Liverpool Docks (south of Pier Head only)
- Limehouse Cut
- Llangollen Canal
- Macclesfield Canal
- Manchester Bolton & Bury Canal
- Millwall Dock
- Monkland Canal (not navigable)
- Monmouthshire and Brecon Canal
- Montgomery Canal
- New Junction Canal
- Nottingham Canal
- River Ouse
- Peak Forest Canal
- Pocklington Canal
- Oxford Canal
- Regent's Canal
- Ribble Link
- Ripon Canal
- Rochdale Canal
- St. Helens Canal (not navigable)
- Selby Canal
- River Severn
- Sheffield and South Yorkshire Navigation
- Sheffield and Tinsley Canal
- Shropshire Union Canal, including Middlewich Branch and Shrewsbury Canal
- River Soar
- Staffordshire and Worcestershire Canal
- Stainforth and Keadby Canal
- River Stort
- Stourbridge Canal
- Stratford-upon-Avon Canal
- Swansea Canal
- Tame Valley Canal
- Tees Navigation and Barrage
- River Trent (navigation authority of a section only; the navigation authority of the rest is Associated British Ports)
- Trent and Mersey Canal
- Union Canal
- Ure Navigation
- River Weaver
- West India Docks
- River Witham
- Worcester and Birmingham Canal
- Wyrley and Essington Canal

== Other inland waterways in Britain ==
The Environment Agency is the navigation authority for the non-tidal River Thames, rivers in the Fens and East Anglia and some other waterways. The Port of London Authority is that for the tidal section of the Thames. The Broads Authority is the navigation authority for the Norfolk Broads. The Manchester Ship Canal, Bridgewater Canal, Basingstoke Canal, Neath and Tennant Canal, Cam and Chelmer and Blackwater Navigation were managed by other authorities.

== See also ==
- Canal & River Trust
- Canals of the United Kingdom
- History of the British canal system
- List of navigation authorities in the United Kingdom
- List of rivers of the United Kingdom
- Narrowboat
- World Canals Conference
