= Gloucester Waterways Museum =

Museum in Gloucester, England

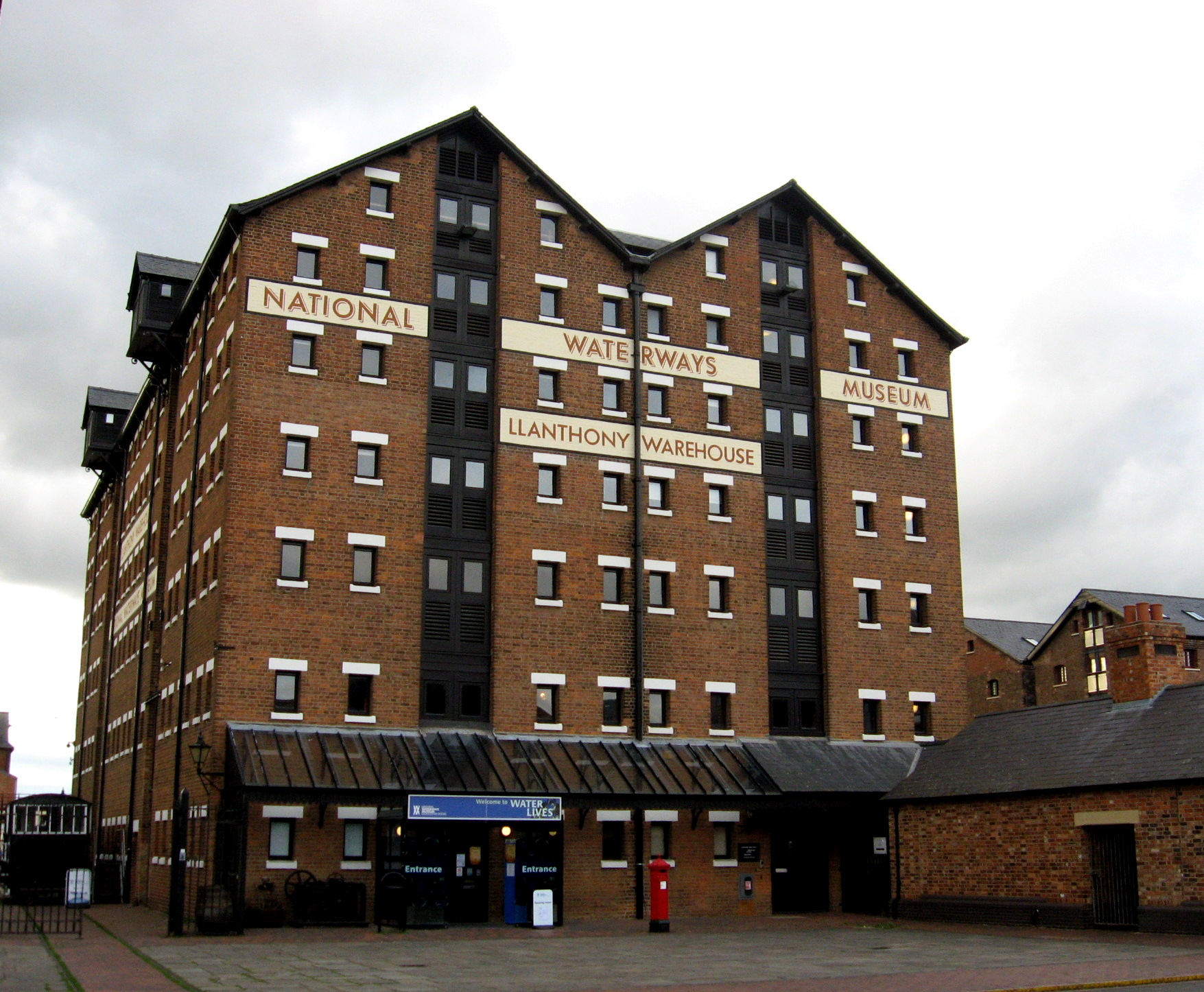

- Location of museum in Gloucestershire
- Former name: National Waterways Museum, Gloucester
- Established: 1988
- Location: Gloucester Docks
- Coordinates: 51°51′43″N 2°15′10″W
- Type: Maritime
- Architect: Capel N Tripp
- Owner: Canal and River Trust
- Website: canalrivertrust.org.uk/gloucester-waterways-museum

Listed Building – Grade II
- Official name: Llanthony Warehouse
- Designated: 14 December 1971
- Reference no.: 1245607

Gloucester Waterways Museum is housed in a Victorian warehouse at Gloucester Docks in the city of Gloucester, England. It is located along the Gloucester and Sharpness Canal and River Severn. Until 2010, it was known as the National Waterways Museum at Gloucester.

It is one of several museums and attractions operated by the Canal & River Trust, the successor to The Waterways Trust.

== History ==
The museum opened in 1988. Formerly known as the "National Waterways Museum, Gloucester", it was one of three museums operated by the Waterways Trust that focussed on the history of canals in Britain. The museum went through extensive refurbishments between 2007 and 2008, adding new galleries. In the summer of 2010 the Gloucester site was renamed the Gloucester Waterways Museum, focussing on the local area. This meant that the museum could apply for funding of a different type from the types that were available to national museums.

The museum features a collection of boats including narrowboats, river barges, canal and river tugs, and a steam-powered dredger. There is also a steam crane and heavy oil engine in the setting of a canal repair yard, which is complete with working machine shop, forge and weighbridge, and a hydraulic accumulator. The museum uses modern interactive techniques and hands-on exhibits, including a model of a section of a canal with working locks.

== Building ==
The Gloucester Waterways Museum is part of Llanthony Warehouse, Gloucester, built in 1873. Designed by Capel N Tripp, for local corn merchants, Wait, James & Co. It is a six storey red brick building, with a slate roof and stone lintels and sills. The warehouse would have been used for storing timber, grain and alcohol. The building was designated Grade II listed status on 14 December 1971 and was converted to become the National Waterways Museum in 1987.
