= Canal & River Trust =

Trust for waterways in England and Wales

- Glandŵr Cymru (Welsh)
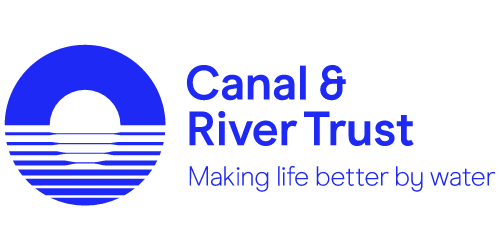
- Main logo Logo used in Wales
- Abbreviation: CRT
- Predecessor: English and Welsh parts of British Waterways and; The Waterways Trust
- Formation: 2 July 2012
- Registration no.: 1146792
- Legal status: Charitable trust
- Headquarters: Ellesmere Port, England
- Region served: England and Wales
- Members: Friends of the Canal & River Trust scheme
- Official languages: English and Welsh
- Chief Executive: Campbell Robb
- Chairman: David Malcolm Orr
- Patron: King Charles III
- Main organ: Board of Trustees
- Staff: 1,810
- Volunteers: 4,306
- Website: canalrivertrust.org.uk

The Canal & River Trust (Welsh: Glandŵr Cymru) is a charitable trust in England and Wales, responsible for over 2,000 miles of canals and rivers, reservoirs and a wide range of adjacent heritage buildings and structures. Launched on 12 July 2012, the trust took over the responsibilities of the state-owned British Waterways in England and Wales.

== Purpose and scope ==
The Canal & River Trust is responsible for the conservation and management of over 2,000 miles of canals, rivers, docks and reservoirs, along with museums, archives and the country's third-largest collection of protected historic buildings, with over 2,700 in its care. The Trust has 68 sites of Special Scientific Interest and four World Heritage Sites.

The Trust is registered with the Charity Commission of England and Wales.

The Canal & River Trust is the largest inland waterway navigation authority in England and Wales, with legal responsibility for the management of much of its network of waterways; the Environment Agency manages a less extensive set of inland waterways. The Trust receives income from licences issued to boat owners.

The trust covers England and Wales. Separate government organisations exist in Scotland (Scottish Canals) and Northern Ireland (Waterways Ireland) and hold similar responsibilities for specific waterways.

== History ==
The concept of a National Waterways Conservancy was first championed and articulated in the 1960s by Robert Aickman, the co-founder of the Inland Waterways Association, as a way to secure the future of Britain's threatened inland waterways network.

The idea was revived by the management of British Waterways in 2008 in response to increasing cuts in grant-in-aid funding, a drop in commercial income after the 2008 financial crisis and growing calls by waterway users for a greater say in the running of the waterways.

On 18 May 2009, launching 'Twenty Twenty – a vision for the future of our canals and rivers' on the terrace of the House of Commons, British Waterways proposed a radical overhaul of waterway management and a transfer from public corporation to not-for-profit organisation. The event was supported by speakers from each of the three main parties: Charlotte Atkins MP, Peter Ainsworth MP and Lembit Opik MP. British Waterways' chairman, Tony Hales, said: "The private sector built the canals, the public sector rescued them, and I believe the third sector can be their future".

In November 2009, British Waterways published another paper, 'Setting a New Course: Britain's Inland Waterways in the Third Sector'. This promoted the original suggestion by British Waterways that it should become a private company, inheriting all of the property and other waterway assets held in public ownership.

In March 2010, the Labour government announced its decision to mutualise British Waterways, a commitment which was repeated in Labour's 2010 manifesto: "To give more people a stake in a highly valued national asset, British Waterways will be turned into a mutually owned co-operative".

Following the 2010 general election, the incoming coalition government reaffirmed its support for status change on the waterways, as an example of the Conservative Party's commitment to the so-called Big Society. Waterways Minister Richard Benyon stated on 21 June 2010 the government's "intention to move British Waterways to the civil society, subject to the outcome of the spending review."

Between March and June 2011, Defra ran a public consultation 'A New Era for the Waterways' on the overall structure of the proposed new body, the potential inclusion of the river navigations under the management of the Environment Agency (another public body), and the abolition of the Inland Waterways Advisory Council.

In October 2011, British Waterways announced a name and logo for a charitable trust which would inherit its English and Welsh operations: the Canal & River Trust, branded in Wales as Glandŵr Cymru (meaning Waterside Wales) — the Canal & River Trust in Wales. The Trust received charitable status in April and received parliamentary approval in June.

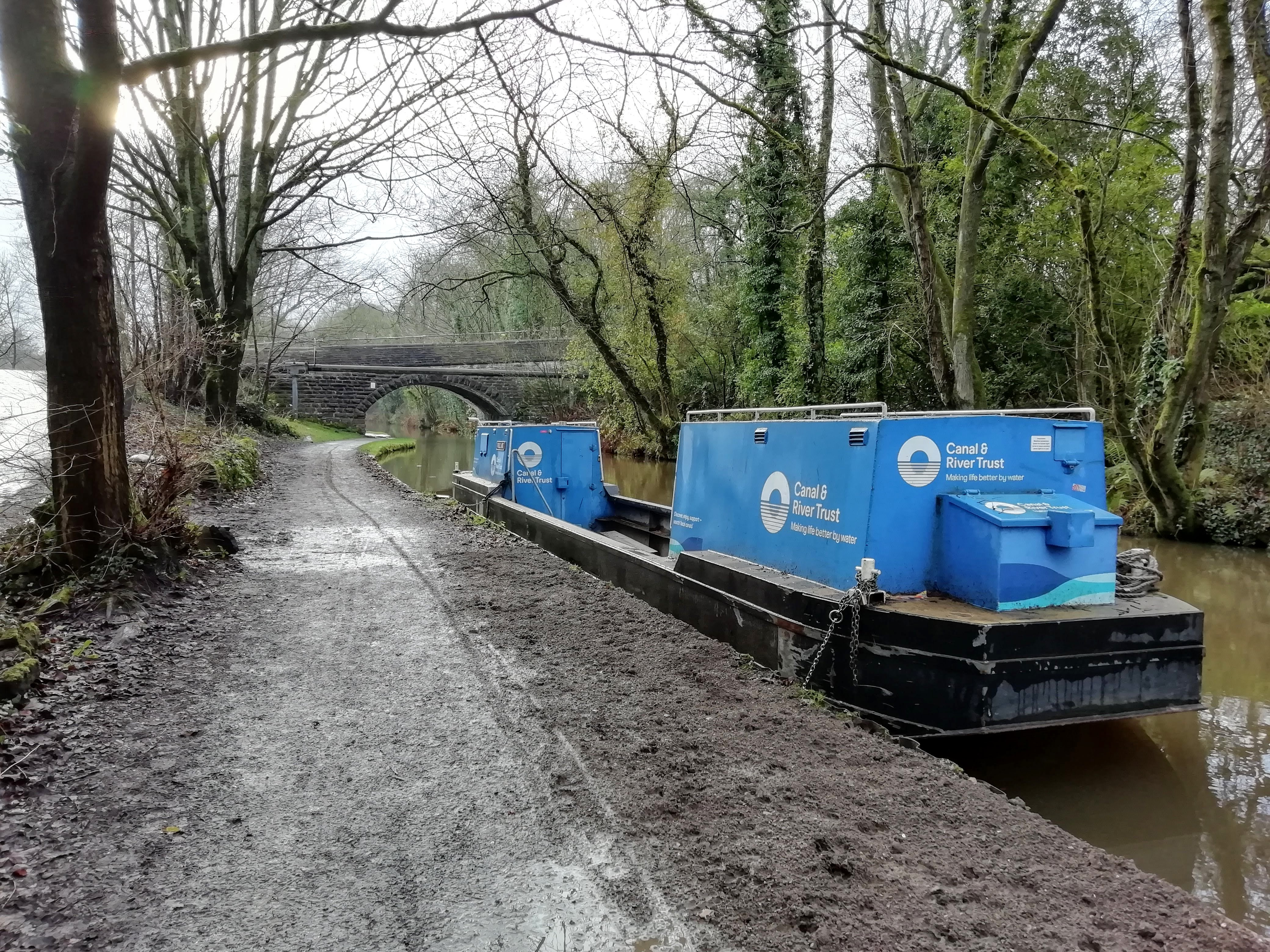
Canal & River Trust workboat on the Peak Forest Canal near Furness Vale, High Peak, Derbyshire in December 2020

In July 2012, all British Waterways' assets, liabilities and responsibilities in England and Wales were transferred to the Canal & River Trust, which was launched officially on 12 July. At the same time, the Canal & River Trust merged with the English and Welsh operations of The Waterways Trust, a charity previously affiliated to British Waterways, to avoid confusion and as both charities had similar aims.

BWML, a private company limited by guarantee, was formerly owned by the Canal & River Trust and managed some 20 marinas. It was sold in December 2018 and subsequently rebranded as Aquavista.

=== Scotland ===
In Scotland, British Waterways continues to operate as a stand-alone public corporation under the trading name Scottish Canals.

== Access to waterways and towpaths ==
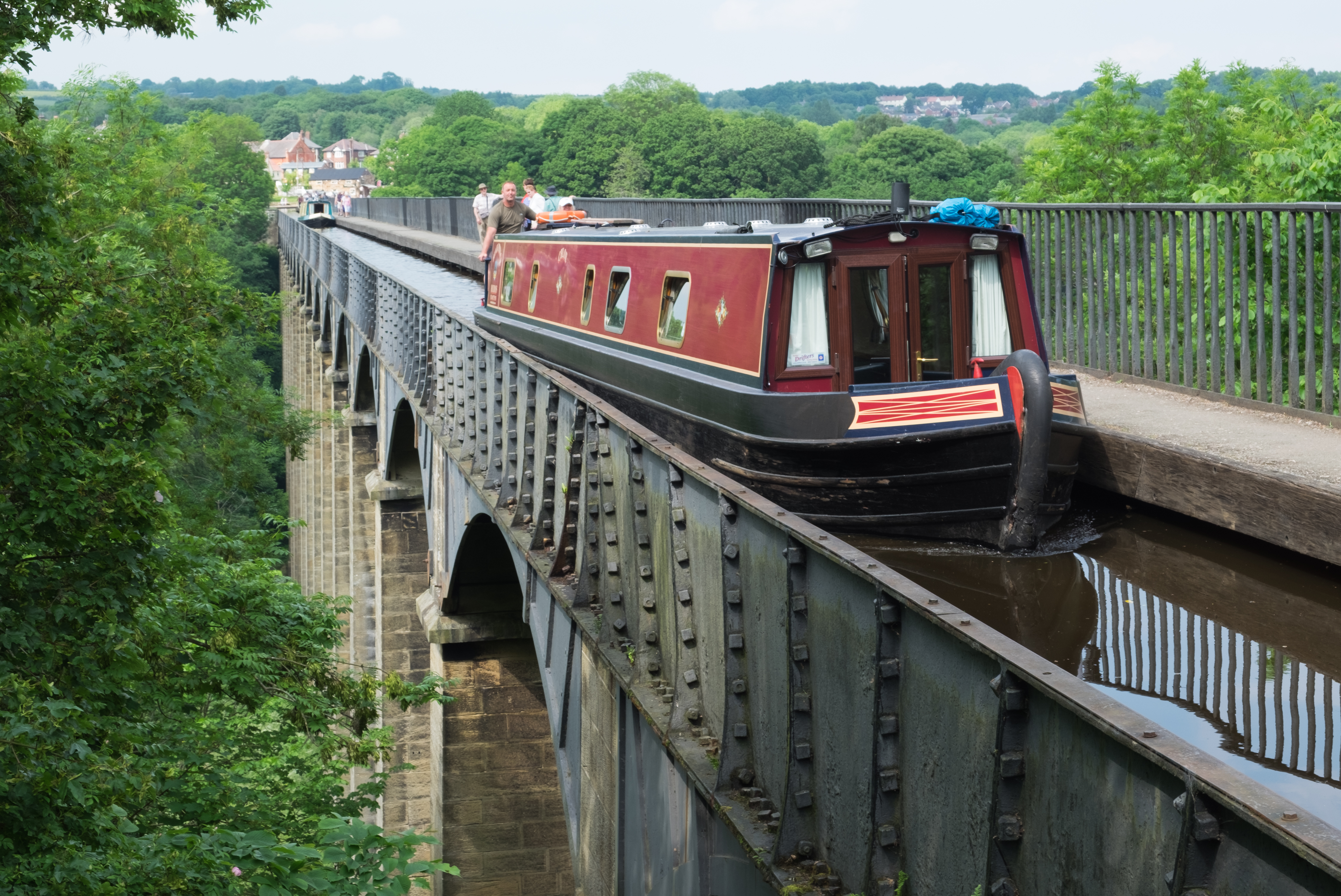
The Pontcysyllte Aqueduct, near Llangollen, Wales, which carries the Llangollen Canal across the River Dee. This structure, built between 1795 and 1805, is grade I listed and a World Heritage Site

Waterways in the care of the Canal & River Trust are accessible for use by boats, canoeists, paddleboarders and other watercraft upon payment of an appropriate licence fee.

Walkers and cyclists can use the extensive network of towpaths that run alongside the canals and rivers without payment of a fee. Horses may not be ridden or walked on a towpath unless it has been formally designated as a bridleway. Access by motorbikes and other motorised vehicles is not permitted.

== Structure ==
=== Governance ===
The trust is headed by a board of 10 appointed and unelected trustees with a chairperson, which is legally responsible for overseeing the work towards the Trust's charitable objectives and sets strategy for the trust. The trust has a 28-member council which referees the business of the trust and whose composition reflects the range of waterway users, from boating and angling through to walking and conservation. Finally, an executive team and six regional directors are collectively concerned with the ordinary running of the trust.

==== Council ====
The Council is made up of up to 50 members and is led by the Board of Trustees Chair, David Malcolm Orr. Members of the Council include a mix of elected and independently nominated individuals, together with six Regional Advisory Board chairs.

The Council is responsible for the appointment of Trustees, and advises on policy, raises and debates issues, and provides perspective and guidance to the Board of Trustees.

==== Board of Trustees ====
The Trustees are legally responsible for ensuring that the trust meets its charitable objectives.

Trustees are the unpaid board directors of the trust, taking collective decisions on policy and overarching strategy and providing oversight of the executive directors.

There are 11 Trustees. The Chair is David Malcolm Orr.

==== Partnerships ====
For each of the Trust's waterway regions, there is a regional partnership drawn from local communities. In addition, an all-Wales partnership considers issues relating to Welsh waterways, and a separate partnership exists for the Trust's museums and attractions.

==== Management ====
Executive directors manage the everyday operation of the trust and develop policy and strategy for approval by the trustees.

==== National Advisory Groups ====
The trust is supported through several advisory groups covering a range of different areas from freight and navigation to volunteering and heritage. These groups provide advice directly to the management of the trust.

=== Regions ===
The trust's head office is in Ellesmere Port. It operates 11 local offices that deal with the general maintenance of the waterways in their area. These offices are based on the Waterways Partnership, which are:

- East Midlands region, based at Newark, Nottinghamshire
- London and South East region, based at Little Venice and Milton Keynes
- North West region, based at Wigan, Lancashire
- Wales and South West region, based at Gloucester
- West Midlands region, based at Cambrian Wharf, Birmingham, West Midlands.
- Yorkshire and North East region, based at Leeds

== Finance ==
The Trust receives a fixed grant from the Department for the Environment, Food and Rural Affairs over the 15 years commencing in 2012. Its major other sources of income are from utilities (including fibre optic data connections and water sales) and property rentals from a £500 million property endowment granted by the government. It also receives income from issuing licences for boats using and mooring on the waterways; this is one of the largest income streams that Canal and River Trust Limited has, after the government grant and it has been given a funding pledge by the People's Postcode Lottery of over £1 million.

== Supporters and corporate partners ==
Charles III is the patron of the Canal & River Trust, and the actor Brian Blessed supports the trust's volunteer appeal.

In June 2012, the trust announced three major corporate partners to support the Canal & River Trust:

- Google partnered with the Canal & River Trust to include the UK's towpaths on Google Maps. This includes highlighting access points, bridges, locks and tunnels. Once the project is complete, members of the public will have the ability to plan journeys that include canal and river towpaths as well as roads.
- The People's Postcode Lottery pledged to support the Canal & River Trust with £1m of funding. The charity lottery promised to support the restoration and conservation work of the Canal & River Trust over the next decade through the Postcode Green Trust.
- The Co-operative Bank and the Canal & River Trust work together to provide financial products that allow people to support the work of the Trust.

== Waterways operated ==
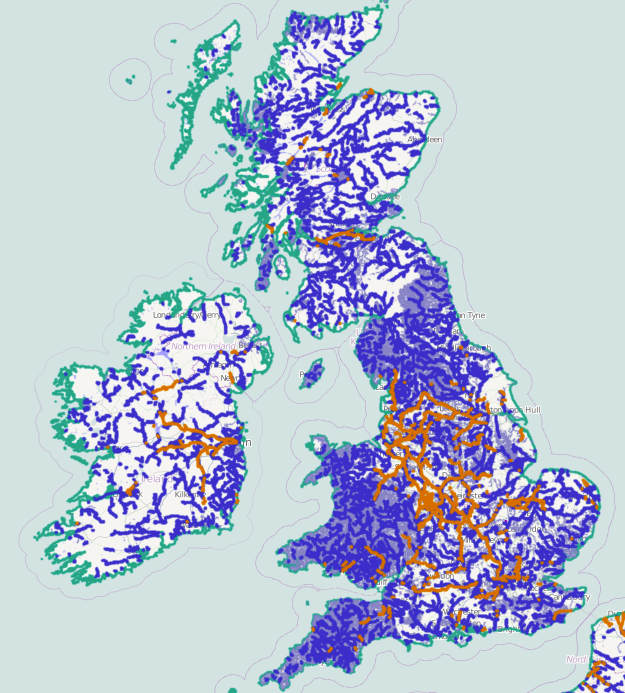
Map showing canals of Great Britain and Ireland. Canals in orange, rivers in blue, streams in grey.

The Canal & River Trust is the owner or navigation authority for over 2,000 miles of waterways. These are:

- Aire and Calder Navigation
  - Wakefield Branch
- Ashby Canal
- Ashton Canal
- Birmingham Canal Navigations
  - Old and New Main Lines
  - Birmingham and Fazeley Canal
  - Dudley Canals No. 1 and 2
  - Rushall Canal
  - Tame Valley Canal
  - Titford Canal
  - Walsall Canal
  - Wednesbury Oak Loop
  - Wednesbury Old Canal
  - Wyrley and Essington Canal
    - Anglesey Branch
    - Cannock Extension Canal
    - Daw End Branch
- Bow Back Rivers
- Bridgwater and Taunton Canal
- Calder and Hebble Navigation
- Caldon Canal
- Chesterfield Canal
- Coventry Canal
- Droitwich Canal
- Erewash Canal
- Fossdyke
- Gloucester and Sharpness Canal
- Grand Union Canal
  - Aylesbury Arm
  - Old Grand Union/Leicester Line
  - Market Harborough Arm
  - Northampton Arm
  - Paddington Arm
  - Slough Arm
  - Welford Arm
  - Wendover Arm
- Grantham Canal
- Hertford Union Canal
- Huddersfield Broad Canal
- Huddersfield Narrow Canal
- Kennet and Avon Canal
- Lancaster Canal including the Glasson Branch
- Lee Navigation
- Leeds and Liverpool Canal
  - Leigh Branch
  - Liverpool Canal Link
  - Rufford Branch
- Limehouse Cut
- Llangollen Canal
- London Docklands including West India Docks.
- Macclesfield Canal
- Manchester Bolton & Bury Canal
- Monmouthshire and Brecon Canal
- Montgomery Canal
- Nottingham Canal
- Oxford Canal
- Peak Forest Canal
- Pocklington Canal
- Regent's Canal
- Ribble Link
- Ripon Canal
- River Aire
- River Ouse
- River Severn Navigation
- River Soar
- River Stort
- River Trent
- River Witham
- Rochdale Canal
- Sankey Canal
- Selby Canal
- Sheffield and South Yorkshire Navigation
  - New Junction Canal
- Sheffield Canal
- Shropshire Union Canal
  - Middlewich Branch
  - Shrewsbury Canal
- Staffordshire and Worcestershire Canal
- Stainforth and Keadby Canal
- Stourbridge Canal
- Stratford-upon-Avon Canal
- Swansea Canal
- Tees Navigation
- Trent and Mersey Canal
- Ure Navigation
- Weaver Navigation
- Worcester and Birmingham Canal

== Museums ==
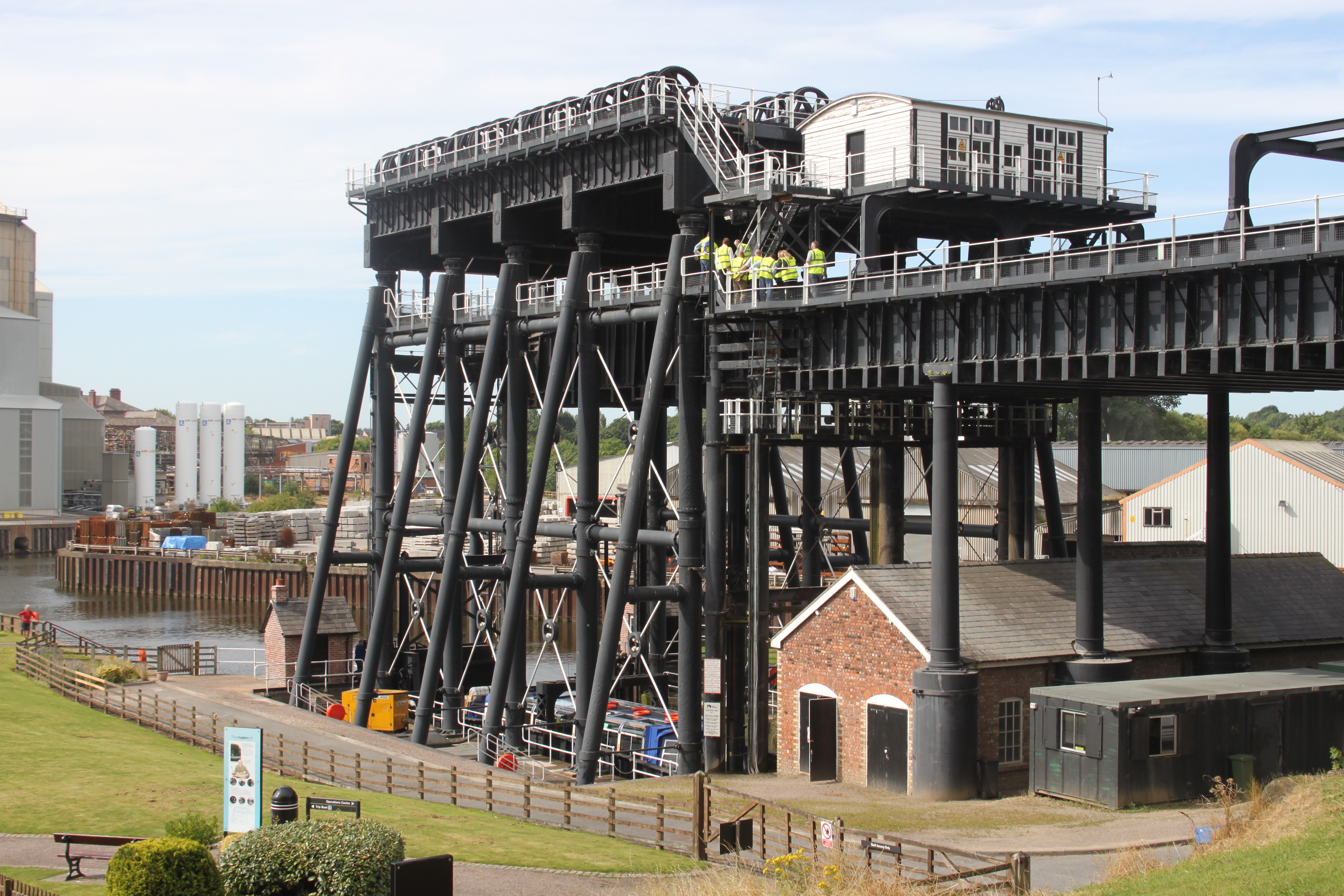
The Anderton Boat Lift, Cheshire

The Canal & River Trust operates several museums and visitor attractions that relate to canals and waterways.

- National Waterways Museum, Ellesmere Port, Cheshire
- The Canal Museum, Stoke Bruerne, Northamptonshire
- Gloucester Waterways Museum, Gloucester
- Anderton Boat Lift, Anderton, Cheshire
- Standedge Tunnel & Visitor Centre, Marsden, West Yorkshire

== Controversies ==
In December 2016, Private Eye magazine reported that the Canal & River Trust had seized a historic retired lightship which had been moored for ten years at the docks near the maritime museum in Liverpool, following a dispute over unpaid berthing fees. The ship, named Planet, had served as the country's last crewed lightship until 1989, when it went to a museum and later to Liverpool's docks, where it was restored and used as a cafe and volunteer-operated maritime radio museum. The ship's owner reportedly owed overdue berthing fees, which were subsequently paid but not before the trust had towed and impounded the boat in Sharpness, Gloucestershire, thereby incurring further hefty fees. The Merseyside Civic Society launched a petition to bring the vessel back to Liverpool, but the trust later sold it for £12,500, less than its estimated scrap valuation of £70,000. The trust faced possible legal action over the seizure and sale of the ship.

In November 2019, the Trust was criticised for not acting on calls to open a sluice gate in Worksop during extensive flooding in the area. The gate was eventually opened by the fire service, several hours after the first request to the Trust. The gate is within a building (not owned by the Trust) which the Trust considered to be unsafe.

== See also ==
- Canals of the United Kingdom
- Scottish Canals
- Environment Agency
