= Four Counties Ring =

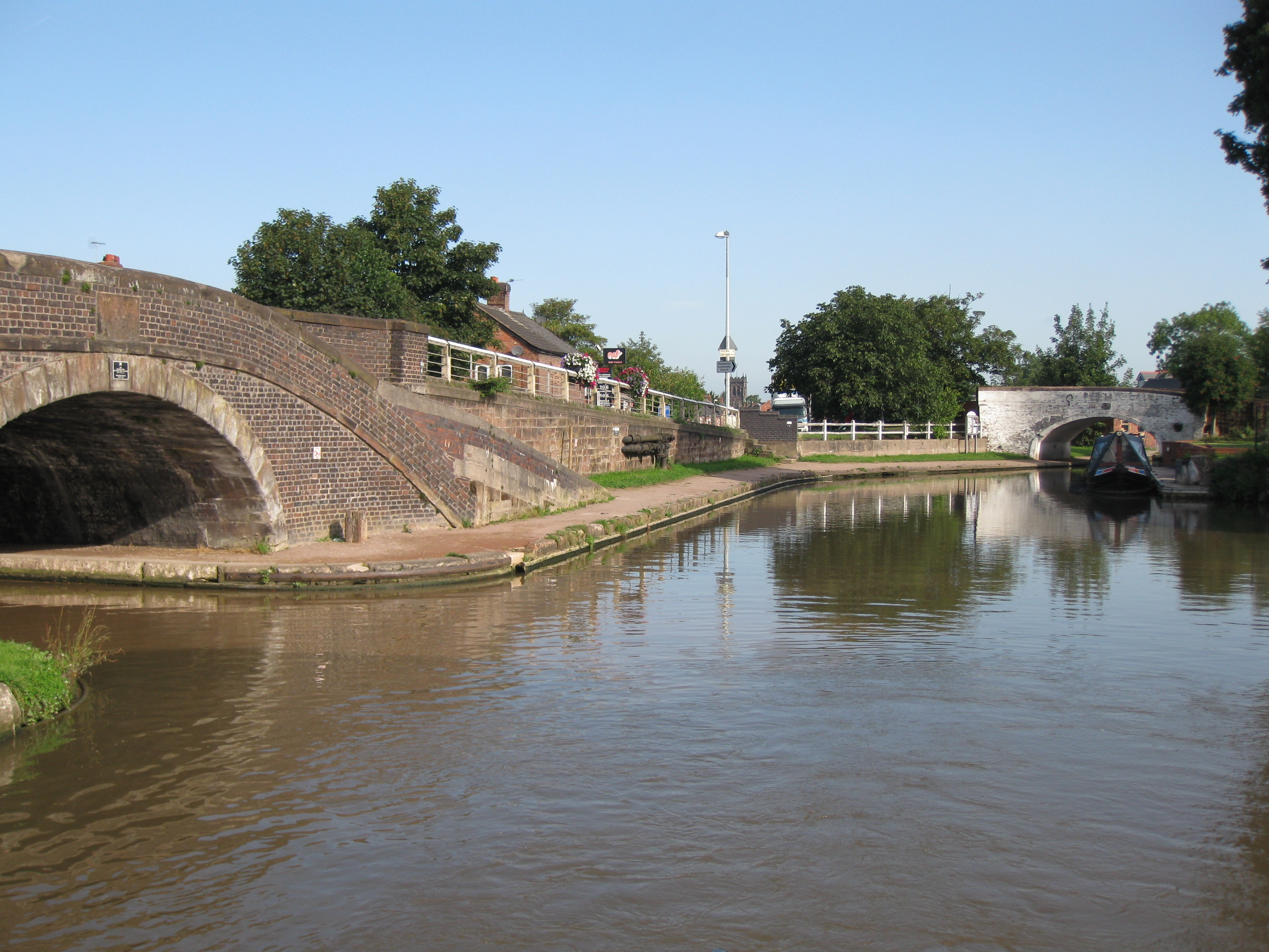
- Passage from the Trent and Mersey Canal to the Wardle Canal passes under the bridge on the left.

Specifications
- Length: 110 miles (180 km)
- Locks: 94
- Status: Canal ring
- Navigation authority: Canal and River Trust

The Four Counties Ring is a canal ring which links the four English counties of Cheshire, Staffordshire, Shropshire and West Midlands.

== Route ==
The Four Counties Ring, which offers a variety of scenery and cruising for a narrowboat holiday, takes in the counties of Cheshire, Shropshire, Staffordshire and West Midlands. Highlights include the Industrial Canal Heritage of the Stoke-on-Trent potteries region, the wealthy pasturelands of Cheshire, to the stunning remote sandstone cuttings of Shropshire. This route, which is 110 miles long and includes 94 locks, is commonly used by holiday boaters. While energetic crews may be able to complete the ring in just a week, those who do not want to be cruising all day for the entire week will typically take two weeks.

The ring traverses parts of five canals, listed in anti-clockwise order from Middlewich Junction:

- Wardle Canal
- Shropshire Union (Middlewich Branch)
- Shropshire Union Canal
- Staffordshire and Worcestershire Canal
- Trent and Mersey Canal

=== Wardle Canal ===
The short Wardle Canal is normally now considered to be part of the Middlewich Branch of the Shropshire Union Canal. It is around 100 yards (91 m) long and contains a bridge over the entrance and a lock. It was built in 1829 by the Trent and Mersey Canal to ensure that they retained control over the junction.

=== Middlewich Branch ===
After passing through the environs of Middlewich, two aqueducts carry the Middlewich Branch over the A530 road and the River Wheelock. The rest of the branch is quite rural and passes through farmland and woods. It rises through Stanthorne Lock and is then crossed by the West Coast Main Line running between Crewe and Winsford. Beyond the bridge, the River Weaver is just to the west of the canal, and there are good views over Winsford Top Flash, a large lake caused by subsidence from salt extraction. It passes Church Minshull, popularised by the writer and campaigner Tom Rolt, who stopped there in his boat Cressy, before crossing over the Weaver on another aqueduct. There are two more locks, separated by a bridge carrying the Chester and Crewe Railway, after which the route reaches Barbridge Junction and the main line of the Shropshire Union Canal. The branch is 10 miles (16 km) long and contains three locks, in addition to the one on the Wardle Canal.

=== Shropshire Union Canal ===
At Barbridge Junction, the Four Counties Ring turns to the left and heads to the south-east. The first section between the junction and Nantwich was originally part of the Chester Canal, built in the 1770s, but a series of amalgamations led to it becoming part of the Shropshire Union network in 1846. The Chester Canal was built with locks which were 9 feet (2.7 m) wide, rather than the 7 feet (2.1 m) of the Nantwich Branch, although there are no locks between the junction and the terminal basin at Nantwich, and so the difference is not quite so obvious. After a short distance, another branch of the Shropshire Union system turns to the west at Hurleston Junction. It rises through four locks close to the junction, and has been rebranded as the Llangollen Canal. Just to the north of Nantwich is the basin where the Chester Canal terminated before the building of the Birmingham and Liverpool Junction Canal to Autherley Junction. This was a narrow canal, and so the locks and bridge holes are again 7 feet (2.1 m) wide.

The Birmingham and Liverpool Junction Canal was not opened until 1835, by which time canals were not built to follow the contours as the early ones had done, and the route consists of fairly straight sections with locks grouped into flights. It crosses over the A534 road near Nantwich, but passes to the west of the main centre of population. It passes under the Nantwich to Whitchurch railway line, and then rises through two locks at Hack Green. At Audlem, 15 locks raise the level of the canal by 93 feet (28 m) and another five at Adderley ascend through 31 feet (9.4 m). The open countryside is briefly interrupted by the town of Market Drayton, where the run-down wharf has been rejuvenated.

Two more aqueducts cross a minor road and the River Tern before there is another 33-foot (10 m) rise through the five Tyrley Locks. The skills of the original builders are visible on the next section, as the canal sits on top of the high Shebdon Embankment, and then passes through Grub Street Cutting. Beyond it is Norbury Junction, no longer a proper junction, although the first lock on the Shrewsbury Canal has been turned into a dry dock and the short stretch of canal above it is used as moorings. There is a wide basin and a British Waterways depot at the location. Just to the south is Shelmore Embankment, pierced by two road tunnels. There were continual problems with slippage during its construction, and it was the final part of the Birmingham and Liverpool Junction Canal to be completed, having taken five and a half years of solid work to build. Flood gates at each end protect the rest of the canal should it breach.

At Gnosall the canal passes under an abandoned railway line and the A518 road before entering a short tunnel at Cowley. It is 81 yards (74 m) long, and emerges into a deep cutting with almost vertical sides. Cuttings and embankments enable the canal to reach Wheaton Aston, where there is a single lock, after which Stretton Spoil Bank brings the canal to Stretton Aqueduct, a cast iron structure that crosses the A5 road, which follows the route of the Roman Watling Street at this point. Belvide reservoir is just beyond the road, and is the main supply of water for the canal. The canal remains level as it passes under the M54 motorway, to arrive at Autherley Junction, where there is a stop lock. Between Barbidge and Autherley Junctions, the route has covered 42.1 miles (67.8 km) and there are 29 locks. The central pound is 17.6 miles (28.3 km) long.

=== Staffordshire and Worcestershire Canal ===
At Autherley Junction, the route turns sharp left to follow the Staffordshire and Worcestershire Canal northwards. It was opened in 1772, and is a contour canal, so winds across the landscape. Locks tend to occur singly, rather than in flights, but the initial section is part of the summit pound, and so is level for the first 7.8 miles (12.6 km). Major communication routes cross it, including the M54 motorway, the A449 Wolverhampton to Stafford road, the railway between the same two towns, and the A5 road from London to North Wales. Before the A5 are the remains of the Hatherton Branch, now rebranded as the Hatherton Canal and the subject of an active restoration campaign. By the A5 road, and a little to the east, are the two Gailey Reservoirs, which can feed into the canal via the Hatherton Branch, but are now seldom used for this purpose. Gailey Top Lock occurs immediately before the road bridge, to be followed by four more after it. The reservoirs are not visible from the canal, because the M6 motorway has been built between them and the canal. It runs alongside the canal for about 0.5 miles (0.8 km).

The canal leaves the motorway for a while to pass through the centre of Penkridge, where there are two locks, and one more to the north before the motorway crosses to its west bank. After two more locks and the village of Acton Trussell the motorway turns to the west to bypass Stafford, and the canal becomes peaceful again. Immediately after Deptmore Lock, the canal crosses a tributary of the River Penk, which has been close by since Penkridge. The canal continues to the north after the A34 road crosses at Radford Bridge, and then turns to the south-east. The Penk joins the River Sow near the turn, and there was a junction with the River Sow Navigation that serviced Stafford. There are plans to restore the link into Stafford. The canal now follows the Sow Valley, and crosses the river a little before Tixall Lock. Beyond the lock is Tixall Wide, more like a lake than a canal, and thought to have been built to ensure that the views from Tixall House were not compromised. Just before Great Haywood Junction, the canal crosses the River Trent on an aqueduct. The distance covered from Autherley Junction is 20.5 miles (33.0 km) and there are 12 locks.

=== Trent and Mersey Canal ===
At the junction, the ring turns left again, to head north on the Trent and Mersey Canal. The canal follows the Trent Valley, as do the A51 road and the railway from Rugeley to Stoke. The first four locks are spread out, but in Stone there are four more. They are quite deep, with an average rise of 10 feet (3.0 m). They are followed by the four Meaford locks and Trentham Lock before the countryside is replaced by urban sprawl. On the southern edge of Stoke-on-Trent, the River Trent turns to the north-east, while the canal crosses it on an aqueduct and heads to the north-west. There are five more locks before the junction with the Caldon Canal, which was built as a branch of the Trent and Mersey, but is now considered to be a separate canal. The junction is overlooked by a large statue of James Brindley, the engineer who built the canal. The junction is also the start of the summit level, as the ring descends from here to the start point at Middlewich.

The route winds past the site of the junction with the Burslem Arm, and then past Westport Park Lake. It then heads in a straight line for the southern entrance to Harecastle Tunnel. The present tunnel is the second constructed through the hill. Brindley's first tunnel was finished in 1777, but at around 1.75 miles (2.82 km) and with no towpath, it acted as a bottleneck, as boats had to be legged through. Thomas Telford designed a second parallel tunnel, which was completed in 1827 and included a towpath. Brindley's tunnel was abandoned in the twentieth century after it was affected by mining subsidence. The length of Telford's tunnel is 2,926 yards (2,676 m), and an electric tug was used between 1914 and 1954 to speed up traffic through it. Just beyond the northern portal, the Macclesfield Canal turns off to the south and runs parallel to the main line, which drops through two locks, before the Macclesfield crosses over on an aqueduct and heads north.

The main line heads to the north-west, and locks become more frequent. At Hassall Green, the M6 motorway crosses, and at Rookery Railway Bridge, the railway line from Crewe to Stockport. Locks continue to lower the level of the canal, with Kings Lock in Middlewich situated just before the junction with the Wardle Canal. The ring covers 37.4 miles (60.2 km) of the Trent and Mersey and passes through 49 locks.

== See also ==
- Canals of the United Kingdom
- History of the British canal system

== Bibliography ==
- Cumberlidge, Jane (2009). Inland Waterways of Great Britain (8th Ed.). Imray Laurie Norie and Wilson. ISBN 978-1-84623-010-3.
- Nicholson (2006). Nicholson Waterways Guide (Vol 4): Four Counties and the Welsh Canals. Harper Collins. ISBN 978-0-00-721112-8.
