= Frankton Junction =

Canal junction in Shropshire, England

Coordinates: 52.8804°N 2.9369°W

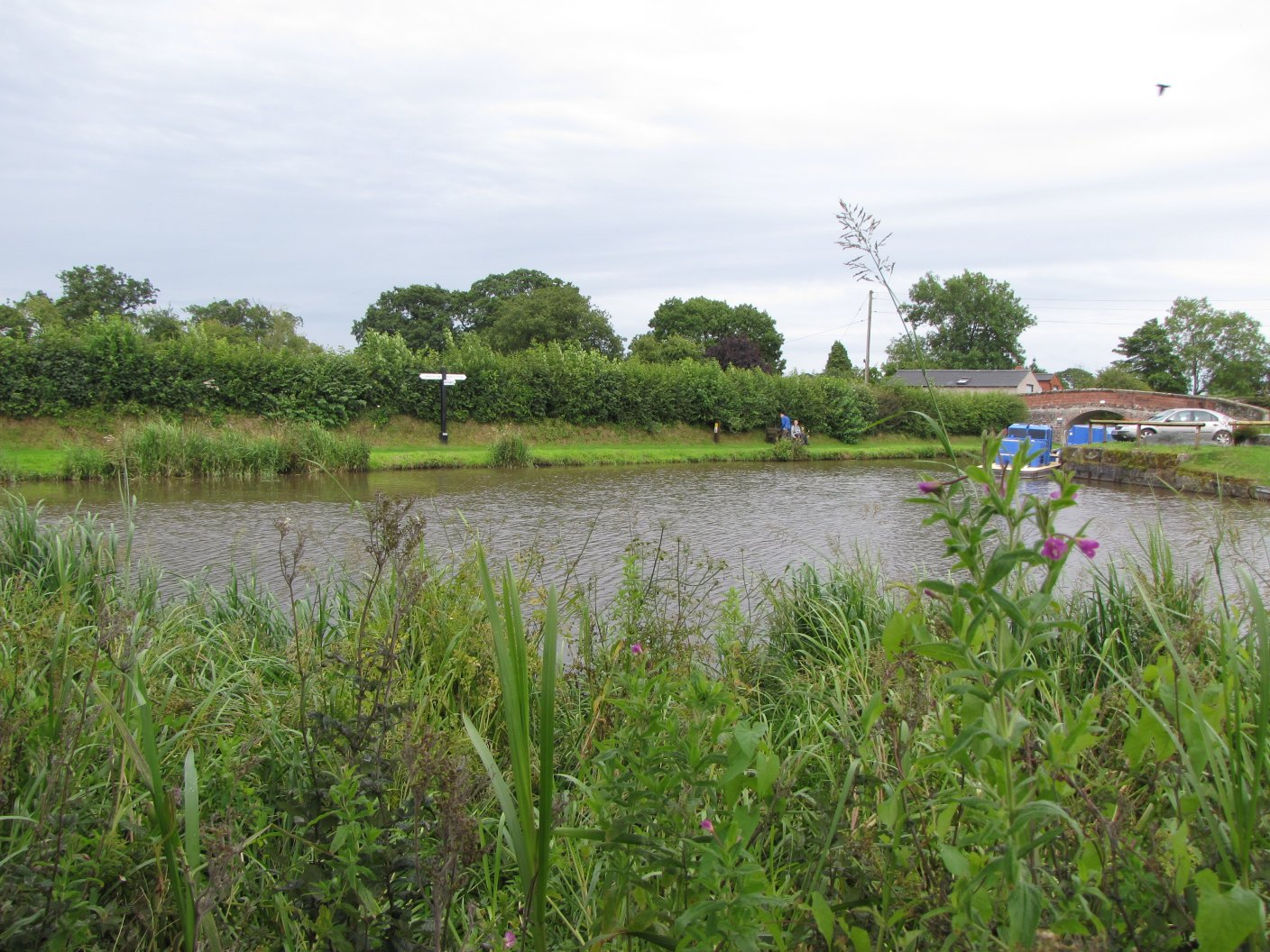
- The route to Hurleston Junction passes through the bridge. Llangollen is to the left, and the Montgomery Canal to the right.

Specifications
- Status: Open
- Navigation authority: Canal & River Trust

History
- Date completed: 1806
- Date closed: 1936
- Date restored: 1987

Frankton Junction (grid reference SJ369318) is the name of the canal junction where the Montgomery Canal terminates and meets the Llangollen Canal at Lower Frankton, Shropshire, England.

== History ==
The Llangollen Canal is the modern name for a canal which was originally part of the Ellesmere Canal. Construction of the Ellesmere Canal was authorised by an Act of Parliament obtained in 1793. By 1796, the company had opened two sections of canal, one from Chester to Ellesmere Port, which was very successful commercially, and the other was the Llanymynech Branch, which left the Chester Canal at Hurleston Junction, and passed through Whitchurch, Ellesmere and Frankton to reach Llanymynech. Ten years later, a total of 68 miles (109 km) of canal had been built, including a navigable feeder from Frankton to a little beyond Llangollen, which brought water from the River Dee, and was the main water supply for much of the network. The completion of this branch effectively created the junction.

Many changes of ownership and name occurred, the first of which was the amalgamation of the Ellesmere and the Chester Canal companies to become the Ellesmere and Chester Canal in 1813. In 1845, this company amalgamated with the Birmingham and Liverpool Junction Canal, which linked the southern terminus at Nantwich to Autherley Junction near Wolverhampton. In the following year, this company was renamed to become the Shropshire Union Railways and Canal Company, which became part of the London and North Western Railway a few months later.

The Montgomeryshire Canal was also authorised in 1793, but was never intended to reach Frankton Junction. It was an independent canal, which would run from Carreghofa, where the Ellesmere Canal's Llanymynech Branch terminated, southwards to Newtown. It opened from Carreghofa to Garthmyl in 1797, but a lack of finance meant that it was not completed to Newtown until 1821, and this final section was built by a third company. The section from Carreghofa to Garthmyl was known as the Eastern Branch, and the route onwards to Newtown as the Western Branch. The canal was never a financial success. The Eastern Branch became part of the Shropshire Union network in 1847, and the Western Branch did so in 1850.

Trade on the Montgomery section declined rapidly in the 1920s, and the junction effectively closed in 1936, when a breach at Perry Aqueduct, 1 mile (1.6 km) to the south of the junction, resulted in the closure of the canal. In 1944, 175 miles (282 km) of the Shropshire Union network were abandoned by Act of Parliament, but the main line of the Shropshire Union Canal was retained, and the branch to Llangollen, through Frankton Junction, was also retained, because of its function as a water feeder.

With the growth of the canal restoration movement, work began on what was then known as the Montgomery Arm of the Shropshire Union Canal, in 1969, when the bed of the canal was threatened by a bypass proposal in Welshpool. The whole branch became known as the Montgomery Canal when a formal restoration campaign was launched soon afterwards. Restoration hopes moved forwards in 1986, when British Waterways submitted a private bill to Parliament, to authorise full reconstruction of the canal, and Montgomeryshire County Council committed £1 million, spread over five years, to fund repairs. The Bill became an Act of Parliament in late 1987, but not before Frankton Locks, which are situated immediately south of the junction, were reopened on 12 September. Prince Charles addressed the crowd on that occasion, mentioning that the restoration of the locks had been achieved by volunteers contributing 12,000 man-hours to the project, with a notional value of £200,000. With the opening of the locks, the junction was again in use.

== Location ==
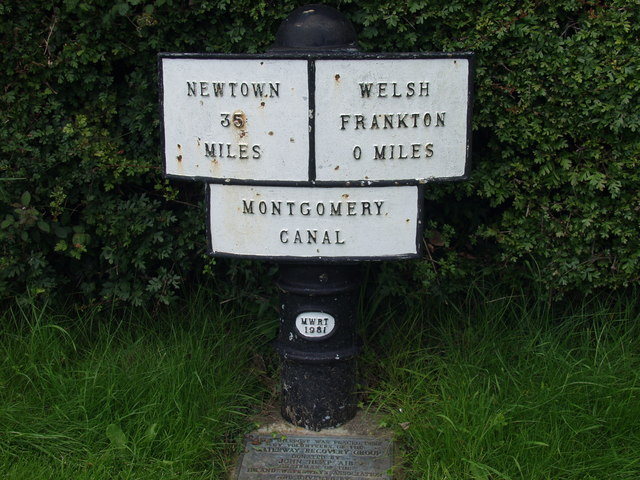
Montgomery Canal milepost at the junction.

The junction is located in Lower Frankton, although mileposts along the Montgomery Canal give distances to Welsh Frankton, which is the next nearest settlement.

The Llangollen Canal is spanned by two bridges, one either side of the junction. To the east is Peter's Bridge, while to the west is Rowson's Bridge, where the towpath crosses from the north bank to the south bank for a short distance. The Frankton Locks, consisting of a staircase of two locks and two single locks, lower the level of the Montgomery Canal immediately south of the junction. A little further along the canal, a fifth lock is named after Graham Palmer, the founder of the Waterway Recovery Group, which was heavily involved in the reconstruction work. The lock has a small fall, and was inserted to compensate for changes in the ground level which had occurred since the canal was closed in 1936.

From the junction, the canal is level towards Llangollen for a distance of 3.4 miles (5.5 km), to the first of the two New Marton Locks. In the other direction, it is level through Ellesmere Tunnel, and passes the Ellesmere Arm, the Prees Branch and the Whitchurch Arm, before reaching the top lock of the six at Grindley Brook, 16.5 miles (26.6 km) from the junction.

=== Bridge numbering ===
As a result of the way in which the canals were built, and have subsequently been renamed, bridge numbering along the Llangollen Canal at Frankton Junction is not straightforward. The bridge to the east is numbered 69 (Peter's Bridge), then the bridge to the west of the junction (Rowson's Bridge) is numbered both 70 and 1. Further west, towards Llangollen, the bridge numbers continue as 2, 3, etc. Bridge number 71 (Lockgate Bridge) is located on what is now the Montgomery Canal, which uses bridge numbering starting with 71. The Llangollen Canal has, because of this, two separate series of bridge numbering, with one ending and the other beginning at Frankton Junction.

== See also ==
- Shropshire Union Canal
- Canals of the United Kingdom
- History of the British canal system

== Bibliography ==
- Cumberlidge, Jane (2009). Inland Waterways of Great Britain (8th Ed.). Imray Laurie Norie and Wilson. ISBN 978-1-84623-010-3.
- Hadfield, Charles (1985). The Canals of the West Midlands. David and Charles. ISBN 0-7153-8644-1.
- Nicholson (2006). Nicholson Guide Vol 4 - Four Counties & the Welsh Canals. Harper Collins. ISBN 0-00-721112-0.
- Squires, Roger (2008). Britain's restored canals. Landmark Publishing. ISBN 978-1-84306-331-5.
