= Barbridge Junction =

Canal junction in Cheshire, England

Coordinates: 53.1087°N 2.5796°W

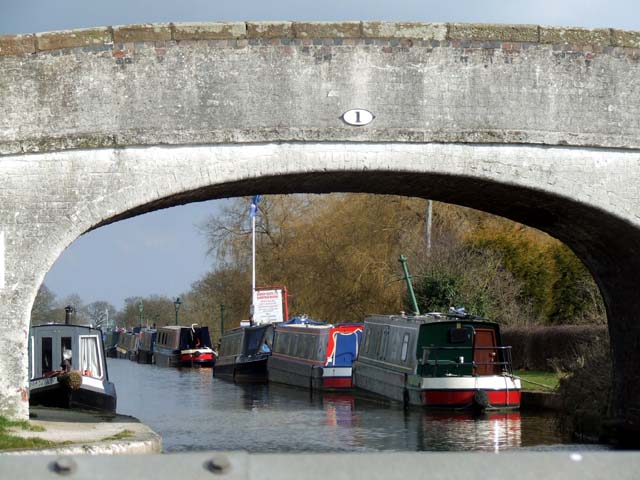
- Narrowboats at Barbridge Junction
- Interactive map of Barbridge Junction

Specifications
- Status: Open
- Navigation authority: British Waterways

History
- Date completed: 1833

Barbridge Junction (grid reference SJ612570) is the name of the canal junction located at Barbridge, Cheshire, where the Shropshire Union Canal Middlewich Branch terminates and meets the Shropshire Union Canal main line.

== History ==
The Chester Canal was conceived in 1771, to provide a link between the Trent and Mersey Canal, then being built, and the River Dee, to prevent the likely demise of the Dee and of Chester as a port once the Trent and Mersey was completed. An Act of Parliament was obtained in 1772 for a narrow canal from Chester to Middlewich, with a branch to Nantwich. As a result of objections by the Duke of Bridgewater and the Trent and Mersey Canal, it had to finish 100 yards (91 m) away from the Trent and Mersey, with no connection between the two. The proprietors built a wide canal, suitable for boats 80 by 14.75 feet (24.38 by 4.50 m), which ran from Chester to Nantwich. There were difficulties, and by the time Nantwich was reached in 1779, there was no money left to build a branch to Middlewich. The canal was a failure, and the company resolved to abandon the canal in 1781. However, they managed to keep going somehow, until construction of the Ellesmere Canal began. The Chester Canal became part of a larger network, which generated more traffic, and the two companies amalgamated in 1813, to become the Ellesmere and Chester Canal.

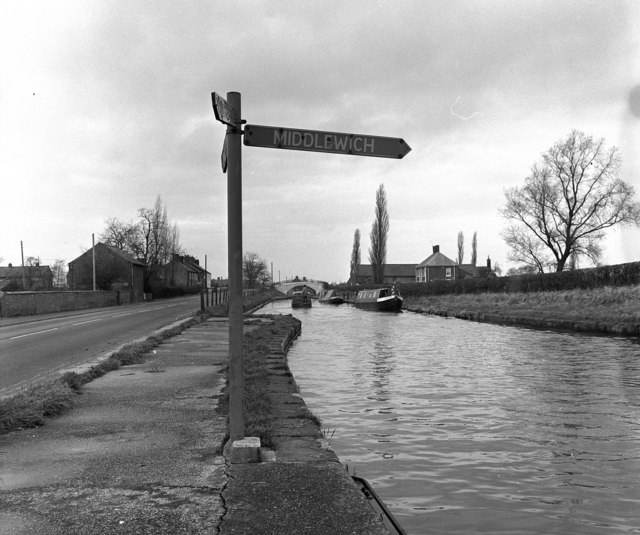
Sign indicating the Middlewich Branch at Barbridge Junction

Further hope was generated by the prospects of the Birmingham and Liverpool Junction Canal opening their line between Nantwich the Staffordshire and Worcestershire Canal at Autherley Junction, from where there was a connection into the Birmingham Canal Navigations. The need for the branch to Middlewich was now more important, as it would enable traffic on the new canal to reach Manchester. After the Earl of Bridgewater died in 1824, the company again approached the Trent and Mersey and the Bridgewater Canal about a possible link between Nantwich and Middlewich. The Bridgewater Trustees approved of the scheme, but the Trent and Mersey would not sanction it until the Birmingham and Liverpool Junction Canal was officially authorised by an Act of Parliament. This occurred in 1826, and the Ellesmere and Chester obtained their own Act to authorise their canal in 1827. The Trent and Mersey built the short Wardle Canal with one lock, to maintain control of the junction, and imposed high tolls for traffic using it, but the work went ahead, and the Middlewich Branch was opened on 1 September 1833, having cost £129,000.

The work included the building of transhipment warehouses and wharves at Barbridge Junction, although the branch saw little traffic until the Birmingham and Liverpool Junction Canal finally opened in 1835. Just ten years later, the two companies amalgamated, and the joint system became the Shropshire Union Canal network in 1846.

== Location ==
From Barbridge Junction, the original Chester Canal heads north-west, and is level for 2.8 miles (4.5 km), before the first of the two Bunbury Locks is reached on the descent to Chester. In the opposite direction, the canal is level for 5.5 miles (8.9 km) before it reaches the two Hack Green Locks. Along the Middlewich Branch, which heads north-east, the first lock is Cholmondeston Lock, 1.4 miles (2.3 km) from the junction. Just 2 miles (3.2 km) to the south of the junction on the main line is Hurleston Junction, where another branch of the Shropshire Union network, now rebranded the Llangollen Canal, turns off to head towards Llangollen and the Montgomery Canal.

== See also ==
- List of canal junctions in the United Kingdom

== Bibliography ==
- Cumberlidge, Jane (2009). Inland Waterways of Great Britain (8th Ed.). Imray Laurie Norie and Wilson. ISBN 978-1-84623-010-3.
- Hadfield, Charles (1985). The Canals of the West Midlands. David and Charles. ISBN 0-7153-8644-1.
- Nicholson (2006). Nicholson Waterways Guide (Vol 4): Four Counties and the Welsh Canals. Harper Collins. ISBN 0-00-721112-0.
