= Four Counties =

Four Counties may refer to:

- Siyi (Chinese: 四邑, 'Four Counties'), four former counties in the Pearl River Delta, China
- Heart Four Counties, a British local radio station serving Bedfordshire, Buckinghamshire, Hertfordshire and Northamptonshire
- Four Counties Ring, a canal ring in the English counties of Cheshire, Staffordshire, Shropshire and the West Midlands

== See also ==
- Four Countries
