= The Steam Mill, Chester =

Building in Chester, England

Coordinates: 53.1935°N 2.8799°W

The Steam Mill is a Grade II listed building located on Steam Mill Street in Chester, Cheshire, England. The mill was originally built in 1786, during the Georgian era.

== Location ==
Sitting on the banks of the Shropshire Union Canal, Steam Mill lies near both Chester Railway Station and Chester town centre.

Steam Mill is located approximately a seven-minute walk from Chester Railway Station, and around 10 minutes from Chester town centre.

== Architecture and fittings ==
While the building has been refurbished by James Brotherhood and Associates architects, it retains many of its original features, including exposed brickwork and wooden beams.

Steam Mill has a large, five-story atrium, shower and changing facilities, secure bike storage, lift access, on-site car parking, and private meeting rooms.

== History ==
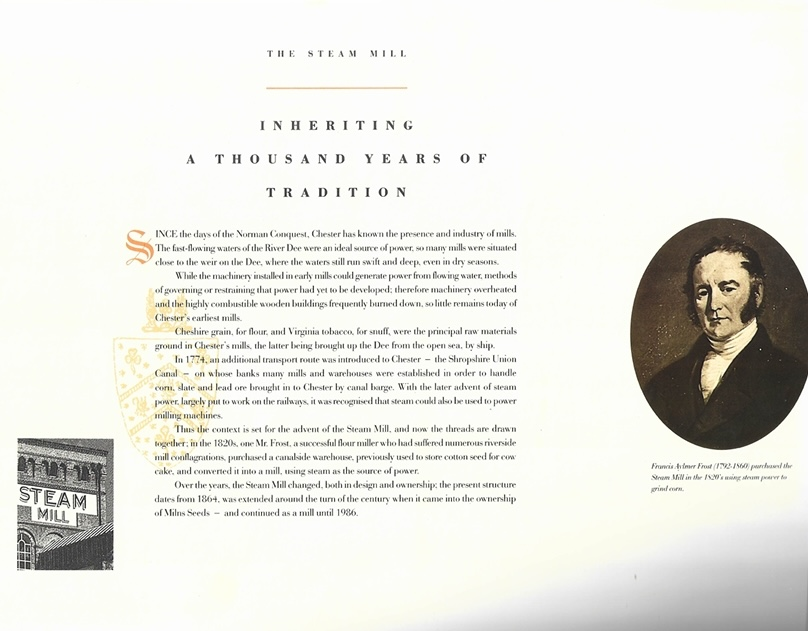
photo of information about Chester Steam Mill

Steam Mill was one of the first canal-side steam-powered mills, and was built on disused meadowland in 1786 for Chester Corn and Flour Merchants: Samuel Walker, George Walker, and Hugh Ley.

In 1819, the mill was sold to Frost & Sons, who are responsible for building the present structure that remains today. Frost & Sons had formerly owned the Dee Mills, which they acquired shortly after moving to Chester in 1818. Unfortunately, Dee Mills were ruined by a fire in 1819, which is thought to be the reason behind the move to Steam Mill In 1827, Frost & Sons replaced the original steam engine.

The ownership of the mill was handed to seed merchant David Miln in 1938. The building remained in use as a mill until 1986.

Today, Steam Mill is owned by Threadneedle Pensions Ltd, and managed by joint agents Legat Owen and Mason Owen, and serves as a hub for several offices and businesses, including thimbl.
