= Chester Canal Heritage Trust =

Waterway society in Cheshire, England

The Chester Canal Heritage Trust was started in 1997, to promote the canal in Chester, Cheshire, and educate about it. The canal was originally the Chester Canal, before becoming part of the Shropshire Union Canal network.

The objectives of the trust were stated as:

- Increasing awareness of the canal environment in the Chester area
- Training and education in waterway skills
- Researching history of boats and waterways
- Preservation of narrowboats
- Community involvement

The trust's objects were to advance the public education by engendering and fostering an awareness of the Chester Canal, its activities, heritage and environs, in local people and visitors by enabling people to crew heritage narrowboats; through the provision of training and education in the skills of the waterway environment; through the encouragement of exploration of the role of the waterways in the development of the surrounding area; through the support of the use and preservation of heritage narrowboats; through the development of recreational activities within the canal environment; and through the provision of a floating classroom for use by all in the North West.

The Trust was wound up in 2018.

== See also ==
- Canals of the United Kingdom
- History of the British canal system
