= Middlewich Branch =

Branch of the Shropshire Union Canal in Cheshire, England

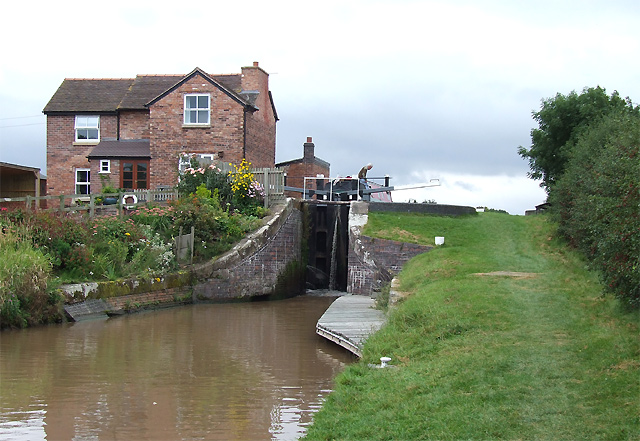
- The lock and cottage at Minshull

Specifications
- Maximum boat length: 72 ft 0 in (21.95 m)
- Maximum boat beam: 7 ft 0 in (2.13 m)
- Locks: 4
- Status: navigable
- Navigation authority: Canal and River Trust

History
- Original owner: Ellesmere and Chester Canal Company
- Date of act: 1827
- Date completed: 1833

Geography
- Start point: Middlewich
- End point: Barbridge
- Branch of: Shropshire Union Canal
- Connects to: Trent and Mersey Canal

The Middlewich Branch of the Shropshire Union Canal is located in Cheshire, in the north west of England, and runs between Middlewich, where it joins the Trent and Mersey Canal, and Barbridge Junction, where it joins the main line of the Shropshire Union Canal. It is 10 miles (16 km) long, and was planned as part of the Chester Canal, which was authorised in 1772, but the company ran out of money, and construction did not begin until 1827. The Trent and Mersey insisted that there should be no direct connection at Middlewich, and instead built the short Wardle Canal to join the two, charging large compensation tolls for traffic passing along it.

The canal became part of the Shropshire Union system in 1846, which was taken over by the London and North Western Railway within a year. Traffic on the branch was always limited by the compensation tolls, and it was not until 1888 that they were abolished. The canal was the location for trials with locomotive haulage of boats in 1888, using a narrow-gauge engine from Crewe railway works, but no further action was taken. The canal became part of the London Midland and Scottish Railway in 1923. The railway company closed 175 miles (282 km) of canals in 1944, but the Shropshire Union main line and the Middlewich Branch were spared, and passed into the jurisdiction of the British Waterways Board following nationalisation in 1948.

The canal follows a rural route through farmland across Cheshire, with a short urban section near the junction at Middlewich. Many of the structures are original, and consequently, most of them are grade II listed. There is no commercial traffic on the waterway, but transition to the leisure age has resulted in two marinas being constructed to provide moorings for pleasure craft.

== History ==
The idea of a canal to Middlewich was first proposed by the River Dee Company, who feared that the construction of the Trent and Mersey Canal, authorised by an Act of Parliament in 1766, would draw traffic away from the river and from Chester. They envisioned a canal from Chester to Middlewich, where it would link up with the Trent and Mersey, with a branch to Nantwich. There was little support, although the Duke of Bridgewater stated that he would not oppose the canal providing that there was no physical connection to the Trent and Mersey at Middlewich. The canal was authorised on 1 April 1772, and the company started to build a line to Nantwich, with locks 80 by 14.75 feet (24.38 by 4.50 m). The cost was much more than anticipated, and the canal was opened to Nantwich in mid-1779, after another Act of Parliament was obtained to raise more money. There was no money left for the Middlewich Canal, and a plan to save costs by building it with narrow locks did not find favour with the shareholders, and so no work was done.

With plans to link Nantwich to the Staffordshire and Worcestershire Canal at Autherley, to create the Birmingham and Liverpool Junction Canal, talks were again held with the Trent and Mersey Canal about a canal from Barbridge to Middlewich. The Trent and Mersey refused to consider the idea until the Birmingham and Liverpool Junction Canal was authorised, and then insisted that the canal should join a short branch from their canal, which they would build. This would become the Wardle Canal, and goods transferred along it had to pay high compensation tolls. The canal was authorised in 1827, one year after the Birmingham and Liverpool Junction Canal, and it was opened on 1 September 1833. The total cost, which included wharves and warehouses at Barbridge Junction, was £129,000, but trade was meagre until the new link to Autherley was completed some three years later.

Since the opening of the Ellesmere Canal in 1797, which linked Chester to the River Mersey at Ellesmere Port, the importance of Chester had gradually declined, while Ellesmere Port had correspondingly become more important. Tolls on the Middlewich Branch were initially maintained at a higher level than on the rest of the canal in order to avoid undercutting traffic on that route. In 1838, the canal carried 60,406 tons of iron to Ellesmere Port, and 10,370 tons along the Middlewich Branch, most of it travelling from North Wales to Manchester. Once the Birmingham and Liverpool Junction Canal was open, the route from Birmingham to Manchester via it and the Middlewich Branch was 5.25 miles (8.4 km) shorter and contained 30 less locks than the route using the Trent and Mersey Canal.

=== Shropshire Union era ===
The Ellesmere Canal and Chester Canal companies had amalgamated to become the Ellesmere and Chester Canal company in 1813, and on 8 May 1845, an Act of Parliament authorised amalgamation with the Birmingham and Liverpool Junction Canal. The Ellesmere and Chester name was retained for the joint company, but plans were already being made for the idea of the Shropshire Union Canal. By July, these plans had crystallised. The Montgomeryshire Canal, the Shrewsbury Canal and the Shropshire Canal network would become part of the new company. A number of new railways were proposed, and parts of the canal network would be converted to railways, but the canal link from Ellesmere Port to Middlewich via Barbridge was to be retained as a waterway. The company became the Shropshire Union Railways and Canal Company, and Acts to authorise three of the new railways were passed in 1846. The new company was independent for less than a year, as the London and North Western Railway (LNWR) offered them a perpetual lease in 1846, which was formalised by Act of Parliament in June 1847, although it was not fully implemented until March 1857.

The Shropshire Union attempted to deal with the problem of high tolls on the Wardle Canal by proposing a 327 yards (299 m) bypass in 1852, arguing that the Middlewich Branch was "almost useless" without it. However, the LNWR requested that they withdraw the bill from Parliament and they did so. A similar proposal was made in 1868, for a longer bypass, but this was defeated in the House of Lords. An experiment was carried out on the branch near Worleston in 1888. About 1 mile (1.6 km) of 18-inch (460 mm) railway track was laid alongside the canal, and a small locomotive from Crewe railway works was used to haul barges. The trials were suggested by the LNWR's mechanical engineer Francis Webb, and a report was produced by the Canal's engineer G. R. Jebb in 1889. Although the locomotive had successfully pulled two, four and then eight boats at speeds up to 7 mph (11 km/h; 6.1 kn), no further action was taken.

Some traffic on the branch was lost when the Anderton Lift was opened in 1875, providing a link from the Trent and Mersey to the River Weaver and the Manchester Ship Canal. The Shropshire Union continued to protest about the compensation tolls on the Wardle Canal until 1888, when the Railway and Canal Traffic Act was passed and they had to be abolished. The Shropshire Union company was absorbed by the LNWR in late 1922, and the LNWR became part of the London Midland and Scottish Railway (LMSR) within days of the amalgamation. In 1944, the LMSR obtained an Act of Parliament to close 175 miles (282 km) of the canals for which it was responsible, which included much of the Shropshire Union system, but the line from Ellesmere Port to Autherley and the branch to Middlewich were retained.

== Route ==
The canal is 10 miles (16 km) long, and rises from Middlewich to Barbridge through four locks. Apart from the first mile at Middlewich, where the canal is bordered by housing, the route is entirely rural, passing through farmland and woods, with superb views over the valley of the upper River Weaver. A large number of the structures of the canal are original, dating from the construction of the canal, and are grade II listed, beginning with the bridge which carries the Trent and Mersey towpath and Booth Lane over the entrance to the branch. It is constructed of brown brickwork, and carries the inscription "Wardle Canal 1829". Both Wardle Lock, which raises the level of the canal by 9.75 feet (2.97 m), and the adjacent lock cottage are listed structures. Bridges 31, 30, and 28 are all made of blue-brown and blue bricks, with a skewed basket arch. A single-arched aqueduct then carries the canal over the A530 Nantwich road, and another crosses the River Wheelock immediately afterwards.

The approach to Stanthorne Lock, which raises the level by 11.1 feet (3.4 m) is through a cattle bridge built of red bricks laid in an English garden wall bond, with stone coping and large retaining walls which end in piers with pyramidal stone caps. The relative peace of the branch is disturbed at bridge 22A, which carries the West Coast Main Line railway over the canal, but beyond the bridge, the views over the Weaver Valley and of Winsford Top Flash open out. After several more listed bridges, the canal passes the village of Church Minshull and then crosses over the River Weaver carried on an aqueduct with three arches, a large circular central arch with smaller arches for flood relief on both sides, and curved wing walls.

Nanneys Bridge carries the B5074 road over the canal just before Minshull Lock. It is made of brick with a single basket arch, but the parapets are not original, as they have been rebuilt. The lock raises the canal by 11 feet (3.4 m), and is grade II listed because it shows few signs of having been altered since its construction. Bridge 5A carries the railway line from Crewe to Chester over the canal, and there is a large marina shortly afterwards, followed by Cholmondeston lock, which raises the level by 11.25 feet (3.43 m). Benyon's Bridge, Sandholes Bridge, and Rutters Bridge are the final three accommodation bridges, before the canal arrives at Barbridge Junction, where a graceful roving bridge made of red and blue brick with an elliptical arch, carries the towpath for the main line over the branch.

== 2018 bank failure ==
On 16 March 2018 a section of the bank failed next to the aqueduct carrying the canal over the River Wheelock. The canal was drained between Stanthorne Lock and Wardle Lock resulting in the stranding of 20 boats. The Canal and River Trust repaired the breach with the help of hundreds of volunteers and two major civil engineering companies at a cost of £3 million. The repaired branch was officially re-opened on Friday 21 December 2018.

== Points of interest ==
Point	Coordinates (Links to map resources)	OS Grid Ref	Notes
Jn with Trent and Mersey Canal	53.1879°N 2.4408°W	SJ706657	
Stanthorne Lock	53.1880°N 2.4619°W	SJ692657	
West Coast Main Line bridge	53.1764°N 2.4828°W	SJ678644	
River Weaver aqueduct	53.1270°N 2.5025°W	SJ664589	
Minshull Lock	53.1227°N 2.5185°W	SJ654585	
Cholmondeston Lock	53.1144°N 2.5487°W	SJ633576	
Barbridge Junction	53.1091°N 2.5792°W	SJ613570	

== See also ==
- Canals of the United Kingdom
- History of the British canal system
- Four Counties Ring - a canal cruising ring that includes the Middlewich Branch

== Bibliography ==
- Cumberlidge, Jane (2009). Inland Waterways of Great Britain (8th Ed.). Imray Laurie Norie and Wilson. ISBN 978-1-84623-010-3.
- Hadfield, Charles (1985). The Canals of the West Midlands. David and Charles. ISBN 0-7153-8644-1.
- Nicholson (2006). Nicholson Guide Vol 4 - Four Counties and the Welsh Canals. Harper Collins. ISBN 978-0-00-721112-8.
