= Hurleston Junction =

Canal junction in Cheshire, England

Coordinates: 53.0939°N 2.5598°W

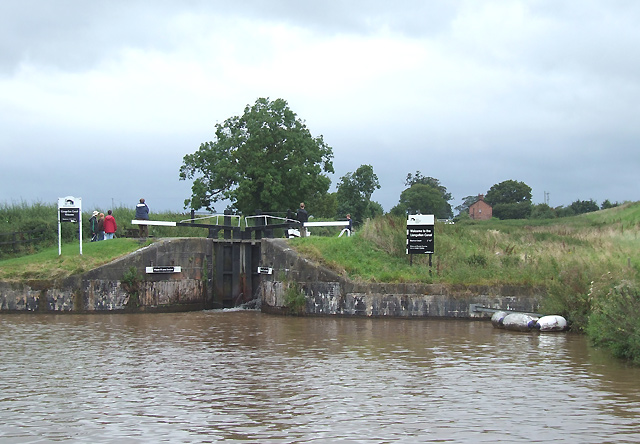
- Hurleston Junction: the Llangollen Canal begins here with a flight of four locks raising the water level more than 34 feet (10.4 metres)
- Interactive map of Hurleston Junction

Specifications
- Status: Open
- Navigation authority: Canal & River Trust

History
- Date completed: 1796

Hurleston Junction (grid reference SJ625553) is the name of the canal junction where the Llangollen Canal terminates and meets the Shropshire Union Canal main line at Hurleston, Cheshire, England.

== History ==
The Chester Canal was planned as a broad canal running from Chester to Middlewich, with a branch to Nantwich. It was authorised by an act of Parliament, the Chester Canal Act 1772 (12 Geo. 3. c. 75), but the plans changed and the main line was built from Chester to Nantwich. Lack of finance prevented the construction of a branch to Middlewich. Commercially, the canal was a failure, and after opening in 1779, it lasted eight years until the company collapsed. However, it was reopened three years later in 1790, as the proposed construction of the Ellesmere Canal would make it part of a larger network, and might enable the Middlewich Branch, which would connect with the Trent and Mersey Canal to be built.

The Ellesmere Canal as first envisioned was a huge undertaking, running from the River Mersey to the River Dee and on to Shrewsbury, with branches connecting Ruabon, Llangollen, Bersham, Llanymynech and possibly Whitchurch and Wem. William Jessop was asked to be engineer, and proposed some variations to the route. Opposing factions amalgamated in February 1793, and the Ellesmere and Chester Canal Act 1793 (33 Geo. 3. 91) was obtained in April, which resulted in a line from Ellesmere Port to a junction with the Chester Canal opening in January 1797. Work started in early 1794 on a line from Hordley, near Frankton, to Llanymynech, after which it would be joined by the proposed Montgomeryshire Canal at Carreghofa. Llanymynech had extensive limestone quarries, which would provide trade for the canal. The branch was open by autumn 1796, and the first commercial use of the junction was thus in late 1796.

The junction was originally a meeting point between the Chester Canal main line and the Ellesmere Canal branch to Llanymynech. In 1813, the two companies amalgamated, to become the Ellesmere and Chester Canal. The Birmingham and Liverpool Junction Canal was authorised by the Birmingham and Liverpool Junction Canal Act 1826 (7 Geo. 4. c. xcv), which would link Nantwich to the Staffordshire and Worcestershire Canal at Autherley Junction near Wolverhampton. It opened in 1835, In 1845, a further amalgamation took place with this company, and shortly afterwards, it was renamed to become the Shropshire Union Canal. The Llangollen Canal was originally the Llangollen Branch, running from Frankton Junction on the Llanymynech Branch to Llangollen. The Llanymynech Branch closed below Frankton in 1936, following a breach at Perry Aqueduct. Much of the Shropshire Union system was closed by the owners, the London Midland and Scottish Railway, in 1944, but the main line was retained, and the line to Llangollen was retained as a water feeder. The whole length from Hurleston Junction to Llangollen has been rebranded as the Llangollen Canal, and the canal below Frankton Junction, all of which is now called the Montgomeryshire Canal, is being restored.

== Location ==
From the junction, the Chester Canal runs to the north-west, and is level for 4.1 miles (6.6 km) to the two staircase locks at Bunbury. Barbridge Junction, where the Middlewich Branch turns off, was eventually built in 1833, is 1.3 miles (2.1 km) from the junction. Heading in the other direction towards Wolverhampton, the canal is level for 10.7 miles (17.2 km) to the bottom lock of the 15-lock Audlem flight. A roving bridge carries the towpath over the canal just to the south of the junction.

Immediately after the junction, the Llangollen Canal rises through the four Hurleston locks, which raise the level of the canal by 34.25 feet (10.44 m), beyond which the canal is crossed by the A51 road. To the north of the locks is Hurleston Reservoir, which is filled by water which passes along the canal from the Horseshoe Falls at Llantysilio. As well as supplying the canal, the reservoir is used for drinking water, holding 85 million gallons (390 Ml). Around 12 million gallons (55 Ml) flow along the canal each day to supply it.

== See also ==
- Canals of the United Kingdom
- History of the British canal system
- Listed buildings in Hurleston
