= Shropshire Union Canal =

Canal in North West England

Coordinates: 53°17′N 2°53′W

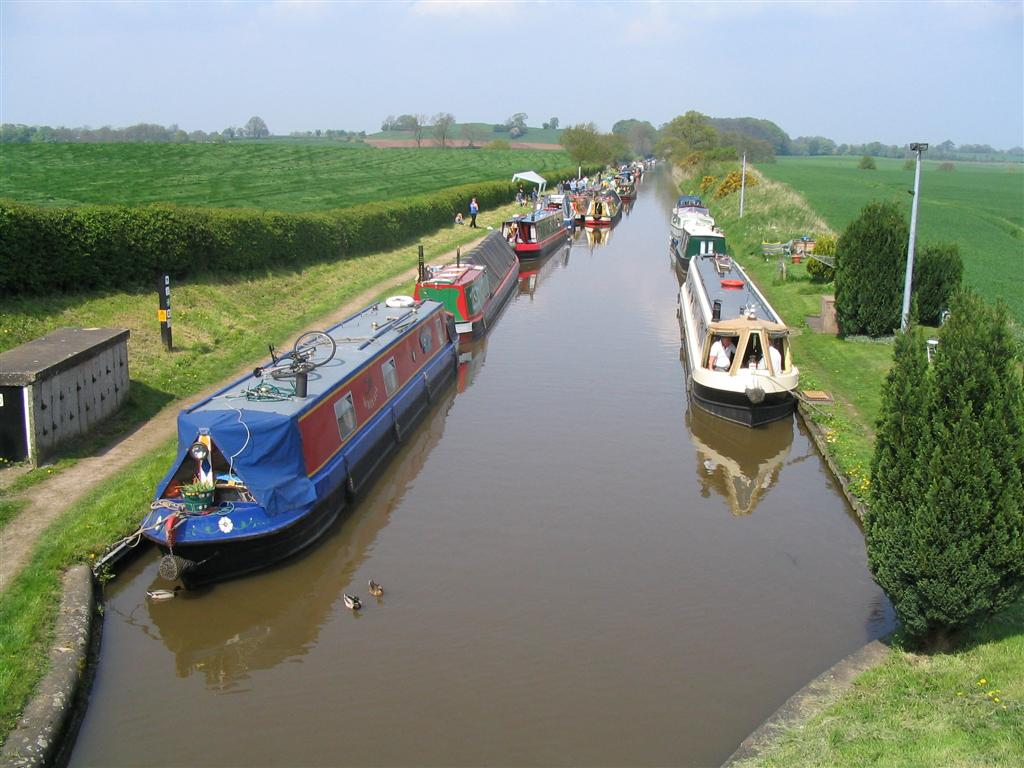
- The Shropshire Union Canal near Norbury Junction
- Interactive map of Shropshire Union Canal

Specifications
- Status: Open and navigable
- Navigation authority: Canal and River Trust

History
- Date completed: 9 March 1835

Geography
- Branch(es): Middlewich Branch (open); Shrewsbury and Newport Canal (disused)
- Connects to: Llangollen Canal

The Shropshire Union Canal, sometimes nicknamed the "Shroppie", is a navigable canal in England. It is the modern name for a part of the Shropshire Union Railways and Canal Company network. In the leisure age, two of the branches of that network have also been renamed. These are the Llangollen and Montgomery canals, both of which lie partially in Wales.

The canal lies in the counties of Staffordshire, Shropshire and Cheshire in the north-west English Midlands. It links the canal system of the West Midlands, at Wolverhampton, with the River Mersey and Manchester Ship Canal at Ellesmere Port, Cheshire, 66 miles (106 km) distant.

The "Shropshire Union main line" runs southeast from Ellesmere Port on the River Mersey to the Staffordshire and Worcestershire Canal at Autherley Junction in Wolverhampton. Other links are to the Llangollen Canal at Hurleston Junction, the Middlewich Branch at Barbridge Junction, which itself connects via the Wardle Canal to the Trent and Mersey Canal, and the River Dee branch in Chester. With two connections to the Trent and Mersey via the Middlewich Branch and the Staffordshire and Worcestershire Canal, the Shropshire Union is part of a circular and rural holiday route called the Four Counties Ring.

The Shropshire Union main line was the last trunk narrow canal route to be built in England. It was not completed until 1835 and was the last major civil engineering accomplishment of Thomas Telford. The name "Shropshire Union" comes from the amalgamation of the various component companies, including the Ellesmere Canal, the Chester Canal, the Birmingham and Liverpool Junction Canal, and the Montgomeryshire Canal, that came together to form the Shropshire Union Railways and Canal Company in 1847. The main line between Nantwich and Autherley Junction was almost built as a railway although eventually it was decided to construct it as a waterway.

== Route ==
=== Wirral Line ===
The canal starts from Ellesmere Port on the River Mersey traversing the Wirral peninsula to Chester. Ellesmere Port was originally the hamlet of Netherpool, but the new name was adopted around 1796, as it expanded with the canal construction. This stretch of contour canal, which was completed in 1797, was originally part of the unfinished Ellesmere Canal. The industrial waterway was intended to connect the Port of Liverpool on the River Mersey to the River Severn at Shrewsbury via the North East Wales Coalfields. However, by 1800 William Jessop the canal's engineer had decided that circumstances had changed, and that the proposed 16-mile (26 km) mainline from Chester to Trevor Basin near Wrexham was now uneconomical. The northern Wirral section was already joined to the pre-existing Chester Canal, and both eventually become part of the Shropshire Union network.

=== Chester Canal ===
In Chester, from the top of the arm leading down to the Dee, the SU follows the old Chester Canal. This was conceived as a canal from Chester to Middlewich, where it would join the Trent and Mersey Canal, with a branch to Nantwich. Construction started in 1772, but progress was slow. The plans changed, become a main line from Chester to Nantwich with a branch to Middlewich. Nantwich was reached in 1779, but building of the Middlewich branch would not start for another 54 years. The enterprise was a financial disaster, and the company failed in 1787, but plans for the Ellesmere Canal injected new hope into the project, and it was repaired in 1790, in the belief that the Middlewich Branch might then be started.

The canal passes alongside the city walls of Chester in a deep, vertical red sandstone cutting. After Chester, there are only a few locks as the canal ascends to the nearly flat Chester Plain, passes to the north of Beeston Castle, and the junctions at Barbridge and Hurleston to arrive at Nantwich basin, the original terminus of the Chester Canal. At Barbridge, the Middlewich Branch of the SU goes northeast to Middlewich on the Trent and Mersey Canal (via the tiny Wardle Canal). This was the original planned main line of the Chester Canal, but was only authorised in 1827 and completed in 1833.

At Hurleston, the old Ellesmere canal from Frankton Junction joins the old Chester Canal. The Ellesmere Canal had built canals in three directions from Frankton, north-westwards to Pontcysyllte, south-westwards to Llanymynech and south-eastwards to Weston, part of their line to Shrewsbury. They started building a line towards Whitchurch in 1797, and reached Tilstock Park in 1804, still 4 miles (6.4 km) short of Whitchurch. By 1800 the company had decided that a line from Pontcysyllte directly to Chester would never be economic. The connection between Tilstock Park and Hurleston was authorised in 1802, and opened in 1805. A navigable feeder from Pontcysyllte via Llangollen to the River Dee at Llantisilio was authorised in 1804, and the water began flowing in 1808. The Shrewsbury Branch never progressed beyond Weston. The Ellesmere and Chester companies amalgamated in 1813. The canal from Hurleston eventually became the Llangollen Branch of the Shropshire Union, and is now known as the Llangollen Canal. From Frankton Junction, the line to Llanymynech is now part of the Montgomery Canal, and is still being restored, while the Weston Branch was abandoned and parts have become a nature reserve.

=== Birmingham and Liverpool Junction Canal ===
The odd angle between Nantwich basin and the next stretch of the Shropshire Union is a result of a junction with the newer Birmingham and Liverpool Junction Canal, built as a narrow canal to connect Nantwich to the Staffordshire and Worcestershire Canal at Autherley Junction, near Wolverhampton. It was completed in 1835, and provided a direct link between Liverpool and the industrial Midlands. The canal included a branch from Norbury Junction, also opened in 1835, which ran south-west through Newport to connect with the Shrewsbury Canal at Wappenshall Junction. During the planning stages, there was a lot of support for building a railway along a similar line to the canal, but Thomas Telford was not convinced, and the canal scheme prevailed.

After Nantwich basin, a long sweeping embankment incorporating an aqueduct carries the canal across the main A534 Nantwich to Chester road. After crossing the upper reaches of the River Weaver on an aqueduct, the canal climbs out of the Cheshire Plain by means of a flight of 15 locks at Audlem, rising over 90 feet (27 m). Shortly afterwards, five more locks at Adderley raise the level by another 31 feet (9.4 m), before the canal passes through the eastern suburbs of the town of Market Drayton in Shropshire. Another five locks at Tyrley raise the level by 33 feet (10 m) and it enters the Woodseaves Cutting, a deep cutting through rock which is named after the nearby hamlet of Woodseaves, Shropshire. It is the longest canal cutting in Britain, at around 1.8 miles (2.9 km), and is up to 69 feet (21 m) deep. Because of its geological interest, it is a Site of Special Scientific Interest.

Further south there are substantial engineering works. Shebdon Embankment carries the canal along the southern edge of the Staffordshire village of Knighton, with an aqueduct over a minor road at its southern end. Grub Street Cutting follows as the canal skirts the village of Woodseaves in Staffordshire, while at Norbury Junction there is the stub of the branch to Wappensall. There is another aqueduct over a minor road to the south of Norbury at the start of the 1-mile-long (1.6 km) Shelmore Embankment. Repeated soil slippage during construction meant that this was the last part of the Birmingham and Liverpool Junction Canal to be opened to traffic. The lengthy embankment is equipped with flood gates at both ends to prevent loss of water should the canal be breached in this area. During World War II these gates were kept closed at night because of the risk of bomb damage. At Gnosall the canal enters the 81-yard (74 m) Cowley Tunnel. Originally the tunnel was planned to be 690 yards (630 m) long, but after the rocky first 81 yards (74 m), the ground was unstable, and the remaining length was opened out to form the present narrow and steep-sided Cowley Cutting.

After 17 miles (27 km) of lock-free cruising, the canal climbs its last lock at Wheaton Aston to reach the 11-mile (18 km) summit level, fed by the Belvide Reservoir just north of Brewood. The reservoir is managed as a nature reserve by the Royal Society for the Protection of Birds, and consequently no sailing is permitted on it, although it is used for fishing. Close to the reservoir, Stretton Aqueduct carries the canal over the course of Watling Street, once a Roman road but now known as the A5.

The Shropshire Union terminates at Autherley Junction on the Staffs and Worcester Canal. Immediately before the junction is a very shallow stop lock built to prevent the loss of water to the new rival canal from the preexisting Staffordshire and Worcestershire Canal. Unusually, the Birmingham and Liverpool Junction Canal's summit level was designed to be a few inches lower than the older canal, so the newer canal gains a small amount of water each time the lock is cycled, the reverse of the practice usually insisted on by canal companies as a condition for not opposing the construction of a newer one.

=== Onward links ===
The link with the Staffs and Worcester provides a choice of onward journeys:

- Northwards, the S&W meets the Trent and Mersey at Great Haywood junction – allowing journeys east to the Leicester Branch of the Grand Union Canal (or the Trent) or north to the Potteries, Manchester, and the Pennines.
- Southwards, Aldersley Junction is only a mile away, connecting to the BCN Main Line of the Birmingham Canal Navigations (the maze of canals between Wolverhampton and Birmingham) and onwards to the Grand Union Canal main line and London.
- Beyond Aldersley, the S&W is a very popular holiday route down to the River Severn at Stourport.

== Gallery ==
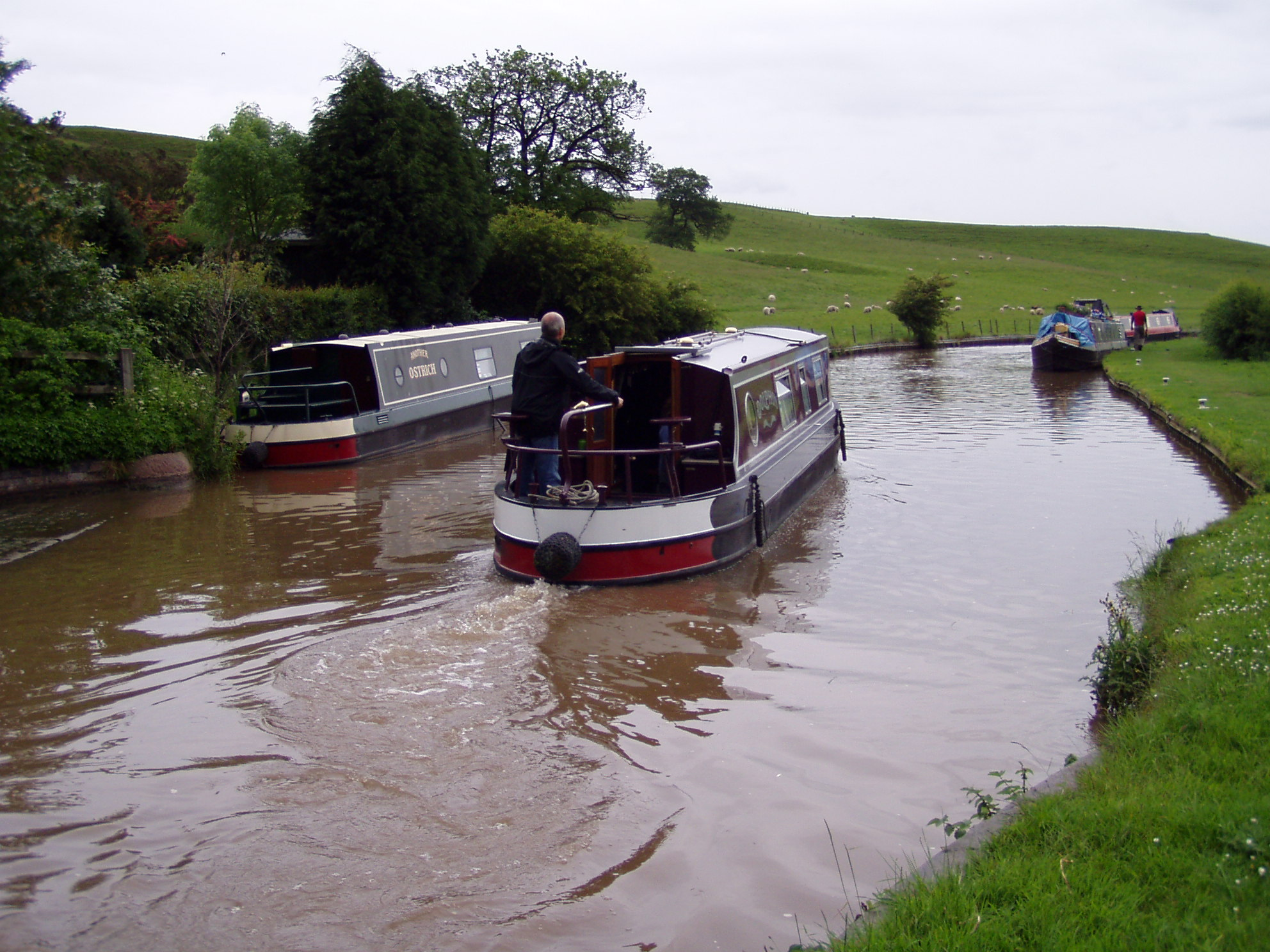
Canal boats on the Chester Canal near Beeston

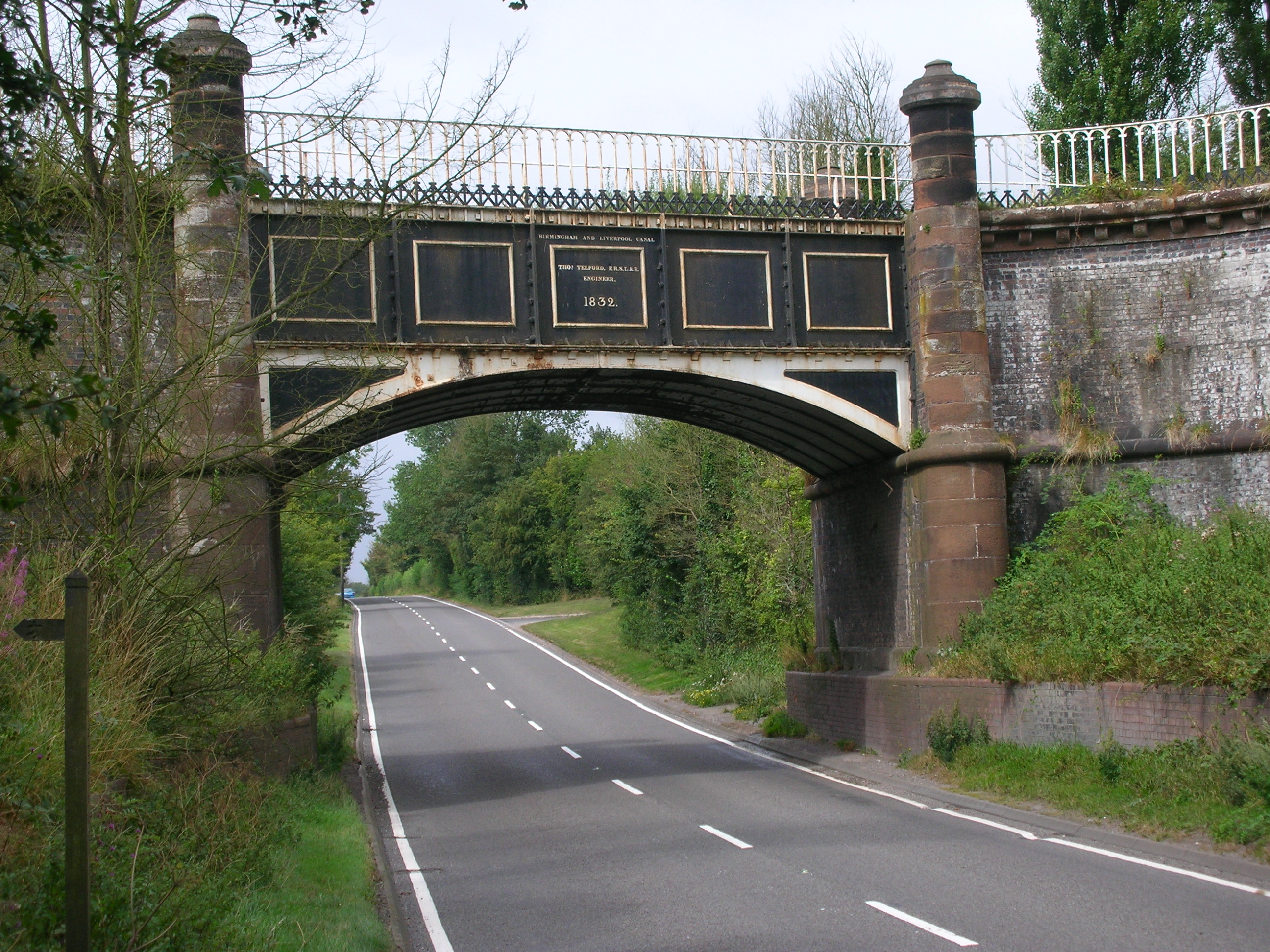
A5 aqueduct

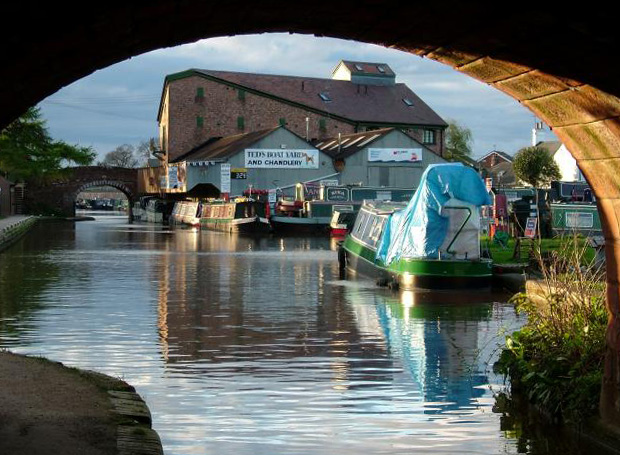
Betton Mill on the Shropshire Union Canal at Market Drayton

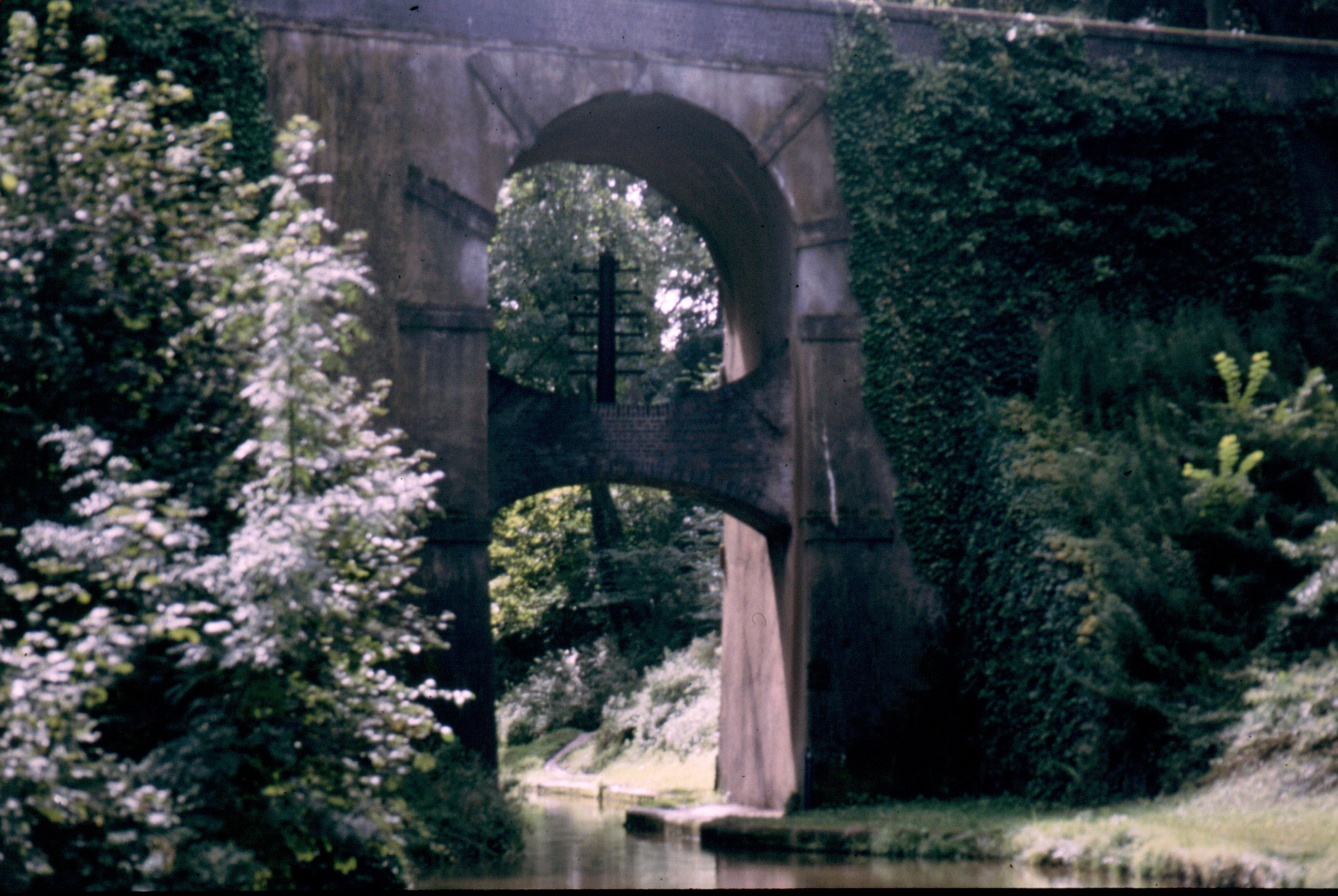
The well-known bridge with the smallest telegraph pole.

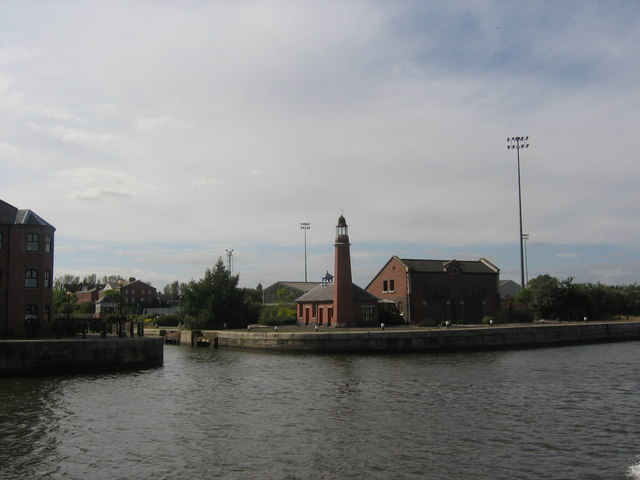
Manchester Ship Canal meets Shropshire Union Canal at Ellesmere Port

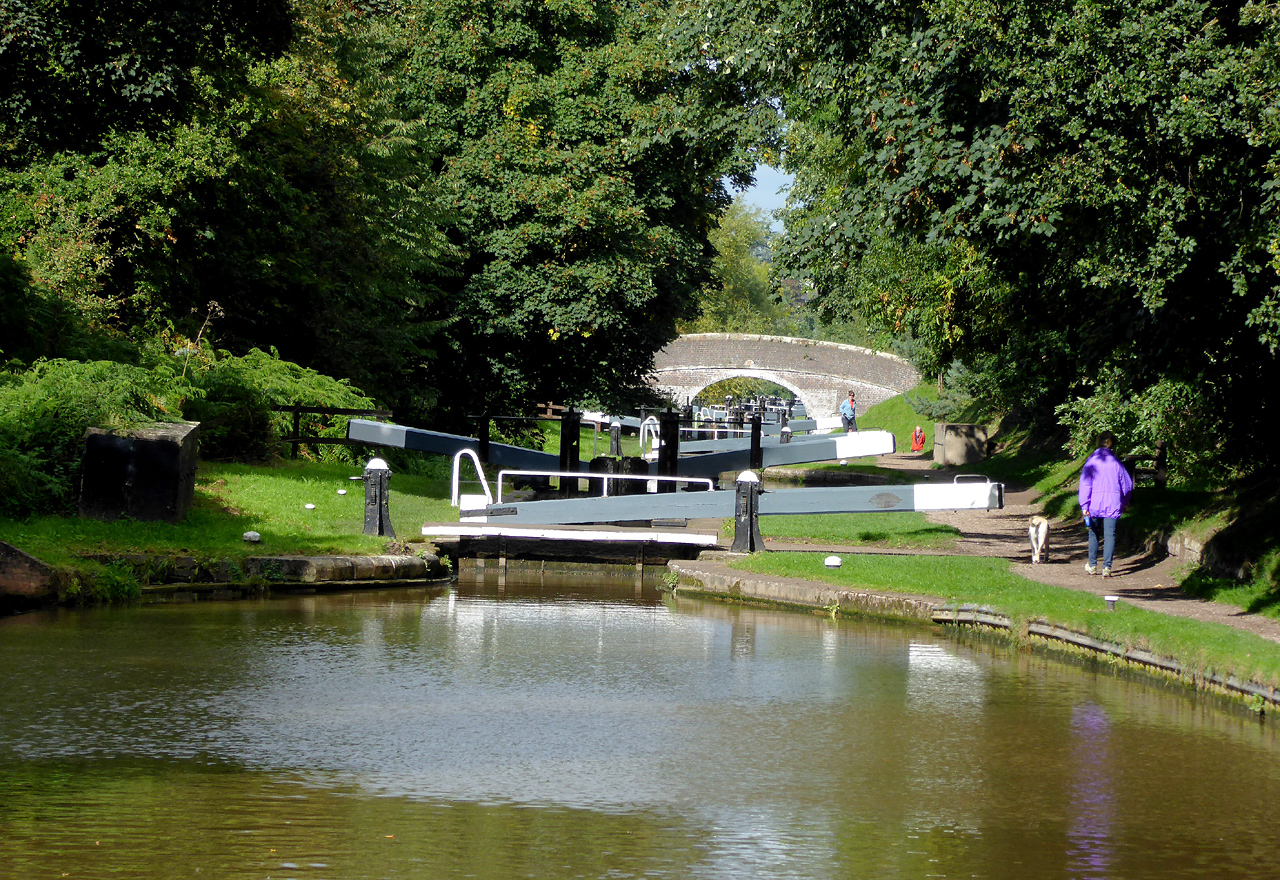
Locks in Audlem

== Formation of the "Shropshire Union" company ==
The Shropshire Union Railways and Canal Company was formed in 1846. The Ellesmere and Chester canals had amalgamated in 1813, and the absorption of the Birmingham and Liverpool Junction Canal by the Ellesmere and Chester Company was authorised by the Ellesmere and Chester Canal Company Act 1845 (8 & 9 Vict. c. ii). A further Act of Parliament, passed in 1846, changed the name of the company to the Shropshire Union Railways and Canal Company and authorised the acquisition of the Shrewsbury Canal and other canals in the east Shropshire network, linking modern-day Telford with the River Severn to the south at Coalport. In 1847 the London and North Western Railway Company offered to lease the Shropshire Union network, and in exchange for giving up any aspirations to build more railways, the directors of the canal were given a free hand to manage the canals as they thought fit.

== Breaches and bank failures ==
=== September 1945 ===
On 7 September 1945, the bank of the Llangollen branch of the canal collapsed near Sun Bank Halt, Denbighshire. The escaping water washed away a 40-yard (37 m) section of the trackbed of the Ruabon to Barmouth railway line, which lay around 60 feet (18 m) below. As a result, a Great Western Railway mail and freight train was derailed, killing the driver and injuring two others. The train was destroyed by the subsequent fire, with the exception of a brake van, and mail valued at up to £200,000 was lost, although some mailbags were recovered.

An inquiry held later in September 1945 determined that a 15 feet (4.6 m) breach in the canal bank had washed away the railway embankment beneath it. The canal inspector reported that this section of the canal was well maintained, owing to its close proximity to the railway. A canal worker stated that he had passed the site the previous day and had observed neither water leakage nor any movement of the bank, adding that he had never known leaks to occur there during his 15 years of service. Several witnesses spoke of seeing an unusual pool of water in a field below the embankment the day before, although did not witness water falling from the canal or embankment. The inquiry found no evidence of criminal negligence and concluded in October that the train driver's death was the result of misadventure.

=== March 2018 ===
A 70 metres (230 ft) section of northern bank of the canal failed on 16 March 2018 at an aqueduct over the River Wheelock, near Middlewich, leaving 15 to 20 boats stranded on a 1.3 kilometres (0.81 mi) stretch between Wardle Lock and Stanthorne Lock. One boat close to the 12 metres (39 ft) deep hole had to be evacuated, and minor damage to one local's garden was recorded. According to the Canal and River Trust, the breach was caused by a member of the public leaving open a paddle gate on a lock, allowing water into the section of the canal, and causing it to overflow. After emergency repairs costing £3 million, the Middlewich branch of the canal reopened on 21 December 2018.

=== December 2025 ===
In the early hours of 22 December 2025 a bank failure appeared under the Hurleston to Frankton section of the Llangollen Canal and drained an estimated 1 million imperial gallons (4.5 million litres) of water. Two narrowboats were left at the bottom of the failure with two more left on the edge. The residents of these four boats were safely evacuated and no casualties were recorded. The Canals and Rivers Trust have closed the canal between bridges 31A and 28 (Lock 6 Grindley Brook Locks).

== Restoration ==
To promote the interest in, use of, and restoration of parts of the Shropshire Union Canal, the Shropshire Union Canal Society was formed in 1966. Today their main restoration activities are on the Montgomery Canal, which is slowly being restored into Wales.

== See also ==
- Canals of the United Kingdom
- History of the British canal system
- Four Counties Ring – a canal cruising ring that includes part of the Shropshire Union

== Sources ==
- Hadfield, Charles (1985). The Canals of the West Midlands. David and Charles. ISBN 978-0-7153-8644-6.
- Nicholson (2006). Nicholson Guides Vol 4: Four Counties and the Welsh Canals. Harper Collins. ISBN 978-0-00-721112-8.
- Vaughan, Adrian (1989). Obstruction Danger. Wellingborough: Patrick Stephens. ISBN 978-1-85260-055-6.
