= Chester Canal =

Canal in Cheshire, England

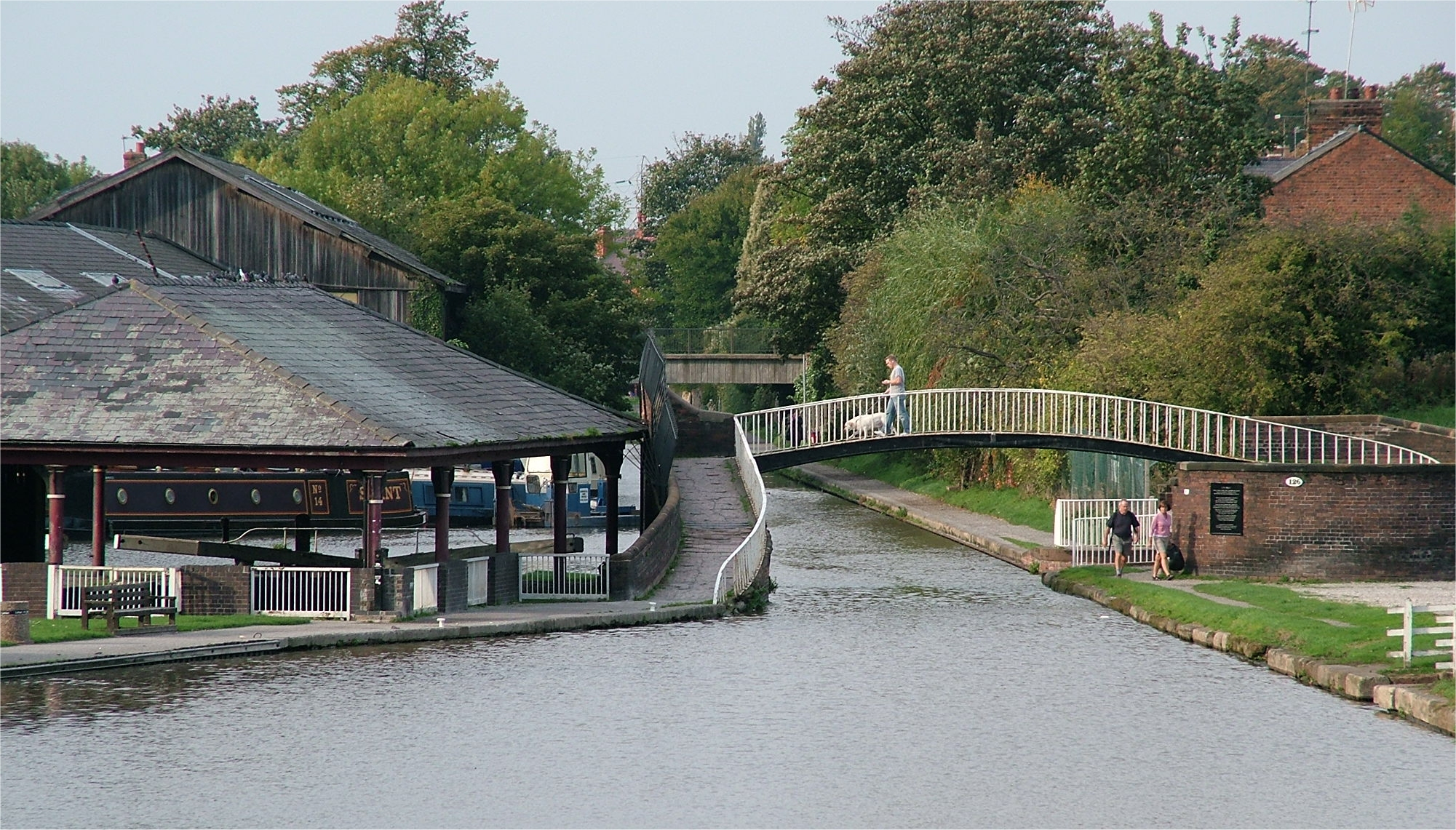
- Chester Canal basin, on the Wirral Line of the Ellesmere Canal, at Raymond Street, near the junction with the Chester Canal and the River Dee

Specifications
- Maximum boat length: 72 ft 0 in (21.95 m) (originally 80 ft 0 in or 24.38 m)
- Maximum boat beam: 9 ft 0 in (2.74 m) (originally 14 ft 9 in or 4.50 m)
- Locks: 14
- Status: Navigable
- Navigation authority: Canal & River Trust

History
- Original owner: Chester Canal Company
- Date of act: 1772
- Date of first use: 1779

Geography
- Start point: Nantwich
- End point: Chester
- Branch of: Now part of Shropshire Union

The Chester Canal is an English canal linking the south Cheshire town of Nantwich with the River Dee at Chester. It was intended to link Chester to Middlewich, with a branch to Nantwich, but the Trent and Mersey Canal were unco-operative about a junction at Middlewich, and so the route to Nantwich was opened in 1779. There were also difficulties negotiating with the River Dee Company, and with no possibility of through traffic, the canal was uneconomic. Part of it was closed in 1787, when Beeston staircase locks collapsed, and there was no money to fund repairs. When the Ellesmere Canal was proposed in 1790, the company saw it as a ray of hope, and somehow managed to keep the struggling canal open. The Ellesmere Canal provided a link to the River Mersey at Ellesmere Port from 1797, and the fortunes of the Chester Canal began to improve.

The Ellesmere Canal was also building branches in North Wales, which were intended to link up to the River Dee at Chester, but eventually linked to the Chester Canal at Hurleston Junction, just to the north of Nantwich, in 1805. The canal then became the middle section of a much longer and more profitable canal. The two companies merged in 1813, becoming the Ellesmere and Chester Canal. When the Birmingham and Liverpool Junction Canal was proposed in 1826, which would provide a link from Nantwich to Wolverhampton and the Birmingham canal system, the company saw it as an opportunity to build the Middlewich Branch, which would provide a connection to Manchester and the Potteries. The branch opened in 1833, and the Junction Canal opened in 1835. Amalgamation followed in 1845, with the new company retaining the name of the Ellesmere and Chester Canal. The following year, the Shropshire Union Railways and Canal Company was formed from the Ellesmere and Chester company, which also took over a number of canals which joined theirs. Plans to convert some of the canals to railways were put on hold in 1847, when the canal company was leased to the London and North Western Railway. Under railway control, the canals continued to operate successfully, but decline set in during the 20th century, and when many of the adjoining canals were closed in 1944, the sections which had been the Ellesmere and Chester Canal and the Birmingham and Liverpool Junction Canal, together with the Middlewich Branch, were retained.

The canals were nationalised in 1948, and long-distance commercial traffic had all but ended by 1958. In 1963, the British Waterways Board was formed and the canal ceased to be operated by railway interests for the first time in over 100 years. It was designated as a cruising waterway in the Transport Act 1968, with potential for leisure use, and since then, it has been enjoyed by recreational boaters, by walkers and by fishermen. In 1997, the Chester Canal Heritage Trust was formed and has worked to promote the canal and its heritage. Responsibility for the canal passed from British Waterways to the newly formed Canal & River Trust in 2012.

== History ==
In 1771, the people of Chester, fearing that the construction of the Trent and Mersey Canal would divert trade away from their city to Liverpool, announced in the Press that they would be applying to build a canal between Middlewich, on the Trent and Mersey, and Chester. The city was at the time served by the River Dee, and the River Dee Company had recently spent £80,000 on improvements to the river, but they realised that without a connection to the growing canal network, there was little future for the river or the Port of Chester. The idea had first been raised three years earlier, when merchants suggested a line from the Trent and Mersey to near Runcorn. There were no objections from the Corporation of Liverpool, but the canal company was non-committal. By 1770, the plans were a little clearer, with a main line from Chester to Middlewich and a branch to Nantwich. Although the Corporation of Chester subscribed £100 towards the scheme, and the societies and clubs of Chester put up another £2,000, there was little enthusiasm for it. Neither the Weaver Navigation nor the Trent and Mersey were supportive, as both might have lost some trade if the canal were built, and when the Duke of Bridgewater was approached for support, he replied that provided the canal did not physically link with the Trent and Mersey at Middlewich, he would not oppose the plans. Despite attempts at flattery, the Duke would not alter his position, and so the company promoting the bill in Parliament began with a serious disadvantage.

Chester Canal Act 1772
- Act of Parliament
- Parliament of Great Britain
- Long title: An Act for making a navigable Cut or Canal from the River Dee, within the Liberties of the City of Chester, to or near Middlewich and Nantwich, in the County of Chester.
- Citation: 12 Geo. 3. c. 75
- Territorial extent: Great Britain

Dates
- Royal assent: 1 April 1772
- Commencement: 21 January 1772 (Note: Start of session.)
- Repealed: 21 May 1813
Other legislation
Amended by	Chester Canal Act 1777; Chester Canal Act 1778
Repealed by	Ellesmere and Chester Canals Unification Act 1813

Status: Repealed

Text of statute as originally enacted

The bill became an act of Parliament, Chester Canal Act 1772 (12 Geo. 3. c. 75), on 1 April 1772, authorising the construction of a canal to run "from the River Dee, within the liberties of the city of Chester, to or near Middlewich and Nantwich". The act allowed the company to raise £42,000 by issuing £100 shares, and an additional £20,000 if necessary. Of this, only £28,000 had been subscribed at the time of the act, but construction began near Chester, with Samual Weston acting as engineer and John Lawton working as his assistant. Weston had previously worked as a surveyor, and had been involved in excavating canals as a contractor, but had no experience of managing a major engineering project. The Mayor of Chester cut the first sod at the end of April. There were concerns that while the canal was being constructed past Northgate Gardens, prisoners from Northgate Prison might escape, and the company had to give a bond against this possibility. The canal was conceived as a broad canal, designed with locks which were 80 feet (24 m) by 14 feet 9 inches (4.50 m) suitable for broad-beam barges. Most of the Trent and Mersey Canal north of the proposed junction was suitable for barges which were 14 feet (4.3 m) wide, but the final three locks in Middlewich, and all of those south of the junction, are only suitable for 7-foot (2.1 m) narrow-beam barges.

The project was hampered by financial and engineering problems, and so progress was slow. At the Chester end, the River Dee Company had managed to insert a clause into the act of Parliament which restricted the width of the final lock into the river to 7 feet (2.1 m). Although the lock was built, and some narrow boats capable of using it were constructed, agreement was reached on a wider connection after four years of argument. The solution adopted was a single pair of gates, which provided a 15-foot-wide (4.6 m) entrance into a basin from which the canal rose to the Northgate level. The land on which the basin was built was owned by the River Dee Company, who therefore charged tolls on all traffic using it. In 1774, part of an aqueduct collapsed, and had to be dismantled and repaired.

Chester Canal Act 1777
- Act of Parliament
- Parliament of Great Britain
- Long title: An Act for varying and enlarging the Powers of an Act, made in the Twelfth Year of the Reign of His present Majesty, for making a navigable Cut or Canal from the River Dee, within the Liberties of the City of Chester, to or near Middlewich and Nantwich, in the County of Chester.
- Citation: 17 Geo. 3. c. 67
- Territorial extent: Great Britain

Dates
- Royal assent: 2 June 1777
- Commencement: 31 October 1776
- Repealed: 21 May 1813
Other legislation
Amends	Chester Canal Act 1772
Amended by	Chester Canal Act 1778
Repealed by	Ellesmere and Chester Canals Unification Act 1813

Status: Repealed

Text of statute as originally enacted

Chester Canal Act 1778
- Act of Parliament
- Parliament of Great Britain
- Long title: An Act for the more effectually carrying into Execution the Powers contained in Two several Acts of Parliament, the One made in the Twelfth Year of His present Majesty's Reign, for making a Navigable Cut or Canal from the River Dee, within the Liberties of the City of Chester, to or near Middlewich and Nantwich, in the County of Chester; and the other made in the Seventeenth Year of His said Majesty's Reign, for varying and enlarging the Powers of the said former Act.
- Citation: 18 Geo. 3. c. 21
- Territorial extent: Great Britain

Dates
- Royal assent: 27 March 1778
- Commencement: 20 November 1777
- Repealed: 21 May 1813
Other legislation
Amends	Chester Canal Act 1772; Chester Canal Act 1778
Repealed by	Ellesmere and Chester Canals Unification Act 1813

Status: Repealed

Text of statute as originally enacted

Soon afterwards, Weston left the project, and Thomas Morris was recalled from Ireland to take over. He had previous experience building the extension of the Bridgewater Canal to Runcorn. Under his direction, the canal opened from Chester to Huxley Aqueduct on 16 January 1775, and to Beeston in June. Morris was sacked in September, to be replaced by Josiah Clowes. He too was sacked, and was followed by Moon, who had previously acted as assistant to Morris. The canal was completed under the direction of Joseph Taylor. In September 1776, the junction with the Dee was opened, but the project was now in financial difficulties. By late 1777, they had spent all of the share capital of £42,000 and another £19,000, which had been raised as a loan guaranteed by Samuel Egerton of Tatton. He was a shareholder in the company and related to the Duke of Bridgewater. They applied for another act of Parliament, the Chester Canal Act 1777 (17 Geo. 3. c. 67), which allowed them to raise another £25,000, by additional calls on existing shareholders, and to borrow £30,000 as a mortgage. They succeeded in raising £6,000 by making additional calls, and borrowed £4,000 from Richard Reynolds, an ironmaster from Ketley, who was responsible for several of the East Shropshire Canals, including the Wombridge Canal and the Ketley Canal.

The money was used to complete the line to Nantwich, and to build a reservoir at Bunbury Heath. The work was completed in August 1779, and the company hoped to raise enough money to then build the line to Middlewich. They proposed building it with narrow locks, to reduce the cost, but the shareholders were not prepared to support them; instead they concentrated on trying to generate traffic on the line that had been built. They attempted to mine salt at Nantwich, but failed to find any, and tried running boats on the Trent and Mersey, from which goods were carried over land to Nantwich, for onward carriage to Liverpool. They also ran boats for cargo and passengers on the canal itself. By the end of 1781, the company had no money and was unable to meet interest payments on the loans. They decided to forfeit the canal to Egerton, the main mortgagee, but he did not respond to their offer. Angry landowners who had not been paid drained Bunbury reservoir in March 1782, but somehow the committee managed to keep the canal open, by selling boats and land. Disaster struck in November 1787, when Beeston Staircase Locks collapsed, and there was no money to fund repairs.

=== The impact of the Ellesmere Canal ===
In 1790 the plans for the Ellesmere Canal were published, and the directors of the Chester Canal saw this as a chance to make the canal profitable again, and to build the Middlewich branch. Following the chairman's report to a meeting of the shareholders, they resolved to try to raise some money to carry out repairs, any by the end of the year reported that the canal was "nearly filled with water and business begins to stir." The Ellesmere scheme was extensive, with a line from the River Mersey at Netherpool (later renamed Ellesmere Port) to the River Dee near Chester, to give access to the Chester Canal, and branches to Shrewsbury, Ruabon, Llangollen, Bersham, Llanymynech and maybe Whitchurch and Wem. Although William Jessop estimated that the cost would be £196,898, it was the time of the Canal Mania, and 1,234 subscribers offered £967,700. Applications were scaled down and the company accepted £246,500. A rival group were proposing canals to the east, which resulted in the first group proposing a direct link with the Chester Canal from their Whitchurch Branch, and in February 1793, the two groups amalgamated. On 30 April they obtained an act of Parliament, the Ellesmere and Chester Canal Act 1793 (33 Geo. 3. c. 91) authorising them to raise £400,00 with an additional £100,000 if necessary. Jessop was assisted by John Duncombe, Thomas Denson and William Turner, and from 30 October, Thomas Telford was appointed to set out the line and oversee the construction.

Work began on the Wirral line from Ellesmere Port to Chester in November 1793, and packet boats began using most of it on 1 July 1795. The locks connecting it to the River Mersey were completed early the following year, and the connection to the Chester Canal opened in January 1797. The 8.75 miles (14.08 km) line was supplied with water from the Chester Canal, supplemented by a steam engine at Ellesmere Port which pumped water from the Mersey. Passenger boats along the canal proved very popular, with connections from Ellesmere Port to Liverpool provided by larger boats, although passenger services from Chester to Nantwich lasted for less than a year. Commercial traffic also grew steadily, helped by the construction of new basins at Chester and the provision of a tide lock into the Dee, which made access into the lower basin possible at all times, and helped to keep it free from silt.

The Ellesmere Canal Company had been constructing canals to the west, linking Llangollen to Frankton, but the route from there to Chester had not been decided. In 1796, they obtained an act of Parliament, the Ellesmere and Chester Canal Act 1796 (36 Geo. 3. c. 71), authorising a line from near the great aqueduct at Pontcysyllte running roughly northwards through Ruabon, Bersham, Gwersyllt and Pulford to join the River Dee opposite the canal basin at Chester. The Chester Canal Company, who were trying to put their financial affairs into order, noticed that the 1796 act failed to mention a connection with their canal. They decided to obtain an act of Parliament to enforce a connection, and to stop supplying water to the Wirral line. The Ellesmere company responded quickly, agreeing to make changes to their act of Parliament, and the Chester company continued to supply water. On the strength of this, they were also able to raise some money to put the canal into good order and to repay some of their debts. The Ellesmere company extended their canal eastwards from Frankton to Whitchurch, and in 1802, the two companies reached agreement on a line from near Whitchurch to Hurleston Junction, just to the north of Nantwich. It opened on 25 March 1805, and water supply was enhanced by the construction of a navigable feeder through Llangollen to Horseshoe Falls on the River Dee at Llantisilio.

Ellesmere and Chester Canals Unification Act 1813
- Act of Parliament
- Parliament of the United Kingdom
- Long title: An Act for uniting the Interests and Concerns of the Proprietors of the Chester Canal and Ellesmere Canal; and for amending the several Acts of His present Majesty, relating to the said Canals.
- Citation: 53 Geo. 3. c. lxxx
- Territorial extent: United Kingdom

Dates
- Royal assent: 21 May 1813
- Commencement: 21 May 1813 (Note: The Acts of Parliament (Commencement) Act 1793.)
- Repealed: 21 June 1827
Other legislation
Amends	Shrewsbury Canal Act 1793
Repeals/revokes	Chester Canal Act 1772; Chester Canal Act 1777; Chester Canal Act 1778; Ellesmere and Chester Canal Act 1796; Ellesmere and Chester Canal (No. 2) Act 1796
Repealed by	Ellesmere and Chester Canal Act 1827

Status: Repealed

Text of statute as originally enacted

In 1804, the Ellesmere company offered to buy out the Chester Canal for 1,000 of their shares, and to take over debts up to £4,000. The Chester Canal held out for more, and the negotiations failed. Three years later, the financial position of the Chester Canal was better, and they began paying off their debts. Finally in 1813, they agreed to amalgamate, and the action was authorised by a further act of Parliament, the Ellesmere and Chester Canals Unification Act 1813 (53 Geo. 3. c. lxxx). The Ellesmere company paid just half of their 1804 offer, and the 500 Ellesmere shares were distributed between the various Chester shareholders. The Ellesmere and Chester Canal Company took over on 1 July 1813. A new section of canal and an iron lock were built at Beeston in 1827, to resolve continual problems with leakage there.

=== A new route to the south ===
In 1826, the Birmingham and Liverpool Junction Canal was authorised by an act of Parliament, to construct a canal from Nantwich to a junction with the Staffordshire and Worcestershire Canal at Autherley in the Midlands. With the prospect of being part of a link between Liverpool and the Midlands, the joint company had again pressed for the construction of the Middlewich branch, which would give them an outlet to Manchester and the Potteries industrial centre around Stoke-on-Trent. The Trent and Mersey Canal refused to sanction the idea of a canal which would effectively reduce their income until the Birmingham and Liverpool Junction Canal was authorised. Once it was, the Ellesmere and Chester company obtained an act of Parliament in 1827, but the Trent and Mersey insisted that they build a short connecting canal, the Wardle Canal, consisting of a lock and not much more, the tolls for which were exorbitant. The 1827 act repealed all previous legislation for the Ellesmere and Chester Canals and consolidated their position. The branch was built as a narrow canal, and cost £129,000. It opened on 1 September 1833, but was little used until the Birmingham and Liverpool Junction Canal was completed. It finally opened on 2 March 1835, having suffered from engineering problems during construction. Again, it was a narrow canal, suitable for boats which were 7 feet (2.1 m) wide.

The two canal companies worked together from the start, in a bid to ensure that both remained profitable despite competition from the railways. This came soon, for the Grand Junction Railway from Warrington to Birmingham had been authorised before the canal opened, and was carrying goods by January 1838. Tolls on the canals were considerably lower than had been envisaged when the route was promoted. Experiments with steam tugs to haul trains of narrow boats were carried out in 1842, and a report in 1844 indicated that they were then used extensively. By the following year, however, the Ellesmere and Chester company were thinking about converting the canal to a railway, and argued that steam tugs were no cheaper than locomotive haulage on a railway. A merger with the Birmingham and Liverpool Junction Canal was discussed in 1844, and was authorised by the Ellesmere and Chester Canal Company Act 1845 (8 & 9 Vict. c. ii) on 8 May 1845, the new company retaining the name of the Ellesmere and Chester Canal.

=== Part of the Shropshire Union ===
Almost immediately, the company began looking at the possibility of converting all or part of the system into railways. W. A. Povis, their engineer, was convinced that railways could be built along the routes at around half the cost of building a new line. The move was opposed by the Staffordshire and Worcestershire Canal who argued that closing bits of the inland waterways system would have serious repercussions on the parts left. Robert Stephenson suggested that a number of railways and canals should amalgamate, to reduce competition when bills were presented to Parliament. The canals to join the Ellesmere and Chester Company were the eastern and western branches of the Montgomeryshire Canal, the Shrewsbury Canal and the Shropshire Canal. Although some would be converted to railways, the route from Ellesmere Port to Middlewich via Barbridge Junction was part of the system that would be retained as a waterway, on which salt was a major source of revenue. The plans resulted in the formation of the Shropshire Union Railways and Canal Company in 1846. The new company could raise £3.3 million of new capital, in addition to that already in existence, with another £1.1 million if necessary. They prompted new railways, but before any of the existing canals were converted, the company was leased to the London and North Western Railway, who took control in June 1847. They allowed the Shropshire Union to continue to operate fairly independently, and by 1849, the idea of conversion had been dropped, as the canals could still operate profitably.

Profitability was maintained, with the result then when most of the Shropshire Union network of canals were abandoned in 1944, the sections which had originally been the Chester Canal, the northern part of the Ellesmere Canal, the Birmingham and Liverpool Junction Canal and the Middlewich Branch were all retained. The only other section which was not abandoned was the Llangollen branch; this was kept because of its function as a water supply channel, rather than for navigation.

== Leisure era ==
In common with many operational canals, the remains of the Shropshire Union system, including what had been the Chester Canal, were nationalised on 1 January 1948, and became the responsibility of the Docks and Inland Waterways Executive, which was part of the British Transport Commission. At the time, the function of canals was still viewed as commercial. An official reply to the Inland Waterways Association in 1947 stated that the Ministry of Transport "... do not look very favourably upon any scheme for pleasure craft on the canals at the present time." Despite such official attitudes, Eric Wilson, who produced the first edition of Inland Waterways of Great Britain in 1939, noted that those wishing to use the Shropshire Union for leisure cruising should apply to the Agent at Chester. He advised that application should be made well in advance, in case there were problems due to the condition of the waterway and its locks.

Control of the canal passed to the British Waterways Board on 1 January 1963, and for the first time in over 100 years, it was managed by an organisation which was not under railway control. The Transport Act 1968 classified all waterways under the jurisdiction of British Waterways into commercial, cruising and remainder waterways. All of the remaining Shropshire Union network was designated as cruising waterway, with the potential for leisure use. By that time there was little commercial traffic. The branch to the River Dee at Chester had been unused since 1932–34, with the demise of steel traffic from Shotton steelworks to Ellesmere Port, and long distance carrying of tar from Ellesmere Port to the Midlands had ended in 1957–58.

The canal is popular with pleasure boaters, as much of it is pleasantly rural, with added interest provided by the city of Chester and Ellesmere Port with its waterways museum. The towpath through Chester provides an attractive route for walkers. The canal is well connected, with links to the Trent and Mersey Canal via the Middlewich Branch to the east, the Staffordshire and Worcestershire Canal via the former Birmingham and Liverpool Junction Canal to the south, and provides a route to the Llangollen Canal, from which the Montgomeryshire Canal, which is the subject of an ongoing restoration scheme, can be accessed. Boaters can also access the River Dee at Chester, although advance notice must be given, and the river is only accessible for four hours either side of high tide. At Ellesmere Port, the canal has connected to the Manchester Ship Canal since its opening in 1894. For many leisure cruisers, the requirements of the ship canal company for taking small boats onto a large commercial waterway are too daunting, and Ellesmere Port acts as the end of their journey.

The Chester Canal Heritage Trust was set up in 1997 to promote the canal and its heritage. Among other projects, they have received funding from the Local History Initiative and the Nationwide Building Society, which has allowed them to research the history of the canal and publish the results as a book. In 2012, responsibility for the canal passed from British Waterways to the newly formed Canal & River Trust.

== Traffic ==
Although the Chester Canal was not a success as traffic was sparse, this changed once it was connected to the Ellesmere Canal. The Ellesmere company expected to carry limestone from the quarries at Llanymynech and Trevor, iron from the ironworks at Ruabon and Bersham, and coal from mines at Chirk, Ruabon and Wrexham to Chester, Liverpool and Shrewsbury. The canal to Bersham and Wrexham was not built, and that to Shrewsbury was built much later on, but trade in coal, limestone, lime and building materials developed within the network of canals, and traffic between the canals and Liverpool increased steadily, much of it passing along the former Chester Canal. Receipts for the Ellesmere Canal were £12,568 in 1807 and £15,707 just two years later.

In 1836, a review of trade on the canals showed that limestone from Llanymynech and coal from Chirk was used to produce lime at a number of locations along the canals. Coal from Chirk for industrial and household use was carried, although there was a competing trade in coal from Flintshire, which travelled along the River Dee and entered the canal system at Chester. There was trade in iron from Ruabon to Chester, but the tolls were very low, as the canal route was 58 miles (93 km) long, whereas the land journey was only 20 miles (32 km). In 1838, the canals carried 60,406 tons of iron bound for Liverpool, most of it manufactured goods, of which 38,758 tons came from Staffordshire, 11,687 tons from North Wales and 9,961 tons from Shropshire. An additional 10,370 tons, most of which originated in North Wales, passed along the Middlewich Branch, bound for Manchester.

The canal company carried goods in their own boats, and produced a report on the four years from August 1846 to June 1850 in 1851. This showed an income of £180,746 from tolls, and identified six main types of traffic. These included iron goods from the Wolverhampton area to Liverpool; limestone from Trevor and Crickheath to Nantwich or Wappenshall on the Shrewsbury Canal, with a back trade in iron ore from near Burslem; general merchandise, which was carried between Chester and Liverpool; and general merchandise for Shropshire and North Wales. All of these were profitable. The carriage of general goods from Birmingham to Liverpool and the Chester coal trade both made a small loss.

Once the canals were owned by the London and North Western Railway, restrictions were imposed on what they could carry, and the canals failed to make sufficient money to cover the interest on mortgages. However, they made a substantial operating profit for some years. Around 1850, the average annual income was £104,638, which yielded a surplus of £45,885. Most of the income was from carrying, and by 1870, income had risen to £143,976, although this only yielded a surplus of £11,727. Total traffic was 855,462 tons in 1858, but this had dropped to 742,315 tons in 1868. The carrying business was expanded in the 1870s, but although turnover increased, operating profits fell dramatically, to just £1,568 in 1876. By 1905, total traffic was 469,950 tons, nearly all of it in boats owned by the company, and between the 1870s and the onset of World War I the company sometimes made a small operating profit and sometimes a loss. Following the end of the war, working hours were cut, wages increased, and the cost of materials increased. Losses escalated, to £153,318 on an income of £227,845 in 1920, and carriage by the company ceased in 1921, in an attempt to reduce losses. 433,230 tons of goods carried in 1929 had dropped to 151,144 tons in 1940, by which time income from tolls was £17,763, and total income was £40,985.

== Route ==
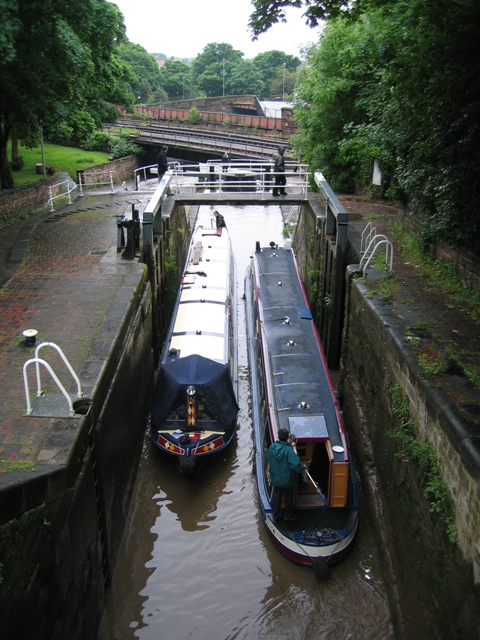
Boats passing on the Northgate Staircase. The boat on the left is ascending the flight, and is moving from the bottom to the middle chamber. The boat on the right is descending.

The River Dee branch heads eastwards from the river, and passes through two locks before turning to the north. Another two locks raise its level to that of the Ellesmere Canal, and the junction was the site of a historic boatyard. Originally, the branch continued eastwards after the first two locks, and another two brought it up to the level of the Chester Canal main line. From the junction, the Ellesmere main line headed south, to another right-angled band where it joined the Chester Canal. There are moorings at Tower Wharf, just before the bend. To the south of the canal is the old city, one of the few English cities which retains nearly all of its city walls, the cathedral much of which dates from 1092, and the King Charles' Tower, which overshadows the canal. After rising 33 feet (10 m) through the Northgate Staircase locks, which were cut out of solid rock, the canal enters a steep-sided rock cutting. After several bridges, the first of five locks which raise the level of the canal by another 43.3 feet (13.2 m) is reached. Between the fourth and fifth locks, the North Wales Coast railway line to Crewe crosses under the canal in a tunnel.

The canal passes along the south-western edge of Christleton, and through the centre of Waverton, where there is a large grade II listed mill building, which was once steam powered and includes bays in the right gable from which boats were loaded. The parish church is some distance from the main centre of population, on the edge of the flat Cheshire plain. The tall tower dates from the 16th century, and the roof of the nave is of hammer-beam construction, dating from 1635. There are several accommodation bridges on this section, all dating from the time of the construction of the canal, including Davies Bridge, Salmon's Bridge, and Faulkners Bridge, all built in orange brick and grade II listed structures. The railway line to Crewe follows the same general alignment as the canal, but a little further to the south, as both follow the valley of the River Gowy. The canal crosses from the south bank of the river to the north bank on an aqueduct and continues eastwards, passing the massive ruined remains of Beeston Castle, which was built in the 1220s by the Earl of Chester on top of a steep hill, and dominates the countryside.

The castle is opposite Wharton's Lock, which is followed by the village of Tiverton on the north bank. Immediately after a bridge carrying the A49 road over the canal is the first of the two Beeston locks. The first is called Beeston Iron Lock, and was built from cast iron plates in 1828 by Telford. Cast iron was used because of problems with running sand under the original stone locks. It is both a grade II* listed structure and a scheduled ancient monument, and is unique in England. Shortly afterwards is Beeston Stone Lock, also a listed structure, but dating from the construction of the canal and using conventional materials.

The next lock is Tilston Lock, situated about 1 mile (1.6 km) to the north of Bunbury. The railway crosses to the north side of the canal near Bunbury Staircase Locks, a staircase of two locks which share the intermediate gates. These are the last locks before the end of the Chester canal, and are the last locks which wide-beam boats can use when travelling south. As the canal approaches Barbridge Junction, the railway turns away, heading east, and the canal turns towards the south. The junction is the start of the Middlewich Branch, which descends through four locks to reach the Trent and Mersey Canal at Middlewich. After another 1.3 miles (2.1 km), the Llangollen Canal turns off at Hurleston Junction immediately rising through four locks. Soon, Nantwich Basin is reached, which was the historic terminus of the Chester Canal. Telford's original plan was to terminate the Birmingham and Liverpool Junction Canal by running it across Dorfold Park and joining the basin end-on, but the owner objected, and an embankment had to be built around the edge of the park. This crossed the road on Nantwich Aqueduct, and joined the canal just to the north of the basin. Dorfold Hall, to the west of the basin, is a grade I listed mansion, built in 1616 for Ralph Wilbraham.

=== Boat sizes ===
As built, the locks on the Chester Canal were originally 80 by 14.75 feet (24.38 by 4.50 m). Over the years the maximum size for vessels using the canal has altered. By 1985, it had been reduced to 72 by 13.25 feet (21.95 by 4.04 m), and in 2009, sizes were quoted as 72 by 9 feet (21.9 by 2.7 m).

== Points of interest ==
Point	Coordinates (Links to map resources)	OS Grid Ref	Notes
Junction with River Dee	53.1925°N 2.9025°W	SJ398665	
Junction of Dee Branch with main line	53.1947°N 2.9000°W	SJ399667	
Northgate Staircase locks	53.1939°N 2.8937°W	SJ403666	
Railway tunnel near Christleton Lock	53.1881°N 2.8492°W	SJ433660	
Aqueduct over River Gowy	53.1376°N 2.7351°W	SJ509603	
Wharton's Lock	53.1375°N 2.6917°W	SJ538602	
Beeston Iron Lock	53.1343°N 2.6682°W	SJ553598	
Tilstone Lock	53.1298°N 2.6481°W	SJ567593	
Bunbury Staircase Locks	53.1268°N 2.6322°W	SJ577590	
Barbridge Junction	53.1087°N 2.5797°W	SJ612569	with Middlewich Branch
Hurleston Junction	53.0938°N 2.5599°W	SJ626553	with Llangollen Canal
Nantwich Basin	53.0711°N 2.5390°W	SJ639527	Jn with B&LJ Canal

== See also ==
- Canals of Great Britain
- Chester Canal Heritage Trust

== Bibliography ==
- Cumberlidge, Jane (2009). Inland Waterways of Great Britain (8th ed.). Imray Laurie Norie and Wilson. ISBN 978-1-84623-010-3.
- Edwards, L A (1985). Inland Waterways of Great Britain (6th ed.). Imray Laurie Norie and Wilson. ISBN 978-0-85288-081-4.
- Emery, Gordon; et al. (2005). The Old Chester Canal. Gordon Emery for Chester Canal Heritage Trust. ISBN 978-1-872265-88-9.
- Hadfield, Charles (1985). The Canals of the West Midlands. David and Charles. ISBN 978-0-7153-8644-6.
- Nicholson (2006). Nicholson Guides Vol 4: Four Counties & the Welsh Canals. Harper Collins. ISBN 978-0-00-721112-8.
- Priestley, Joseph (1831). "Historical Account of the Navigable Rivers, Canals and Railways of Great Britain". Archived from the original on 13 March 2016.
- Squires, Roger (2008). Britain's restored canals. Landmark Publishing. ISBN 978-1-84306-331-5.
- Wilson, Edward (1975). The Ellesmere and Llangollen Canal. Chichester: Phillimore & Co. ISBN 978-0-85033-109-7.
- Wilson, W Eric (1939). Inland Waterways of Great Britain (1st ed.). Imray Laurie Norie and Wilson. [ISBN unspecified].
