= Wardle Canal =

Canal in Cheshire, England

Coordinates: 53°11′15″N 2°26′29″W

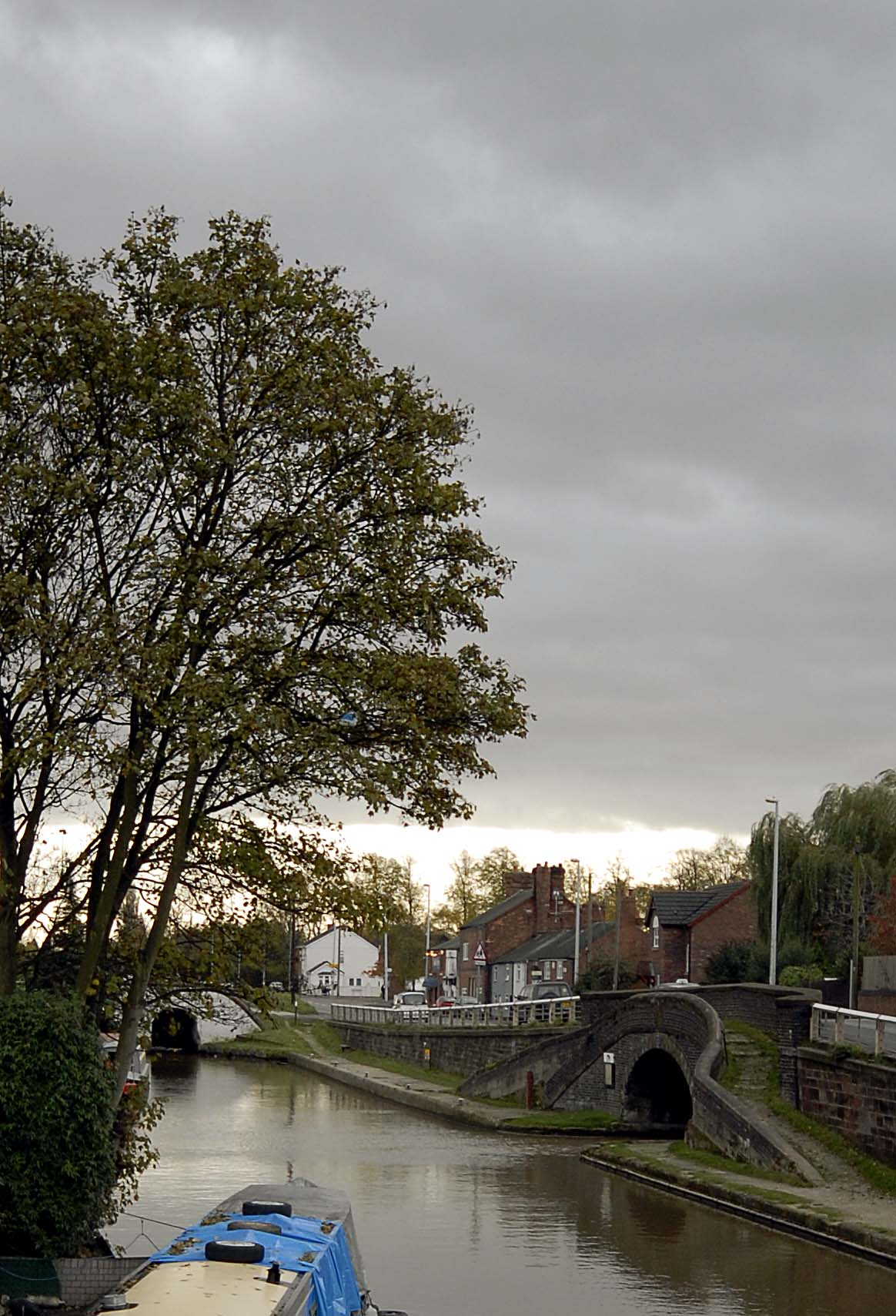
Junction between the Wardle Canal (right) and the Trent and Mersey Canal (2006)

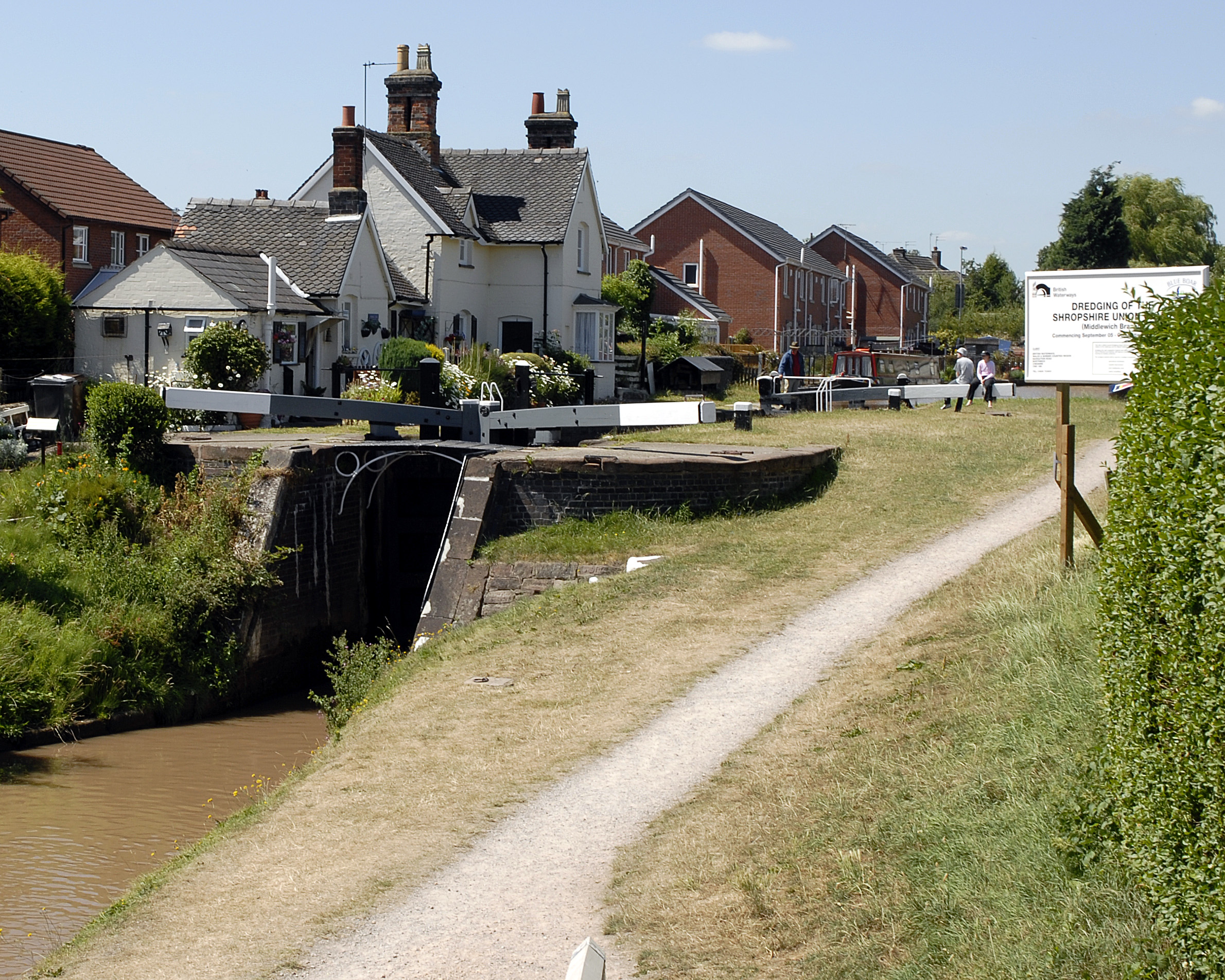
Wardle Lock on the Wardle Canal (2006)

The Wardle Canal is the shortest canal in the UK, at 154 feet (47 m). The canal, in Middlewich, Cheshire, connects the Trent and Mersey Canal to the Middlewich Branch of the Shropshire Union Canal, terminating with a single lock known as Wardle Lock. It was built in 1829 so that the navigation authority of the Trent and Mersey Canal could maintain control over the junction by charging tolls for boats wanting to travel between the junction and the Shropshire Union Canal.

== Maureen Shaw ==
Maureen Shaw, a boatwoman who was well known to passing boaters as well as the local and canal community, lived in the Lock Cottage at Wardle Lock for many years, with the result that it was often referred to as "Maureen’s Lock". Following her death in 2012, a memorial panel was placed at the lock in her honour. The cottage is now a private family residence.

== See also ==
- Canals of Great Britain
- History of the British canal system
- Four Counties Ring – a canal cruising ring that includes the Wardle Canal
