= Nicholson Guides =

Guides to waterways of Great Britain

The Nicholson Guides are a set of books originally published by Robert Nicholson Publications, then jointly by Bartholomew and the Ordnance Survey, and now by HarperCollins, as guides to the navigable and un-navigable waterways of England and Wales (and, more recently, Scotland).

== History ==
The large-scale Guides were mainly intended for people traveling by boat along the river or canal, but now include a number of non-navigable waterways. Generally, each page includes a map of a section of the waterway with features such as bridges, locks, boatyards and services. Each section of the map includes references to nearby pubs, towns and villages, roads and railways.

Robert Nicholson had published a series of guides to London in the 1960s, before realising that there was nothing about the River Thames, so in 1969 he published Nicholson's Guide to the Thames. With the rise of leisure boating in the early 1970s, British Waterways commissioned Nicholson to write a series of guides to their waterways, in a similar style to the Thames book. In order to research them, a boat was chartered, Paul Atterbury and Andrew Darwin were asked to write the material, and a student was hired to drive the boat. The guides documented eating places near to the canals, points of interest that could be easily visited, and every facility for boaters that they found, from water points to winding holes. Between them, they developed a style which lasted until the 1990s. The first edition sold for 75 pence, but by the early 1980s the price had increased to £1.50.

The format was a tall thin book which had the canal running top to bottom of each page, with the location north being adjusted to suit this format. Often pages had the canal 'straightened' mid page, with the location of north changing at the split point.

The first edition came out as four Guides:

1 South East
2 North West
3 South West
4 North East

A fifth Guide, The Midlands, came out in the early 1980s. The first series of guides were produced as pocket-sized hardback books.

In 1981 the 'second revised edition' came in only three chapters; 3 North, 2 Midlands, 1 South and dropped the British Waterway Board affiliation. This edition was printed in two colours, black and blue, with the line of the canal being picked out in blue on an otherwise black and white map.

In 1985 the 'second edition', now titled 'The Ordnance Survey Guide to the Waterway' published by Nicholsons had four guides: 3 North, 2 Central, 1 South. Thames (and Wey). By this time, the format had changed to spiral-bound paperback books, and a fifth guide, covering the Fens and the Broads in a single book was added in the late 1980s.

The fifth edition in 1991 included 5 books:

1 South
2 Central
3 North
River Thames
Broads & Fens

7th Edition 1995, by this time Nicholsons had been an 'Imprint' of HarperCollins and was back down to four books, with a fifth publication being the first foldout small-scale map covering Great Britain.

1 South
2 Central
3 North
River Thames
Guide to Great Britain

A major change occurred in the mid-1990s, when Ordnance Survey announced that the two-tone maps should be replaced by full-colour maps. Nicholson's had been taken over by Bartholomews, and they had subsequently been taken over by HarperCollins. Throughout, David Perrott, who had been an apprentice of Robert Nicholson in 1969 when the first Thames book was produced, had remained as editor. Collins wrestled with the Ordnance Survey ultimatum for some 14 months, before deciding to proceed with full colour mapping, and seven regional guides were produced, in a format which was still current in 2019. They also produced a fold-out waterways map, and later guides to the Broads and the Scottish Canals. Surprisingly, research had been conducted by offering the researchers money to pay for bed and breakfast, and a contribution towards fuel for a boat until this time, but with the new editions, remuneration of the researchers was finally covered by a commercial agreement.

The 1997/2000/2003/2007 editions were extended to 8 books:

1 Grand Union, Oxford & the South East
2 Severn, Avon & Birmingham
3 Birmingham & the Heart of England
4 Four Counties & the Welsh Canals
5 North West & the Pennines
6 Nottingham, York & the North East
7 River Thames & the Southern Waterways
8 Scotland, the Highland and Lowland Waterways (only in the 2003 edition)

There are also two small-scale fold-out maps, one covering Great Britain in its entirety, and one of Scottish waterways.

From 1997 the maps became A5 format, and maps were in full colour, with the canal overlaid onto the current OS map of the time, north was fixed as being at the top of each page.

Jonathan Mosse became part of the research team in 1989, and his first major contribution was to cycle the towpath of the Kennet and Avon Canal, then reaching the end of a lengthy restoration. His work was added to the Southern guide. The policy had been to update all of the guides every three years, but this has been revised so that two or three guides are updated each year. The guides have also been reworked to reach a wider audience, by the inclusion of any waterway that can be followed from one end to the other, on foot or by bicycle. Thus the Northern Reaches of the Lancaster Canal were added to the 2019 reprint of the North West and the Pennines guide.

== See also ==
- Canals of the United Kingdom
- Waterways in the United Kingdom

== Bibliography ==
- Mosse, Jonathan (February 2019a). "Reaching North". Waterways World. ISSN 0309-1422.
- Mosse, Jonathan (July 2019b). "Fifty years of Nicholson's". Waterways World. ISSN 0309-1422.
- Nicholson (2019). Nicholson Guides Vol 5: North West & the Pennines. Harper Collins. ISBN 978-0-00-830939-8.
