= Birmingham Canal Navigations =

Network of the English canal system

Coordinates: 52.4776°N 1.9088°W

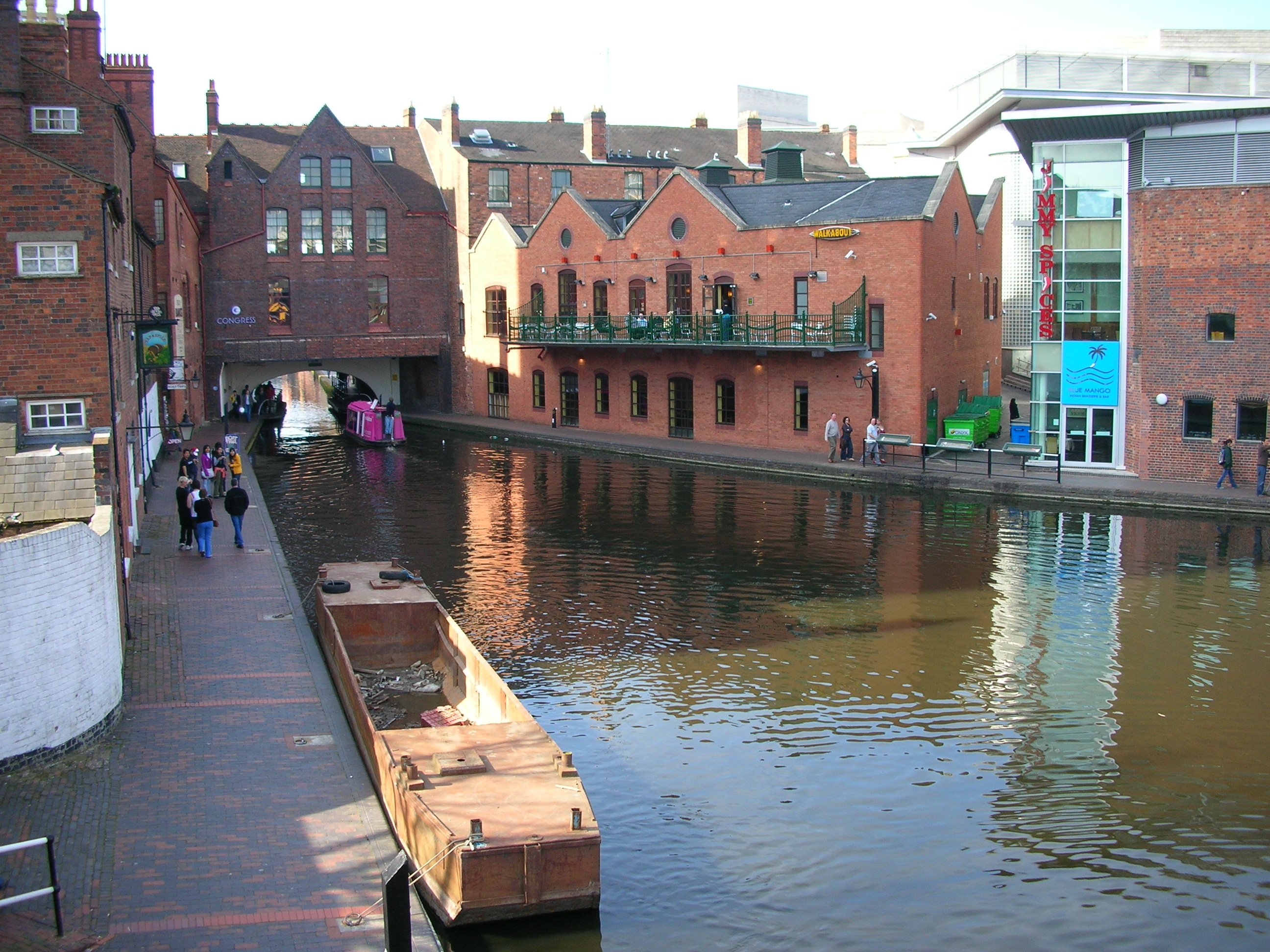
The start of the Birmingham Canal at Gas Street Basin, central Birmingham

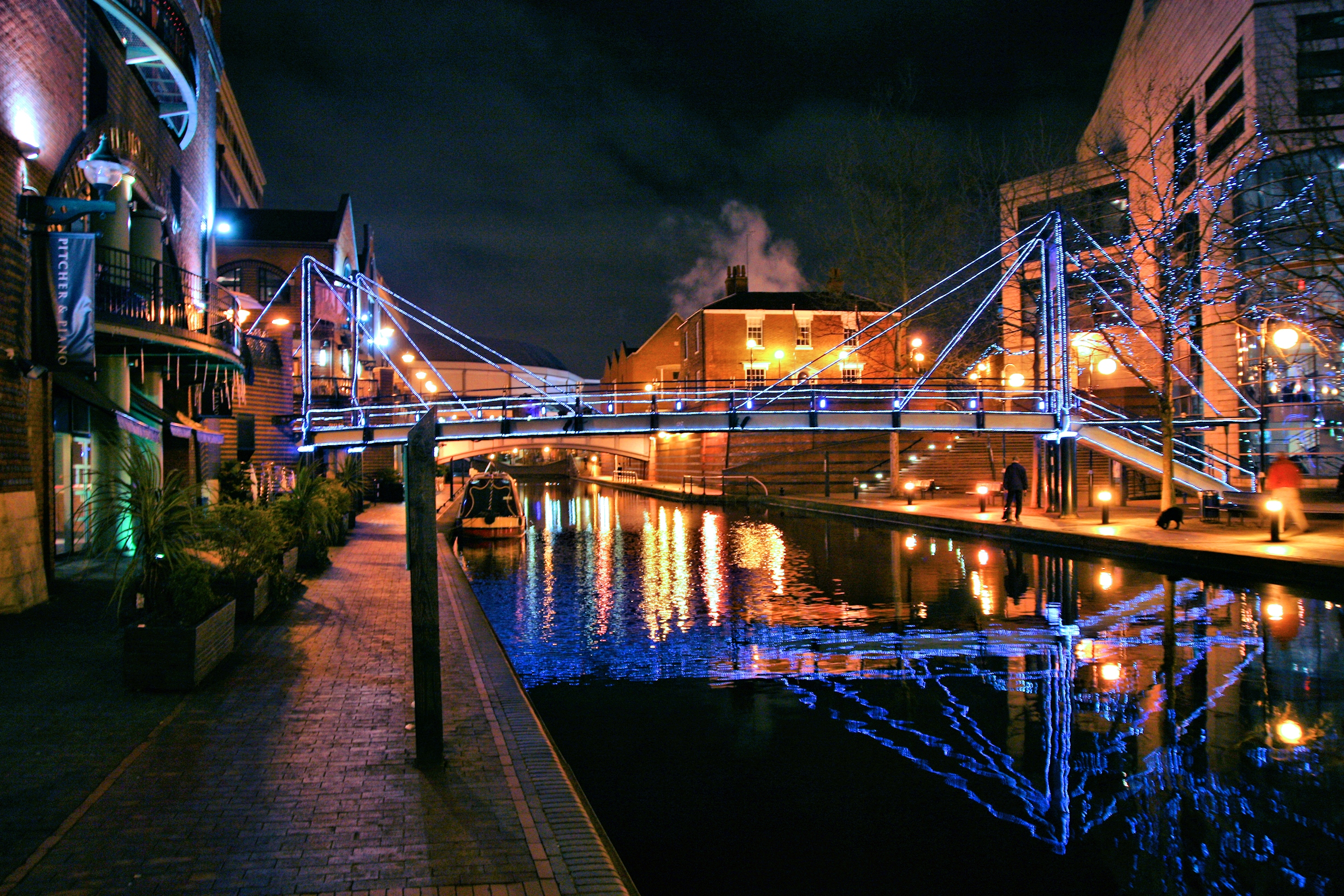
Bridge over Birmingham Canal Old Main Line in Birmingham City Centre

Birmingham Canal Navigations (BCN) is a network of canals connecting Birmingham, Wolverhampton, and the eastern part of the Black Country. The BCN is connected to the rest of the English canal system at several junctions. It was owned and operated by the Birmingham Canal Navigation Company from 1767 to 1948.

At its working peak, the BCN contained about 160 miles (257 km) of canals; today just over 100 miles (160 km) are navigable, and the majority of traffic is from tourist and residential narrowboats.

== History ==
BCN Network (within shaded area) from historical map, 1864

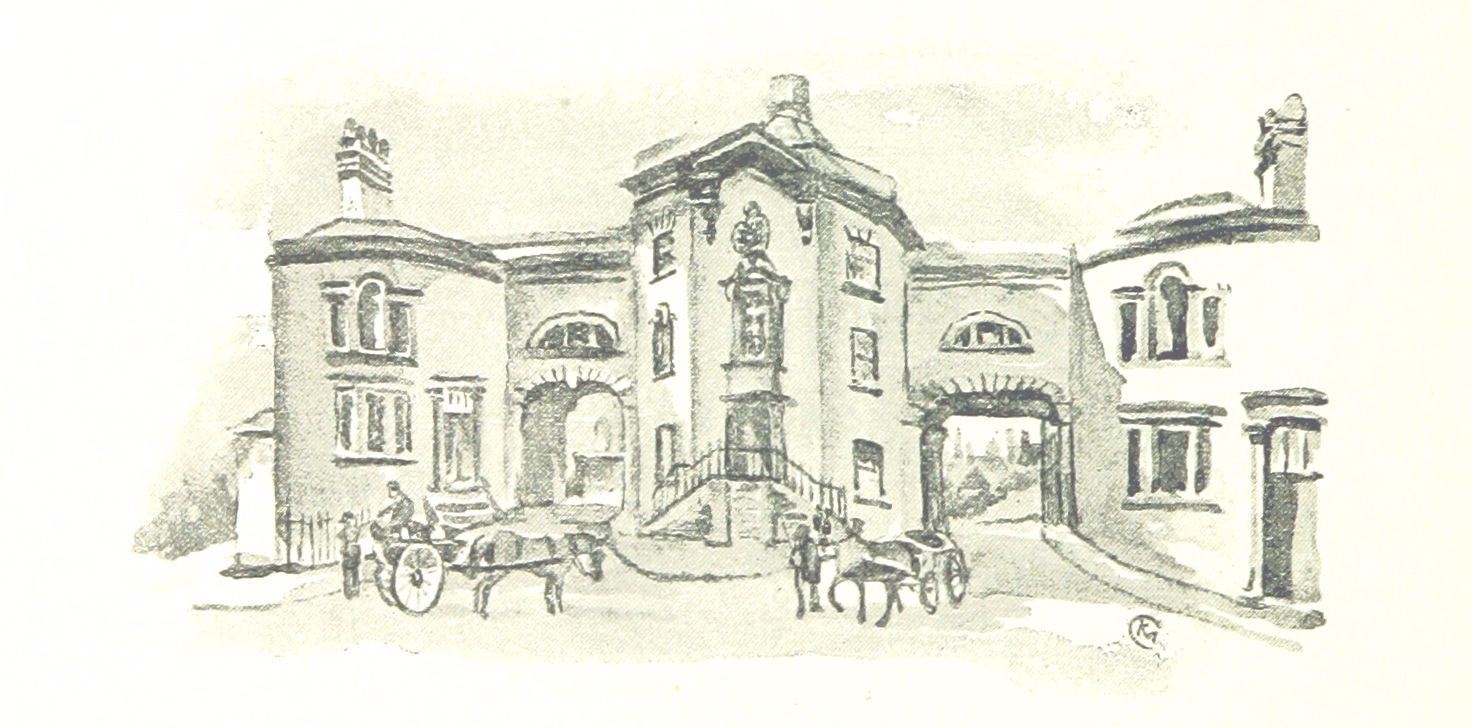
Birmingham Canal Company offices fronting Paradise Street. They backed onto the Old Wharf terminus.

Birmingham Canal Navigation Act 1768
- Act of Parliament
- Parliament of Great Britain
- Long title: An Act for making and maintaining a Navigable Cut or Canal from Birmingham to Bilstone, and from thence to Autherley, there to communicate with the Canal now making between the Rivers Severn and Trent, and for making collateral Cuts up to several Coal Mines.
- Citation: 8 Geo. 3. c. 38
- Territorial extent: Great Britain

Dates
- Royal assent: 24 February 1768
- Commencement: 24 November 1767 (Note: Start of session.)
- Repealed: 17 June 1835
Other legislation
Amended by	Birmingham Canal Navigation Act 1769
Repealed by	Birmingham Canal Navigations Act 1835
Relates to	Birmingham and Fazeley Canal Act 1783; Birmingham and Fazeley Canal Act 1784

Status: Repealed

Text of statute as originally enacted

Birmingham Canal Navigation Act 1769
- Act of Parliament
- Parliament of Great Britain
- Long title: An Act to rectify a Mistake in an Act, passed in the Eighth Year of His present Majesty, intituled, "An Act for making and maintaining a navigable Cut or Canal from Birmingham to Bilstone, and from thence to Autherley, there to communicate with the Canal now making between the Rivers Severn and Trent; and for making collateral Cuts up to several Coal Mines;" and to explain and amend the said Act.
- Citation: 9 Geo. 3. c. 53
- Territorial extent: Great Britain

Dates
- Royal assent: 21 March 1769
- Commencement: 8 November 1768
- Repealed: 17 June 1835
Other legislation
Amends	Birmingham Canal Navigation Act 1768
Repealed by	Birmingham Canal Navigations Act 1835

Status: Repealed

Text of statute as originally enacted

Birmingham Canal Navigation Act 1771
- Act of Parliament
- Parliament of Great Britain
- Long title: An Act to oblige the Company of Proprietors of the Birmingham Canal Navigation, to complete the said Canal to a Field called Newhall Ring, adjoining to the Town of Birmingham in the County of Warwick, within a limited Time, and to maintain and keep the same free and open for the Passage of Boats, Barges, and other Vessels.
- Citation: 11 Geo. 3. c. 67
- Territorial extent: Great Britain

Dates
- Royal assent: 8 March 1771
- Commencement: 13 November 1770
- Repealed: 17 June 1835
Other legislation
Repealed by	Birmingham Canal Navigations Act 1835

Status: Repealed

Text of statute as originally enacted

The earliest mention of the Birmingham Canal Navigation appears in Aris's Birmingham Gazette on 11 April 1768. Here it was reported that on 25 March 1768, the first general assembly of the Company of Proprietors of the Birmingham Canal Navigation was held at the Swann Inn, Birmingham, to raise funds to submit for an act of Parliament. The first canal to be built in the area was the Birmingham Canal, authorised by the Birmingham Canal Navigation Act 1768 (8 Geo. 3. c. 38) and built from 1768 to 1772 under the supervision of James Brindley from the, then, edge of Birmingham, with termini at Newhall Wharf (since built over) and Paradise Wharf (also known as Old Wharf) near to Gas Street Basin to meet the Staffordshire and Worcestershire Canal at Aldersley (north of Wolverhampton). It opened for business on 14 September 1772.

The Birmingham Canal Navigation Act 1769 (9 Geo. 3. c. 53) was obtained to construct the canal through a detached portion of the county of Shropshire, near Oldbury, and it included powers to make reservoirs anywhere within 3 miles between Smethwick and Oldbury.

Birmingham Canal Navigation Act 1794
- Act of Parliament
- Parliament of Great Britain
- Long title: An Act for extending and improving the Birmingham Canal Navigations.
- Citation: 34 Geo. 3. c. 87
- Territorial extent: Great Britain

Dates
- Royal assent: 17 April 1794
- Commencement: 17 April 1794 (Note: The Acts of Parliament (Commencement) Act 1793.)
- Repealed: 17 June 1835
Other legislation
Amended by	Birmingham Canal Navigations Act 1818
Repealed by	Birmingham Canal Navigations Act 1835

Status: Repealed

Text of statute as originally enacted

The Birmingham and Fazeley Canal, from Birmingham to Tamworth, followed in 1784 with the Birmingham Canal Company merging with the Birmingham and Fazeley Canal Company immediately, to form what was originally called the Birmingham and Birmingham and Fazeley Canal Company. This cumbersome name was short-lived, and the combined company became incorporated as the Birmingham Canal Navigations Company from 1794, as the network was expanded. The Birmingham Canal Navigation Act 1794 (34 Geo. 3. c. 87) authorised the extension from Broadwater to Walsall, and the short cut between Bloomfield and Deepfield, where the Coseley Tunnel was constructed, which with a length of 1.75 miles (2.82 km), avoided a detour around Tipton Hill of 4 miles (6.4 km).

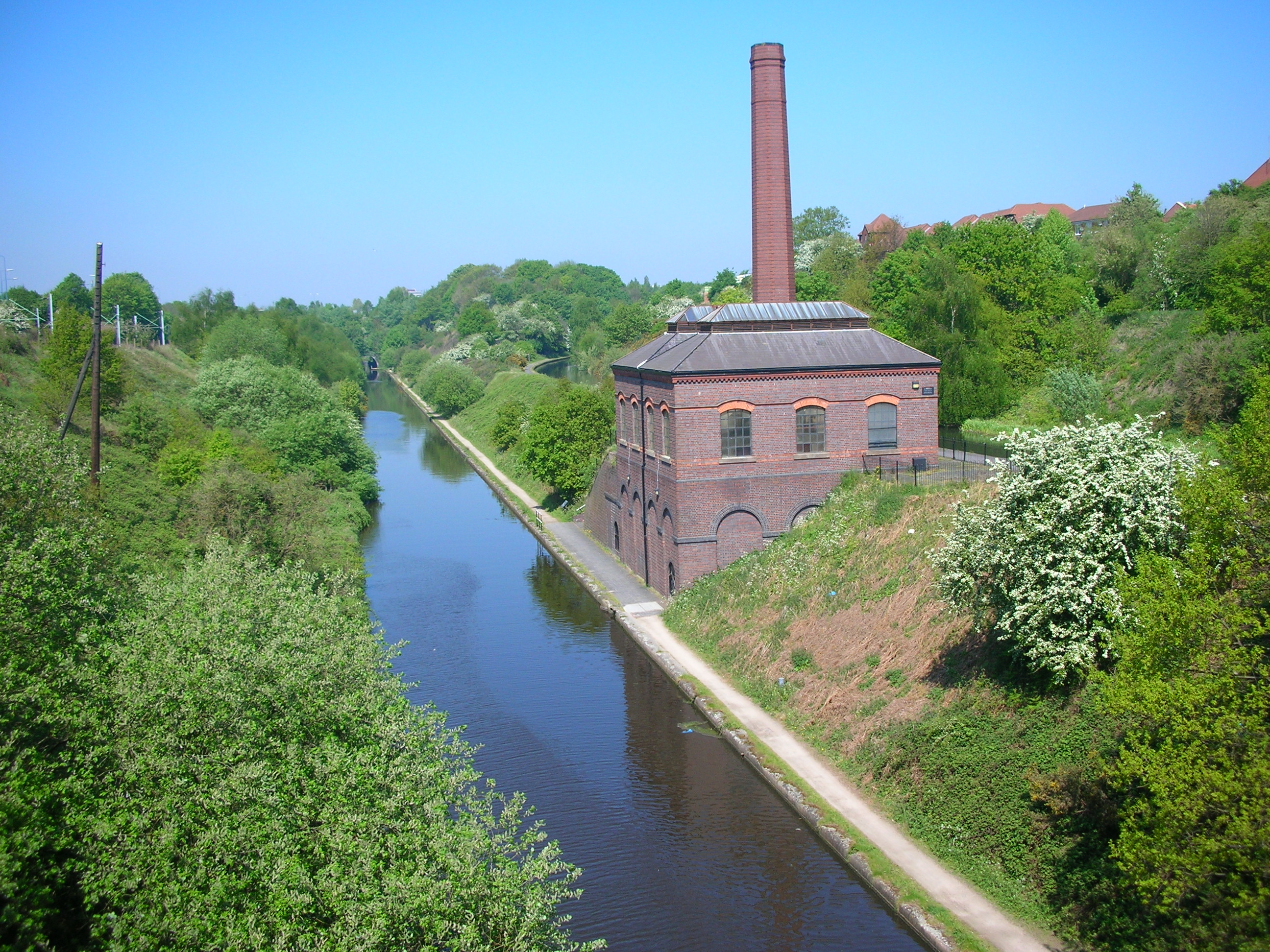
New Smethwick Pumping Station

Between 1825 and 1829 the canal was improved by the cutting down by 16 feet (4.9 m) of the summit at Smethwick, which occupied two and a half years, and cost £560,000 (equivalent to £53,160,000 in 2025), and by cutting off bends and erecting steam engines which reduced the cost of haulage by 4d. per ton.

Between 1825 and 1837 the navigation was improved between Spon Lane, Deepfield and Wolverhampton, saving a distance of six miles, which reduced the toll on coal by 9d per ton. At the same time the Titford Canal was constructed at a cost upwards of £200,000 (equivalent to £19,360,000 in 2025).

Birmingham Canal Navigations and Worcester and Birmingham Canal Navigable Communication Act 1815
- Act of Parliament
- Parliament of the United Kingdom
- Long title: An Act for establishing a Navigable Communication between the Birmingham Canal Navigations and the Worcester and Birmingham Canal, and amending certain Acts passed relative thereto.
- Citation: 55 Geo. 3. c. xl
- Territorial extent: United Kingdom

Dates
- Royal assent: 12 May 1815
- Commencement: 12 May 1815
- Repealed: 17 June 1835
Other legislation
Repealed by	Birmingham Canal Navigations Act 1835

Status: Repealed

Text of statute as originally enacted

Birmingham Canal Navigations Act 1835
- Act of Parliament
- Parliament of the United Kingdom
- Long title: An Act to consolidate and extend the Powers and Provisions of the several Acts relating to the Birmingham Canal Navigations.
- Citation: 5 & 6 Will. 4. c. xxxiv
- Territorial extent: United Kingdom

Dates
- Royal assent: 17 June 1835
- Commencement: 17 June 1835
Other legislation
Repeals/revokes	Birmingham Canal Navigation Act 1768; Birmingham Canal Navigation Act 1769; Birmingham Canal Navigation Act 1771; Birmingham and Fazeley Canal Act 1783; Birmingham and Fazeley Canal Act 1784; Birmingham Canal Navigation Act 1794; Birmingham Canal Navigations and Worcester and Birmingham Canal Navigable Communication Act 1815; Birmingham Canal Navigations Act 1818
Amended by	Birmingham Canal Navigations Act 1839; Wyrley and Essington Canal Navigation Act 1840; Birmingham and Warwick Junction Canal Navigation Act 1840; Birmingham Canal Navigations Act 1844; Birmingham and Dudley Canal Consolidation Act 1846; London and Birmingham Railway and Birmingham Canal Arrangement Act 1846; Birmingham and Dudley Canal Consolidation Act 1846
Relates to	Shrewsbury and Birmingham Railway Act 1846; Shrewsbury, Wolverhampton and South Staffordshire Junction Railway Act 1846; Birmingham, Wolverhampton and Dudley Railway Act 1846; Trent Valley, Midlands and Grand Junction Railway Act 1846; Shropshire Union Railways and Canal (Chester and Wolverhampton Line) Act 1846; Birmingham, Wolverhampton and Stour Valley Railway (Birmingham, Wolverhampton and Dudley Lines) Act 1846; British Transport Commission Act 1953; British Transport Commission Act 1954; British Transport Commission Act 1960; British Transport Commission Act 1962

Status: Amended

The junction with the Warwick and Birmingham Canal was made under powers of the Birmingham Canal Navigations and Worcester and Birmingham Canal Navigable Communication Act 1815 (55 Geo. 3. c. xl). These improvements were all consolidated under the Birmingham Canal Navigations Act 1835 (5 & 6 Will. 4. c. xxxiv).

From 1839 to 1843 the Tame Valley Canal was built, along with the Bentley, Rushall and Walsall Junction Canals opening up the Cannock Chase and Wyrley coal districts to the town of Birmingham at a cost upwards of £570,000 (equivalent to £62,620,000 in 2025).

Birmingham Canal Navigations Act 1840
- Act of Parliament
- Parliament of the United Kingdom
- Long title: An Act to authorize the Company of Proprietors of the Birmingham Canal Navigations to extend and alter the Line of their intended Cut or Canal from Dank's Branch to Salford Bridge; and to grant further Powers to the said Company.
- Citation: 3 & 4 Vict. c. lvi
- Territorial extent: United Kingdom

Dates
- Royal assent: 4 June 1840
- Commencement: 4 June 1840

Status: Current legislation

Text of statute as originally enacted

The Wyrley and Essington Canal was incorporated by the Birmingham Canal Navigation Act 1792 which authorized the line from Wolverhampton to Sneyd Junction and Walsall. The extension to Huddlesford and the Lord Hay and Daw End branches were constructed under the Birmingham Canal Navigation Act 1794 (34 Geo. 3. c. 87). This amalgamated with the Birmingham Canal Navigations in 1840.

In 1855, the Cannock Extension Canal and the Wyrley Bank Branch were added to the network at a cost upwards of £100,000 (equivalent to £9,310,000 in 2025).

From 1855 to 1858 the Netherton Tunnel and other improvements cost the company upwards of £350,000 (equivalent to £37,600,000 in 2025).

London and Birmingham Railway and Birmingham Canal Arrangement Act 1846
- Act of Parliament
- Parliament of the United Kingdom
- Long title: An Act for carrying into effect certain Arrangements between the London and Birmingham Railway Company and the Company of Proprietors of the Birmingham Canal Navigations, and for granting certain Powers to the said respective Companies.
- Citation: 9 & 10 Vict. c. ccxliv
- Territorial extent: United Kingdom

Dates
- Royal assent: 27 July 1846
- Commencement: 27 July 1846
Other legislation
Amends	Birmingham Canal Navigations Act 1835; Wyrley and Essington Canal Navigation Act 1840

Status: Current legislation

In 1776, the Dudley Canal was authorised from Parkhead to the junction with the Stourbridge Canal. The Parkhead to Tipton Green section including Dudley Tunnel was made under the Dudley Canal Act 1785 (25 Geo. 3. c. 87), and the extension from Parkhead to Selly Oak Junction with the Oxford and Birmingham Canal, including the Gorsty Hill and Lappal Tunnels under the Selly Oak Canal Act 1793 (33 Geo. 3. c. 121). This canal became part of the Birmingham Canal Navigations in 1846 under the London and Birmingham Railway and Birmingham Canal Arrangement Act 1846 (9 & 10 Vict. c. ccxliv).

It was re-established as a body corporate on 17 June 1835. It was taken over by the London and Birmingham Railway in 1846, and subsequently owned by the London and North Western Railway, then the London, Midland and Scottish Railway until 1 January 1948 when was it passed to the British Transport Commission.

== Levels ==
The BCN is built on three main levels, each with its own reservoir.

- 453 feet (138 m) OD, the Birmingham Level;
- 473 feet (144 m) OD, the Wolverhampton Level;
- 408 feet (124 m) OD, the Walsall Level

These levels are linked by locks at various places on the network.

There are also stretches on their own levels.

- The Titford Canal and its branches were built at 511 feet (156 m) OD, linked to the Titford Reservoir (Titford Pool). A feeder supplies water to the Edgbaston Reservoir.
- A short section of the BCN Old Main Line, at Smethwick Summit, was built at 491 feet (150 m) OD. Pumps at either end were built to pump water used by the locks back to the summit – one at Spon Lane locks, and one at Smethwick locks: the Smethwick Engine. When the summit became too busy John Smeaton designed a scheme where it was lowered by 18 feet (5.5 m) to the Wolverhampton Level, eliminating six locks and providing a parallel set of locks at Smethwick which improved traffic throughput. It also linked to the general Wolverhampton Level supply of water.

== The canals of the BCN ==
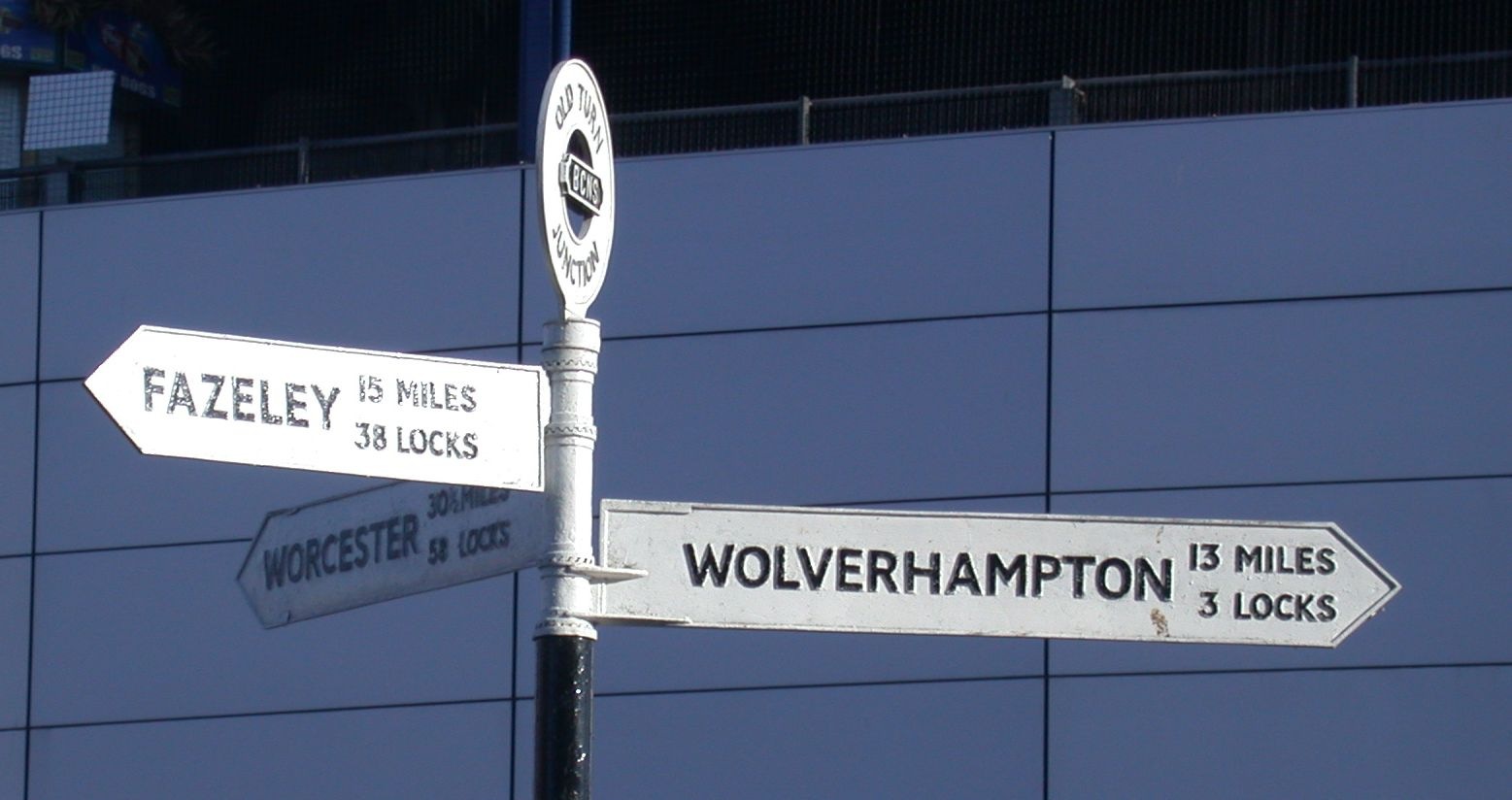
Fingerpost at Old Turn Junction, where the BCN Main Line meets the Birmingham and Fazeley Canal

- BCN Main Line (originally known as the Birmingham Canal) from Aldersley Junction (north of Wolverhampton) to Gas Street Basin (at the Worcester Bar in central Birmingham), using some of the Old Main Line canal.
  - Old Main Line, originally terminating in Birmingham at two wharfs now built upon: Old Wharf (adjacent to Gas Street Basin) and Newhall Wharf.
  - New Main Line, a revised route for the Birmingham Canal, double towpathed, largely progressing in straight lines using cuttings and tunnels.
- Bentley Canal (abandoned)
- Birmingham and Fazeley Canal (from Old Turn Junction (by the National Indoor Arena), eastwards to the Coventry Canal at Fazeley Junction, and thence north-west as far as bridge 78.)
  - Digbeth Branch Canal
- Bradley Locks Branch
- Dudley Canal
  - Bumble Hole Branch Canal (part of a bypassed loop)
  - Dudley Canal Line No 1 (see also Dudley Tunnel)
  - Dudley Canal Line No 2 (about half dewatered; see also Lapal Tunnel; Netherton Reservoir)
  - The Two Locks Line (infilled)
- The Engine Arm
- Gower Branch Canal - linking the Birmingham and Wolverhampton levels, via three locks, at Tividale.
- Icknield Port Loop (part of the Old Main Line cut off by Telford's improvements, now serving as a feeder from Edgbaston Reservoir)
- Netherton Tunnel Branch Canal
- Rushall Canal
- Soho Loop (an old circuitous route cut off by Telford's improvements, originally with a branch, the Soho Branch to Soho Wharf, serving the Soho Manufactory)
- Spon Lane Locks Branch (between Bromford Junction and Spon Lane Junction on the Old Main Line - 3 locks, part of the original Wednesbury Canal, not to be confused with Spon Lane Branch, another name for Tat Bank Branch on the Titford Canal)
- Titford Canal
- Tame Valley Canal (a later canal cutting off some northern meanders)
- Walsall Canal (a more modern canal connecting the main line with Walsall and forming a big northern loop with the Wyrley and Essington Canal)
  - Anson Branch
  - Walsall Branch Canal (Town Branch)
- Wednesbury Oak Loop (part of the original Old Main Line, now incomplete)
- Wednesbury Old Canal - part of the original Wednesbury Canal
  - Ridgacre Branch
- Wyrley and Essington Canal (bought by the Birmingham Canal Navigations in 1840)
  - Anglesey Branch
  - Birchills Branch
  - Cannock Extension Canal
  - Daw End Branch Canal
  - Lord Hay's Branch (Lords Hayes Branch) (abandoned)

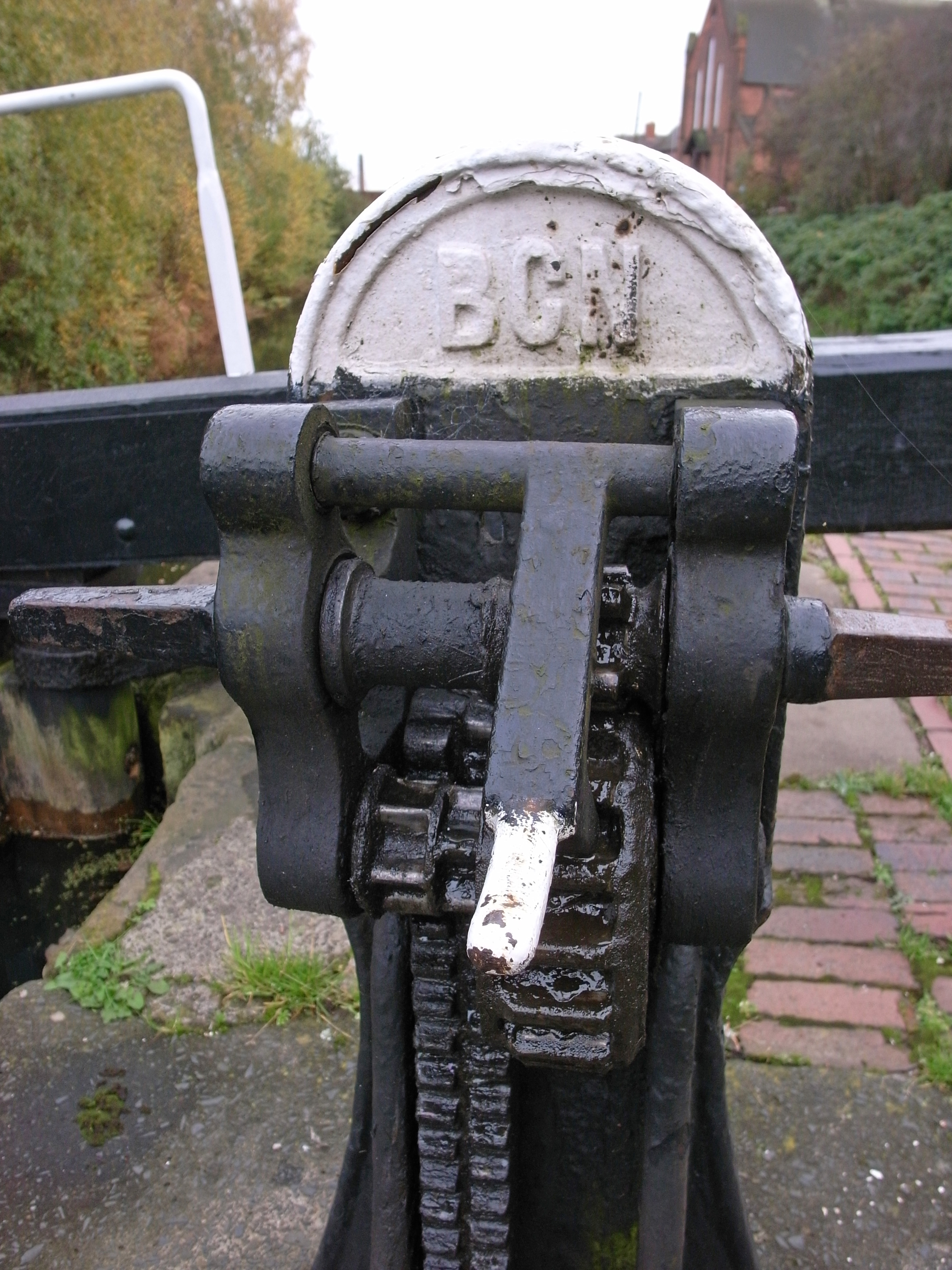
BCN branded paddle gear on the Walsall Canal

== Linking canals ==
- Coventry Canal (at Fazeley Junction)
- Grand Union Canal (connects at Salford Junction and also Bordesley Junction (originally Warwick Bar)
- Staffordshire and Worcestershire Canal (at Aldersley Junction)
- Stourbridge Canal
- Worcester and Birmingham Canal (connects the BCN Main Line at the Worcester Bar, (alongside Gas Street Basin), southwards, to the River Severn at Worcester)

== Associated features ==
- Chasewater (feeds Wyrley and Essington Canal)
- Edgbaston Reservoir, originally called Rotton Park Reservoir, itself fed from Titford Reservoir (feeds Birmingham Old and New Line)

== Engineers ==
- James Brindley
- Thomas Dadford
- John Smeaton
- Thomas Telford
- James Walker

== Society ==
The BCN Society is a registered charity (number 1091760) formed in 1968, which exists to conserve, improve and encourage a wide range of interests in the BCN. It publishes a quarterly journal. Boundary Post. From 1983, it erected signposts at most of the canal junctions on the BCN.

== See also ==
- The Smethwick Engine
- Transport in Birmingham
- Stourport Ring

== Bibliography ==
- Broadbridge, S. R. (1974). The Birmingham Canal Navigations, Vol. 1 1768 - 1846. David & Charles. ISBN 0-7509-2077-7. (There was no second volume)
- Foster, Richard (1990). Birmingham New Street. The Story of a Great Station Including Curzon Street. 1 Background and Beginnings. The Years up to 1860. [Wild Swan Publications]. ISBN 0-906867-78-9.
- Hadfield, Charles (1969). The Canals of the West Midlands (Second ed.). David & Charles. ISBN 0-7153-4660-1.
- Pearson, Michael (1989). Canal Companion - Birmingham Canal Navigations. J. M. Pearson & Associates. ISBN 0-907864-49-X. - canal maps and text
- Perrott, David; Mosse, Jonathan (2006). Nicholson Waterways Guide 3 - Birmingham & the Heart of England. Collins. ISBN 978-0-00-721111-1.
- Shill, Ray (2000). Birmingham's Canals. Sutton Publishing.
- Birmingham Canal Navigations. GEOprojects. 2004. ISBN 0-86351-172-4. - Highly detailed printed 1:30,000 sheet map
