= Spon Lane Branch =

Spon Lane Branch may refer to one of two canals in West Midlands of England:

- Spon Lane Locks Branch
- Tat Bank Branch, part of the Titford Canal
