= Spon Lane Locks Branch =

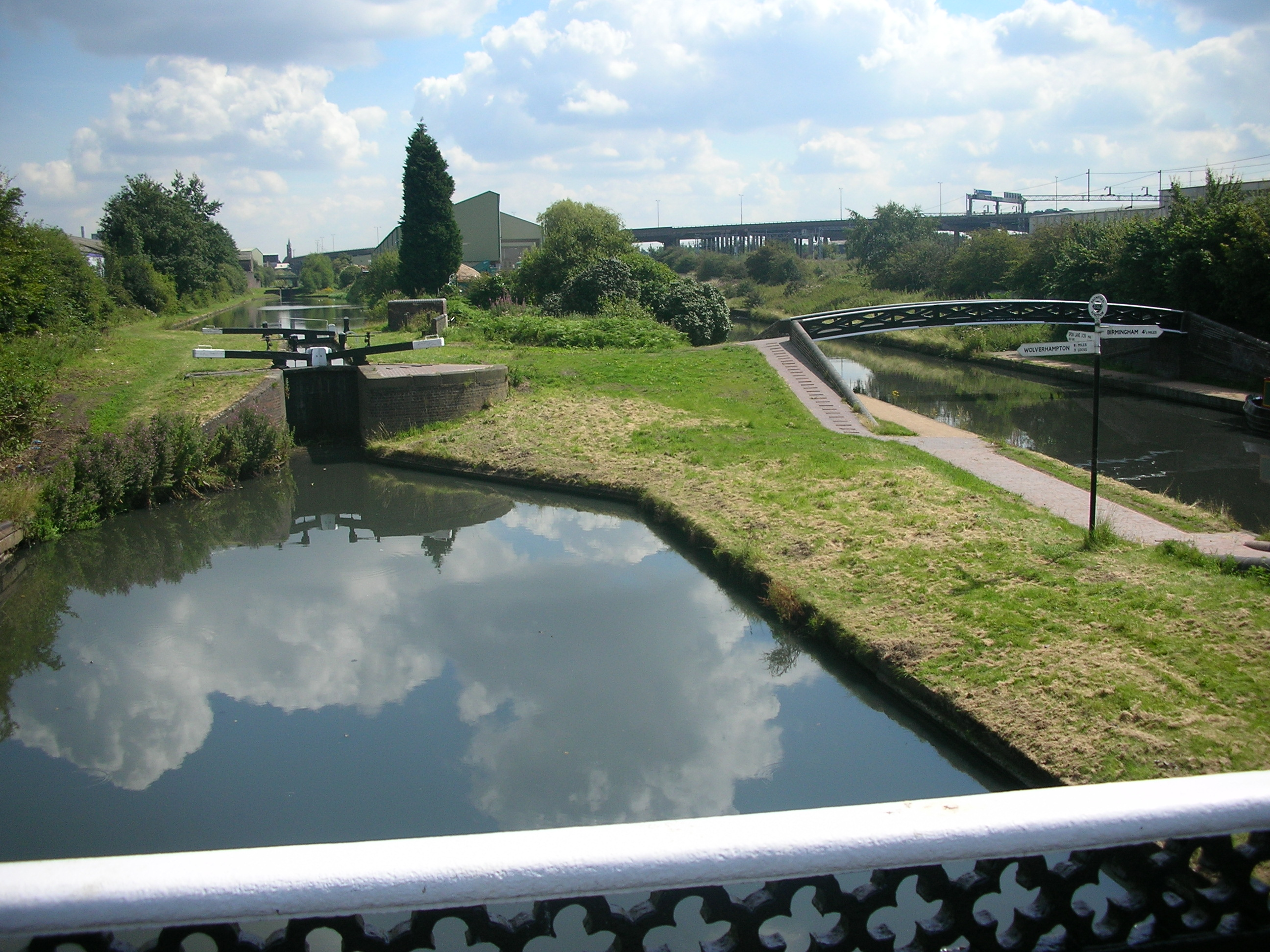
- Spon Lane bottom lock at the start of the approach to the Old Main Line, with the New Main Line to the right

Specifications
- Status: Open
- Navigation authority: Canal and River Trust

History
- Date completed: 1769

The Spon Lane Locks Branch is an 800-yard section of the BCN Main Line canal in Oldbury, England, which forms a connecting canal "sliproad" where the Old BCN Main Line crosses the New BCN Main Line at the Stewart Aqueduct. It runs westwards from Spon Lane Junction (underneath the M5 motorway) via the three Spon Lane Locks to Bromford Junction. It was originally part of the Wednesbury branch of Birmingham Canal which opened in 1769. At the top lock, there is a rare example of a split bridge, which enabled a horse to cross the canal without being detached from the barge. The rope passed through a gap at the centre of the bridge between its two halves. However, this particular example is a modern reconstruction, dating from 1986. These are probably the oldest working locks in the country. There is pedestrian access to a tow path for its entire length, but being narrow and muddy, it is not suitable for cyclists.

On the north-west corner of Spon Lane bottom lock can be found a rare example of an Ordnance Survey rivet benchmark, this one indicating a height of 140.4336 metres (460.740 ft) above sea level at Newlyn. This is one of two rivet benchmarks on this branch, the other being at Smethwick Middle Lock.

Point	Coordinates (Links to map resources)	OS Grid Ref	Notes
Spon Lane Junction	52.5066°N 1.9951°W	SP003898	Wolverhampton Level
Bromford Junction	52.5070°N 2.0051°W	SO996899	Birmingham Level
