= Smethwick Junction (canal) =

Canal junction in the West Midlands, England

Coordinates: 52.4988°N 1.9587°W

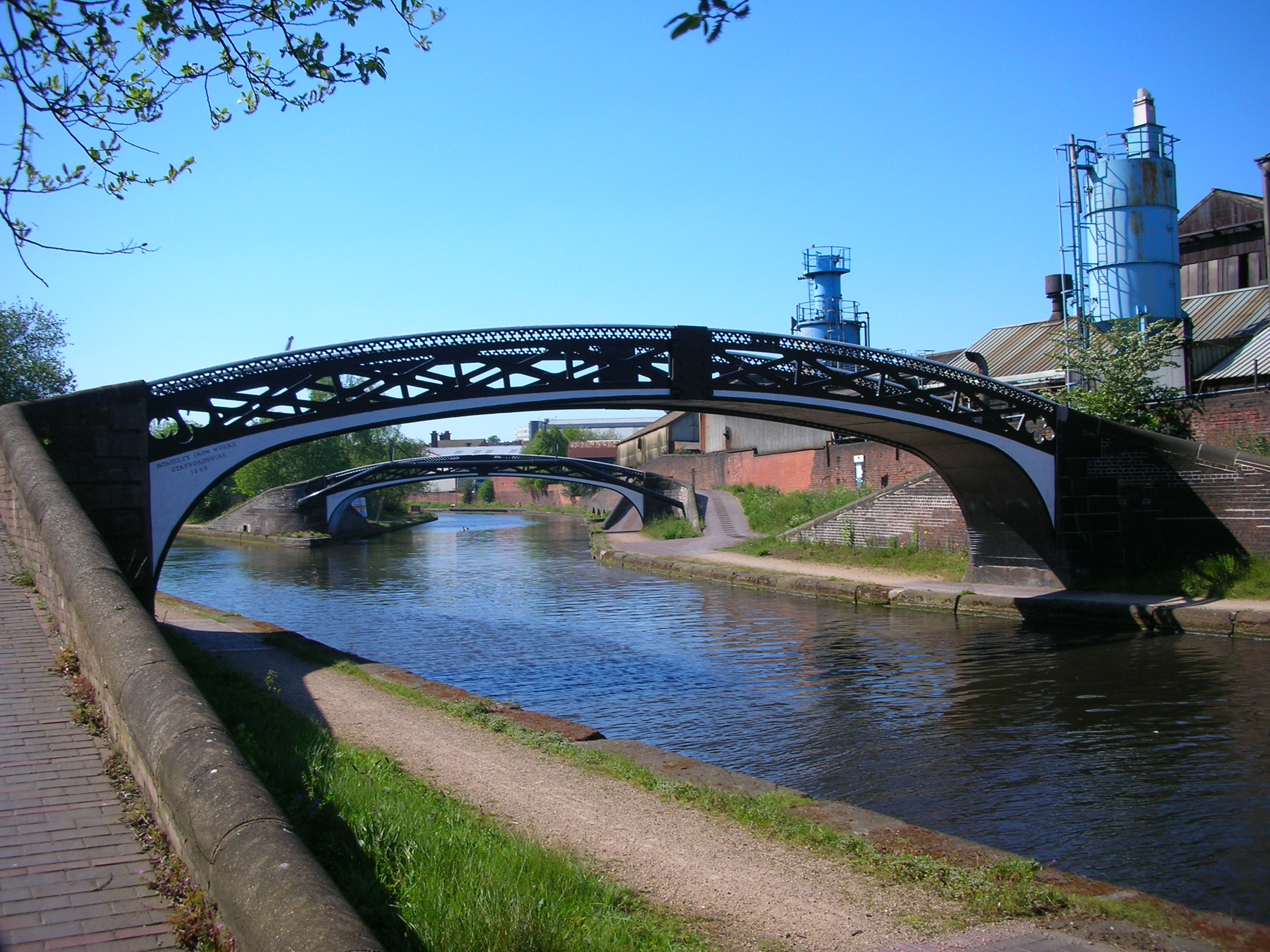
- Two Horseley Ironworks roving bridges - the further bridge spanning the Old Main Line

Specifications
- Status: Open
- Navigation authority: British Waterways

History
- Date completed: 1829

Smethwick Junction (grid reference SP028890) is the name of the canal junctions where the Birmingham Canal Navigations Main Line Canal from Birmingham splits into the BCN Old Main Line and the BCN New Main Line near to Smethwick, West Midlands, England.

== History ==
The Birmingham Canal was authorised by an Act of Parliament in 1768, and ran from Aldersley Junction, where it joined the Staffordshire and Worcestershire Canal, to central Birmingham. Twenty locks (later 21) raised the level of the line through 132 feet (40 m) immediately after Aldersley Junction, and it then followed the 473-foot (144 m) contour, which later became known as the Wolverhampton Level, to Spon Lane, where three locks raised it to 491 feet (150 m) to pass over Smethwick summit, and shortly afterwards, six locks dropped it to the 453-foot (138 m) Birmingham Level, which it followed for the rest of the way to its terminus. Traffic on the canal increased rapidly, and the summit level was lowered in the 1790s, cutting out three of the locks at each side. At the same time, the remaining three Smethwick locks were duplicated, to speed the passage of boats.

As trade continued to increase, the Smethwick summit caused problems, both of water supply and of congestion, and so the company commissioned Thomas Telford to construct a new main line. This would follow more recent practice, using cuttings and embankments to follow a much straighter path, and the resultant main line, now called the new main line, shortened James Brindley's winding contour canal by around 7.5 miles (12.1 km) to 15 miles (24 km). The new line left the old line at Factory Junction near Tipton, and descended through three locks to reach the Birmingham Level. It intercepted the Wednesbury Canal at Pudding Green Junction, and created a straighter route to the bottom of Spon Lane Locks, which had previously linked the Wednesbury Canal to the Smethwick summit. At Smethwick, the summit was bypassed by a huge cutting, up to 71-foot (22 m) deep in places. However, the original line was retained and became known as the old main line. Work began in 1823 and was completed in 1838. Smethwick Junction was the point at which the old and new main lines joined, at the eastern end of Smethwick summit. The cutting and hence the junction opened on 18 December 1829. Bromford Junction served the similar function at the western end of the cutting.

== Location ==
Smethwick Junction has two Horseley Ironworks roving bridges dated 1828. They were built as part of Thomas Telford's improvements to the Birmingham Canal. One crosses the main line to the east of the junction, and the other crosses the old main line to the west. Each bridge has a span of 52.5 feet (16.0 m) and the arch rises 9 feet (2.7 m). The semi-elliptical form gives greater headroom above the towpaths. The ribs were manufactured in two parts and are bolted at the crown. They have an X-lattice structure with a decorative quatrefoil pattern below the handrail. The deck is of cast-iron plates with raised ribs 2.5 inches (6.4 cm) high cast on their upper surfaces to help retain the earth filling which forms the footway. The bridge abutments and wing walls are of brick with stone facings at the corners. There are deep cuts in the ironwork of the bridges caused by the abrasion of tow-ropes. Both bridges are grade II listed structures, but the one to the west is in the best condition, as the eastern bridge has had one of its abutments repaired in the twentieth century with modern brick and concrete.

From the junction, the main line heads eastwards, and is level for 2.6 miles (4.2 km) to Worcester Bar, the junction with the Worcester and Birmingham Canal. There is a towpath on both sides of the channel. The new main line is straight ahead in the other direction, and is level for 5.5 miles (8.9 km) to the bottom of the three Factory Locks, which raise the canal to the Wolverhampton level. The old main line turns to the north, and then runs broadly parallel to the new main line. Just beyond the junction are the three Smethwick locks, each duplicated in the 1790s, which raise the canal 20 feet (6.1 m) from the Birmingham Level to the Wolverhampton Level of 473 feet (144 m). There is a towpath on the south bank only, and water for the summit is supplied by the Smethwick pumping station, which pumps water from the lower level.

== See also ==
- Canals of the United Kingdom
- History of the British canal system

== Bibliography ==
- Cragg, Roger (1997). Wales and West Central England: Wales and West Central England, (2nd Ed). Thomas Telford. ISBN 0-7277-2576-9.
- Cumberlidge, Jane (2009). Inland Waterways of Great Britain (8th Ed.). Imray Laurie Norie and Wilson. ISBN 978-1-84623-010-3.
- Hadfield, Charles (1985). The Canals of the West Midlands. David and Charles. ISBN 0-7153-8644-1.
- Nicholson (2003). Nicholson Waterways Guide (Vol 3): Birmingham and the heart of England. Harper Collins. ISBN 0-00-713666-8.
- Canal Companion - Birmingham Canal Navigations. J. M. Pearson & Associates. 1989. ISBN 0-907864-49-X.
