= Spon Lane Junction =

Coordinates: 52.5066°N 1.9951°W

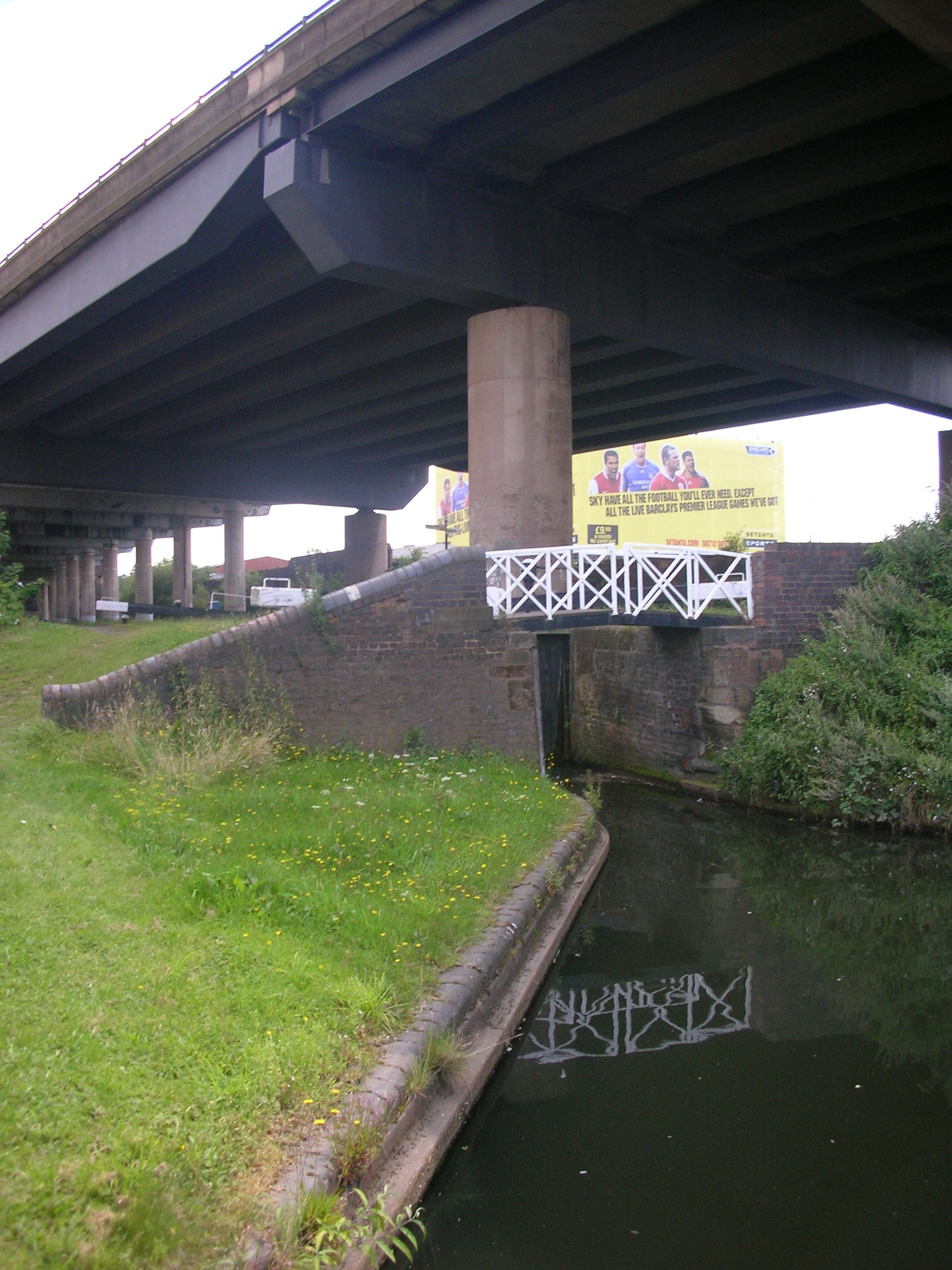
- Spon Lane top lock, split bridge, and junction, beneath the M5 motorway
- Interactive map of Spon Lane Junction

Specifications
- Status: Open
- Navigation authority: British Waterways

History
- Date completed: 1772

Spon Lane Junction (grid reference SP003898) is the original junction of the Wednesbury Canal and the Birmingham Canal, near Oldbury in the West Midlands, England.

== History ==
The 1768 Act of Parliament which authorised the building of the Birmingham Canal to Wolverhampton included a lucrative branch to the coal mines of Wednesbury, which was completed the following year, allowing coal to be shipped cheaply to Birmingham. Between the two termini, there was a ridge of high ground at Smethwick, which was crossed by building a flight of six locks at Smethwick, and another six at Spon Lane. Both ends were at what became known as the Birmingham Level of 453 feet (138 m) above sea level, but the locks raised the level by 38 feet (12 m) to 491 feet (150 m). When building of the Birmingham Canal main line continued towards Wolverhampton and the Staffordshire and Worcestershire Canal at Aldersley Junction, Spon Lane Junction was formed half way down the Spon Lane flight of locks, at the Wolverhampton Level of 473 feet (144 m). The canal was level to Wolverhampton, where it dropped through twenty locks (later increased by one) to reach the Staffordshire and Worcestershire Canal. The main line opened in September 1772.

Water supply to the Smethwick summit was a problem, and in 1778, a Boulton and Watt pumping engine was installed at the junction, to pump water back up the top three locks of the flight to the summit. With the opening of the Broadwaters extension of the Wednesbury Canal, which served coal mines near Moxley, there was additional traffic through the junction and over the summit, and the building of the Birmingham and Fazeley Canal threatened to make the situation worse. The company therefore decided to make the summit lower in 1787, and this was achieved in two stages. The first was a new cut 12 feet (3.7 m) lower than the original summit, which eliminated two locks at either end, and was completed on 2 July 1789. Spoil from the excavations was removed using the upper line. A second new cut was then made 6 feet (1.8 m) below this, to eliminate the third lock at each end, and the spoil was removed using the middle line. The canal had to be closed for 22 days to allow the ends of the new cut to be connected to the original channels, and for it to fill with water, but the new line was operational on 6 April 1790. Spon Lane Junction was now at the top of the three Spon Lane locks. The top lock has a split bridge, which allowed horses to cross the canal without having to disconnect the towing rope, which passed through the gap between the two halves of the bridge. This particular example is, however, a 1986 reconstruction. The remaining three locks at Smethwick were duplicated at the same time. The pumping engine at the junction now served no purpose and was removed.

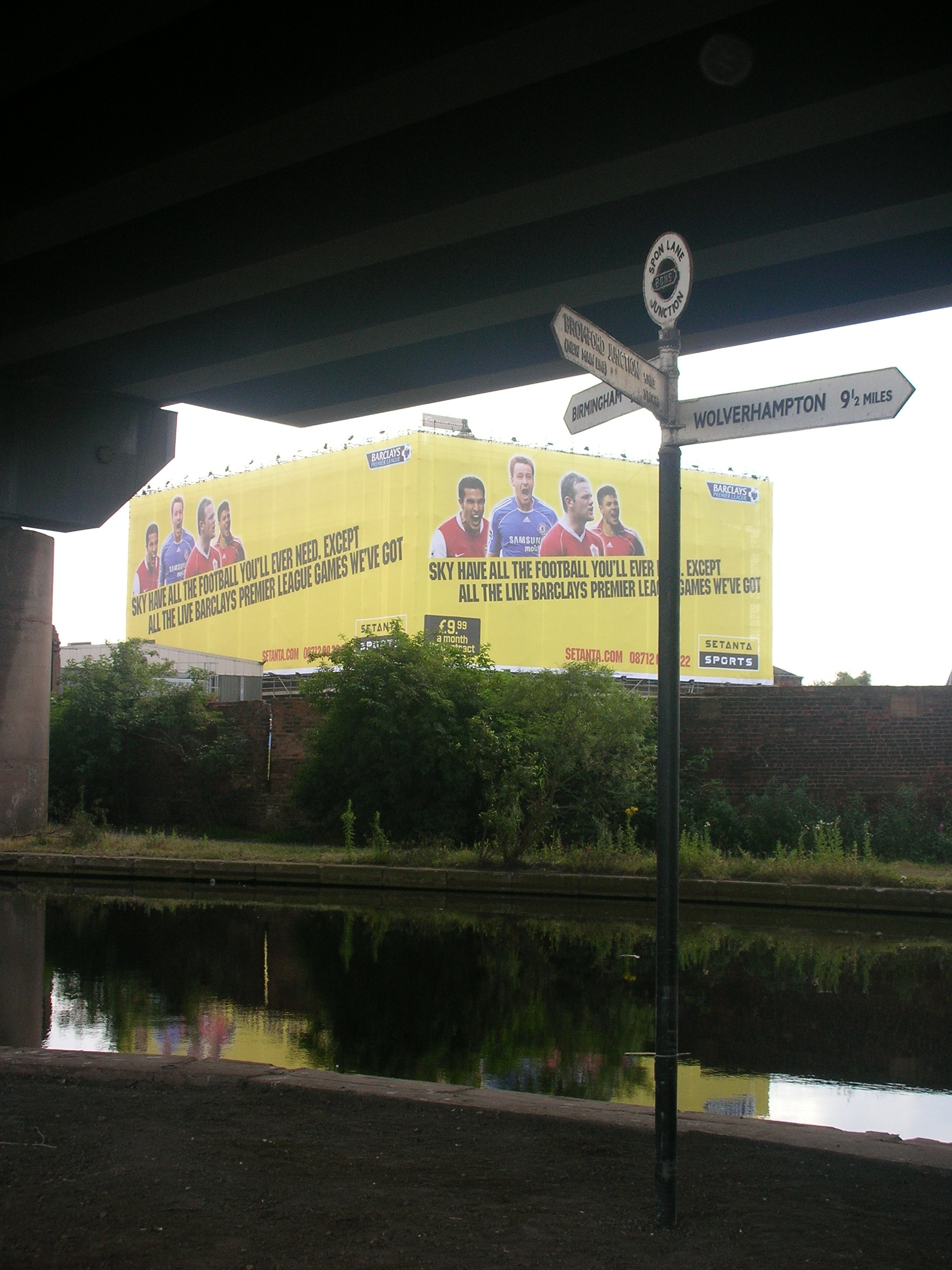
Spon Lane Junction signpost in front of a tarpaulin covering Chance's Glassworks 'seven storey' building

Traffic on the system continued to expand, and in 1825 the engineer Thomas Telford was asked to construct a new main line. Like all of Telford's designs, this would use cuttings and embankments to follow a straight course across the landscape, and his new route reduced the length of the canal by 7.5 miles (12.1 km) to 15 miles (24 km) compared to James Brindley's contour canal. It intersected the Wednesbury Canal at Pudding Green Junction, and was widened and straightened between there and the bottom of Spon Lane Locks, where Bromford Junction was created. From the junction, a huge cutting created the fourth route to Smethwick Junction, in places up to 71 feet (22 m) deep. It passed under the Old Main Line close to Spon Lane Junction to reach its destination. Apart from three locks at Factory Junction, where it left the old main line, it was all built on the Birmingham Level. The old route, which included Spon Lane Junction, was retained.

When the top three locks of the Spon Lane flight were no longer required, as a result of the lowering of the summit, they were simply filled with earth and abandoned. They were uncovered again briefly in July 1969 during the construction of the M5 motorway, but were destroyed to make way for the new road.

== Location ==
The junction is on the 473-foot (144 m) Wolverhampton Level, at the top of the three locks that descend to Wednesbury. They are now known as the Spon Lane Locks Branch, and are some of the oldest unaltered locks in the country, as they are virtually unchanged since they were built by James Brindley. The junction and the top lock are now under an elevated section of the M5 motorway, and all three of the locks are grade II listed structures. From the junction to the top of Smethwick locks, the canal is level for 1.6 miles (2.6 km)

The Old Main Line passes over the New Main Line on the Stewart Aqueduct. The two skew arches are elliptical in shape, and it is built in brick with sandstone dressings and cast iron railings. The Old Main Line continues on the level for 10 miles (16 km) to the top of the Wolverhampton flight of locks, meeting the New Main Line at Factory Junction after 4.7 miles (7.6 km). The New Main Line to the east of Bromford Junction is also known as the Island Line.

== See also ==
- Canals of the United Kingdom
- History of the British canal system

== Bibliography ==
- Broadbridge, S. R. (1974). The Birmingham Canal Navigations, Vol. 1 1768 - 1846. David & Charles. ISBN 0-7509-2077-7.
- Cumberlidge, Jane (2009). Inland Waterways of Great Britain (8th Ed.). Imray Laurie Norie and Wilson. ISBN 978-1-84623-010-3.
- Hadfield, Charles (1985). The Canals of the West Midlands. David and Charles. ISBN 0-7153-8644-1.
- Nicholson (2003). Nicholson Waterways Guide (Vol 3): Birmingham and the heart of England. Harper Collins. ISBN 0-00-713666-8.
- Pearson, Michael (1989). Canal Companion - Birmingham Canal Navigations. J. M. Pearson & Associates. ISBN 0-907864-49-X.
