= BCN Main Line =

Birmingham Canal UK

- Interactive map of BCN Main Line

Specifications
- Status: Navigable

Geography
- Connects to: Staffordshire and Worcestershire Canal; Worcester and Birmingham Canal

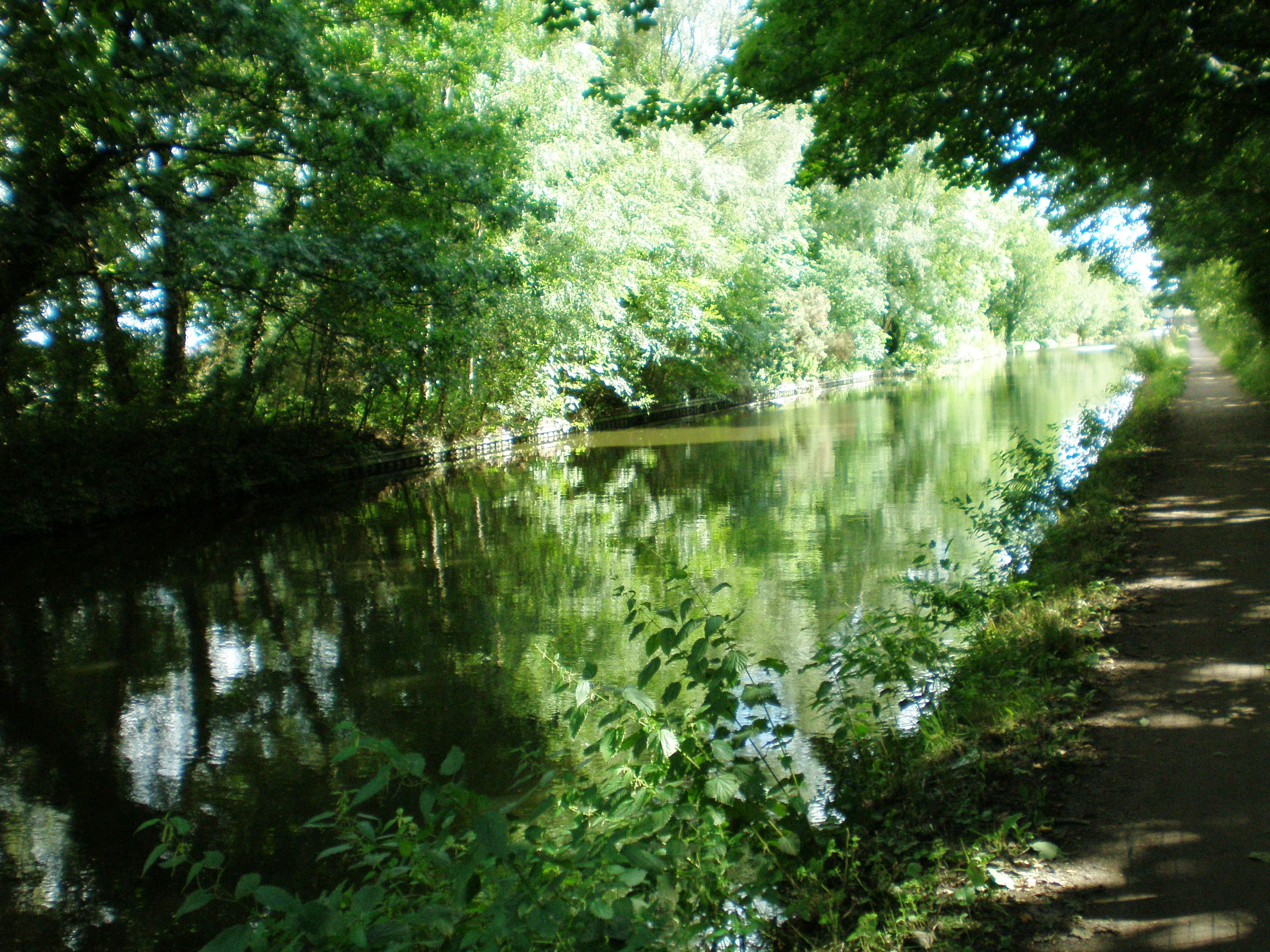
Worcester and Birmingham Canal, Edgbaston

The BCN Main Line, or Birmingham Canal Navigations Main Line is the evolving route of the Birmingham Canal between Birmingham and Wolverhampton in England.

The name Main Line was used to distinguish the main Birmingham to Wolverhampton route from the many other canals and branches built or acquired by the Birmingham Canal Navigations company.

== BCN Old Main Line ==
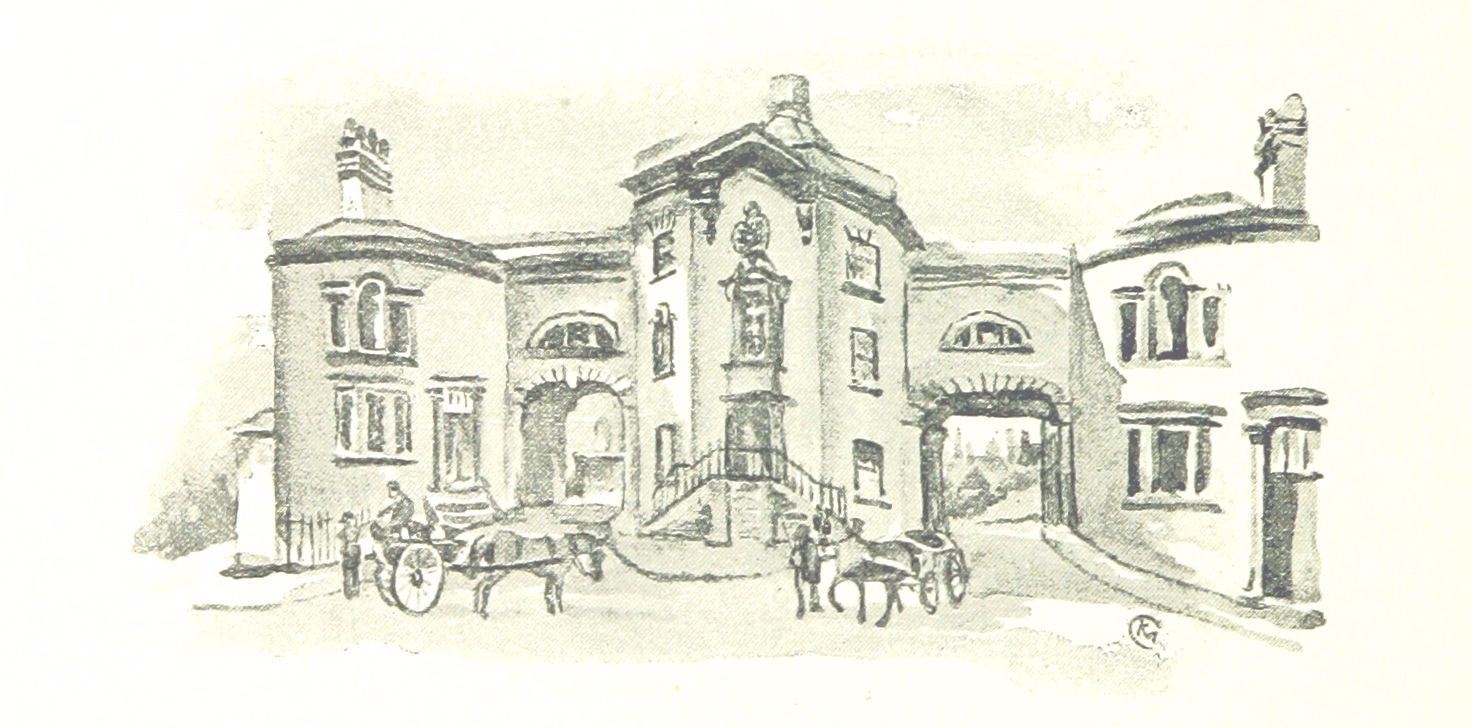
Birmingham Canal Company offices fronting Paradise Street. They backed onto the Old Wharf terminus.

On 24 January 1767, a number of prominent Birmingham businessmen, including Matthew Boulton and others from the Lunar Society, held a public meeting in the White Swan, High Street, Birmingham to consider the possibility of building a canal from Birmingham to the Staffordshire and Worcestershire Canal near Wolverhampton, taking in the coalfields of the Black Country. They commissioned the canal engineer James Brindley to propose a route. Brindley came back with a largely level but meandering route via Smethwick, Oldbury, Tipton, Bilston and Wolverhampton to Aldersley.

On 24 February 1768, an Act of Parliament was passed to allow the building of the canal, with branches at Ocker Hill and Wednesbury where there were coal mines. The Staffordshire and Worcestershire company was given the right to make the connection to their canal if the Birmingham company failed to do so within six months of opening. On 2 March Brindley was appointed engineer. The first phase of building was to Wednesbury whereupon the price of coal sold to domestic households in Birmingham halved overnight. Vested interests of the sponsors caused the creation of two terminal wharves in Birmingham. The 1772 Newhall Branch and wharf (now built upon) originally extended north of, and parallel to Great Charles Street. The 1773 Paradise Street Branch split off at Old Turn Junction and headed through Broad Street Tunnel, turned left at what is now Gas Street Basin and under Bridge Street to wharves on a tuning fork-shaped pair of long basins: Paradise Wharf, also called Old Wharf. The Birmingham Canal Company head office was finally built there, opposite the western end of Paradise Street.

By 6 November 1769, 10 miles (16 km) had been completed to Hill Top collieries in West Bromwich, with a one-mile summit pound at Smethwick. Brindley had tried to dig a tunnel through the hill at Smethwick but had encountered ground too soft to cope with. The canal rose from what is now the Birmingham Level through six narrow (7 ft, 2.1 m) locks to the summit level and descended through another six at Spon Lane. Water was brought from purpose-built reservoirs: Smethwick Great Reservoir (now built upon, holding 1514 locks of water), another smaller pool at Smethwick (holding 500 locks), and then from Titford Pool to supply the summit level.

In 1770 work started towards Wolverhampton, from above the third Spon Lane lock at what is now the Wolverhampton Level. On 21 September 1772 the canal was joined with the Staffordshire and Worcestershire Canal at Aldersley Junction via another 20 locks (increased to 21 in 1784 to save water). Brindley died a few days later. The canal measured 22 5/8 miles (36.4 km), mostly following the contour of the land but with deviations to factories and mines in the Black Country and Birmingham. A branch led to Matthew Boulton's Soho Manufactory.

=== Water shortage ===
The original Birmingham Canal was extremely successful but there was a problem with supplying sufficient water to the Smethwick Summit. Matthew Boulton's partner, James Watt, had just patented an improvement to the steam engine involving an external condenser which improved the efficiency (and therefore reduced the amount of coal needed to run it). Steam engines were constructed at either end of the Smethwick Summit to pump water used in the operation of the locks back to the summit. The Smethwick Engine (5 June 1779) pumped water from the Birmingham side of the summit, and another, the Spon Lane Engine (April 1778) operated from the Wolverhampton side.

In 1784, after two years of counter-productive attempts at legislation, the Birmingham and Fazeley Canal Company (created to propose a competitive canal from the coal fields to Birmingham and also a link to the Coventry Canal at Fazeley) merged with the Birmingham Canal Company (ten years later the name of the merged company was changed to the Birmingham Canal Navigations Company) and the Birmingham and Fazeley Canal was started. This created an even greater need for water to supply the thirteen locks at Farmer's Bridge and eleven at Aston, all running downhill and taking water out of the Birmingham system.

=== Smeaton's improvements ===
There were problems of congestion at Smethwick caused by the time taken to traverse the locks and with supplying sufficient water to the summit level. John Smeaton was engaged to advise on a solution. He specified a 1000-yard cutting through the top eighteen feet of the summit, eliminating three locks from each end, and doubling the capacity of the descent at Smethwick locks by building a parallel flight of three locks, in use until the 1960s. The changes were made in two phases with a new cut to the side to remove two locks from each end and lower the summit by twelve feet, and then another parallel cut another six feet lower, removing another lock at each end and the provision of a parallel set of three locks at the Smethwick end. In 1790, after 2 1/2 years the cutting was completed. The canal was closed for only 14 days. The lowered summit was at the Wolverhampton Level and simplified water supply. Water was also pumped from several local coal mines. The Spon Lane engine was removed and sold but the Smethwick Engine continued to be used to pump used water from the Birmingham Level.

=== Other changes ===
The Act allowed for branches to extend from the main line, and for private wharves and basins. In May 1821 the loop of the main line around Oldbury was bypassed by a straight cut, shortening the route between Birmingham and Wolverhampton.

== BCN New Main Line ==
Over the next thirty years, as more canals and branches were built or connected it became necessary to review the long, winding, narrow Old Main Line. With a single towpath boats passing in opposite directions had to negotiate their horses and ropes. As traffic grew the locks at Smethwick Summit were still a constriction.

In 1824 Thomas Telford was commissioned to examine alternatives. He famously travelled the route of the Old Line and reported the existing canal as:

"... little more than a crooked ditch, with scarcely the appearance of a towing path, the horses frequently sliding and staggering in the water, the hauling lines sweeping the gravel into the canal, and the entanglement at the meeting of boats being incessant; whilst at the locks at each end of the short summit at Smethwick, crowds of boatmen were always quarrelling, or offering premiums for the preference of passage; the mine owners injured by the delay, were loud in their just complaints."

Telford proposed major changes to the section between Birmingham and Smethwick, widening and straightening the canal, providing towpaths on each side, and cutting through Smethwick Summit to bypass the locks, allowing lock-free passage from Birmingham to Tipton. Telford's proposals were swayed by the threat of a new Birmingham to Liverpool railway. His suggestions were accepted and he was appointed chief engineer on 28 June 1824.

By 1827 the New Main Line passed straight through, and linked to, the loops of the Old Main Line, creating Oozells Loop, Icknield Port Loop, Soho Loop, Cape Loop and Soho Foundry Loop, allowing continued access to the existing factories and wharves.

A year earlier he had built an improved Rotton Park Reservoir (Edgbaston Reservoir) on the site of an existing fish pool, bringing its capacity to 300 million imperial gallons (1,400,000 m^{3}). A canal feeder took water to, and along, a raised embankment on the south side of the New Main Line to his new Engine Arm branch canal and across an elegant cast iron aqueduct to top up the higher Wolverhampton Level at Smethwick Summit. The reservoir also fed water to the Birmingham Level at the adjacent Icknield Port Loop.

The Smethwick Summit was bypassed by 71 ft (22 m) cutting through Lunar Society member, Samuel Galton's land, creating the Galton Valley, 70 feet deep and 150 feet wide, running parallel to the Old Main Line. Telford's changes here were completed in 1829.

Telford designed a cast iron bridge, the Galton Bridge, to span his cutting. It was cast in the Horseley Iron Works, as was the Engine Arm Aqueduct and many of the wide roving bridges.

In 1837, after Telford's death, a new section of his planned canal was opened together with the 360 yard Coseley Tunnel, complete with double towpath, cutting out the long detour around Coseley and Wednesbury Oak, and therefore relegating it as the Wednesbury Oak Loop. As with many of the branch canals on the BCN, most of the Wednesbury Oak Loop became officially abandoned from 1954, but the northern stretch remains navigable to the British Waterways workshops at Bradley.

By 1838 the New Main Line was complete: 22 5/8 miles (36.4 km) of slow canal reduced to 15 5/8 miles (25.1 km); between Birmingham and Tipton, it was a lock-free dual carriageway. It was also called the Island Line as it was cut straight through the hill at Smethwick known as the Island.

== Later ==
In 1892 the Smethwick Engine was replaced by a new pumping house between the old and new canals, just north of Brasshouse Lane Bridge in Smethwick.

Late in the 20th century, a pair of concrete tunnels near Galton Bridge were built to carry the Telford Way road.

Ryland Aqueduct, built in 1836 carrying the canal over the main A461 road at Dudley Port, Tipton, was rebuilt in the late 1960s at a cost of £170,000 (equivalent to £2,708,800 in 2025). Demolition of the old aqueduct took place in September 1967. In 1991 at a cost of £22,000 its bare concrete structure was painted blue and white and included a frieze of a narrowboat crossing an old-fashioned brick aqueduct.

The Smethwick Summit - Galton Valley Conservation Area protects the Old and New lines between the Birmingham city boundary and Spon Lane locks.

== Features ==
=== Junctions ===
Point	Coordinates (Links to map resources)	OS Grid Ref	Notes
Gas Street Basin	52.4773°N 1.9100°W	SP061866	Worcester and Birmingham Canal
Old Turn Junction	52.4792°N 1.9139°W	SP058868	Original junction to two terminal branches in Birmingham
Sandy Turn Junction	52.4827°N 1.9259°W	SP050872	(BCN Old and New Lines meet)
Rotton Park Junction	52.4843°N 1.9291°W	SP048874	(BCN Old and New Lines cross)
Winson Green Junction	52.4912°N 1.9424°W	SP039881	(BCN Old and New Lines cross)
Soho Foundry Junction (West)	52.4972°N 1.9520°W	SP032888	(dry)
Cape Junction	52.4937°N 1.9474°W	SP035884	(short branch, originally Cape Loop) and Soho Foundry East (dry)
Smethwick Junction	52.4988°N 1.9587°W	SP028890	(BCN Old and New Lines meet)
Spon Lane Junction	52.5066°N 1.9951°W	SP003898	Spon Lane Locks Branch (originally part of the Wednesbury Canal) splits from BCN Old Line under M5 motorway
Bromford Junction	52.5070°N 2.0051°W	SO996899	BCN New Line meets Spon Lane Locks Branch (originally part of the Wednesbury Canal)
Pudding Green Junction	52.5139°N 2.0168°W	SO988907	Wednesbury Old Canal (last remaining part of original Wednesbury Canal)
Albion Junction	52.5177°N 2.0292°W	SO980911	Gower Branch Canal
Dudley Port Junction	52.5223°N 2.0432°W	SO970916	Netherton Tunnel Branch Canal
Dixon's Branch Canal	52.5258°N 2.0525°W	SO964920	(dry)
Watery Lane Junction	52.5289°N 2.0638°W	SO956923	Tipton Green Branch (dry), for Toll End Communication Canal (dry)
Tipton Factory Junction	52.5320°N 2.0745°W	SO949927	(BCN Old and New Lines meet)
Bloomfield Junction	52.5351°N 2.0795°W	SO946930	(dry) - Wednesbury Oak Loop originally rejoined
Deepfields Junction	52.5528°N 2.0904°W	SO938950	Wednesbury Oak Loop (truncated Old Main Line)
Horseley Fields Junction	52.5852°N 2.1132°W	SO923986	Wyrley and Essington Canal
Aldersley Junction	52.6079°N 2.1449°W	SJ901011	End of Main Line, Staffordshire and Worcestershire Canal
Tipton Green Junction	52.5275°N 2.0701°W	SO952922	Tipton Green Branch (dry)
Tipton Junction	52.5252°N 2.0728°W	SO950919	(for Dudley Tunnel)
Brades Hall Junction	52.5106°N 2.0334°W	SO977903	Gower Branch Canal
Oldbury Junction	52.5010°N 2.0098°W	SO993892	Titford Canal

=== Other features ===
Point	Coordinates (Links to map resources)	OS Grid Ref	Notes
Winson Green Toll Island	52.4917°N 1.9434°W	SP038882	
Smethwick Gauging Station island	52.4982°N 1.9654°W	SP023889	
Tipton Indexing Station	52.5317°N 2.0732°W	SO950926	
Smethwick top lock	52.4985°N 1.9660°W	SP023889	
Galton Bridge	52.5020°N 1.9793°W	SP014893	carrying Roebuck Lane, Smethwick
Spon Lane top lock	52.5067°N 1.9957°W	SP002899	under M5 motorway
Albion Junction Toll Island	52.5182°N 2.0305°W	SO979911	
Stewart Aqueduct	52.5059°N 1.9973°W	SP001898	(Old Main Line over New Main Line)
Rydale Aqueduct	52.5240°N 2.0486°W	SO967918	(over A461 road (Dudley Port))
Coseley Tunnel South Portal	52.5408°N 2.0861°W	SO941937	
Coseley Tunnel North Portal	52.5438°N 2.0881°W	SO940940	
South Staffordshire Railway Aqueduct	52.5246°N 2.0505°W	SO965918	(disused railway)
Wolverhampton top lock	52.5895°N 2.1225°W	SO917991	
Tividale Aqueduct	52.5164°N 2.0484°W	SO967909	(over Netherton Tunnel Branch Canal)
Engine Arm Aqueduct	52.4979°N 1.9665°W	SP022889	over BCN New Main Line, feeding water from Rotton Park Reservoir (now Edgbaston Reservoir) to the BCN Old line
New Smethwick Pumping Station	52.4981°N 1.9731°W	SP018889	Grade II listed building, pumping water from the lower Telford New Line to the Brindley Old Line
Old Smethwick Engine	52.4977°N 1.9622°W	SP025889	Old Watt engine on corner of Rolfe Street and Bridge Street

== Gallery ==
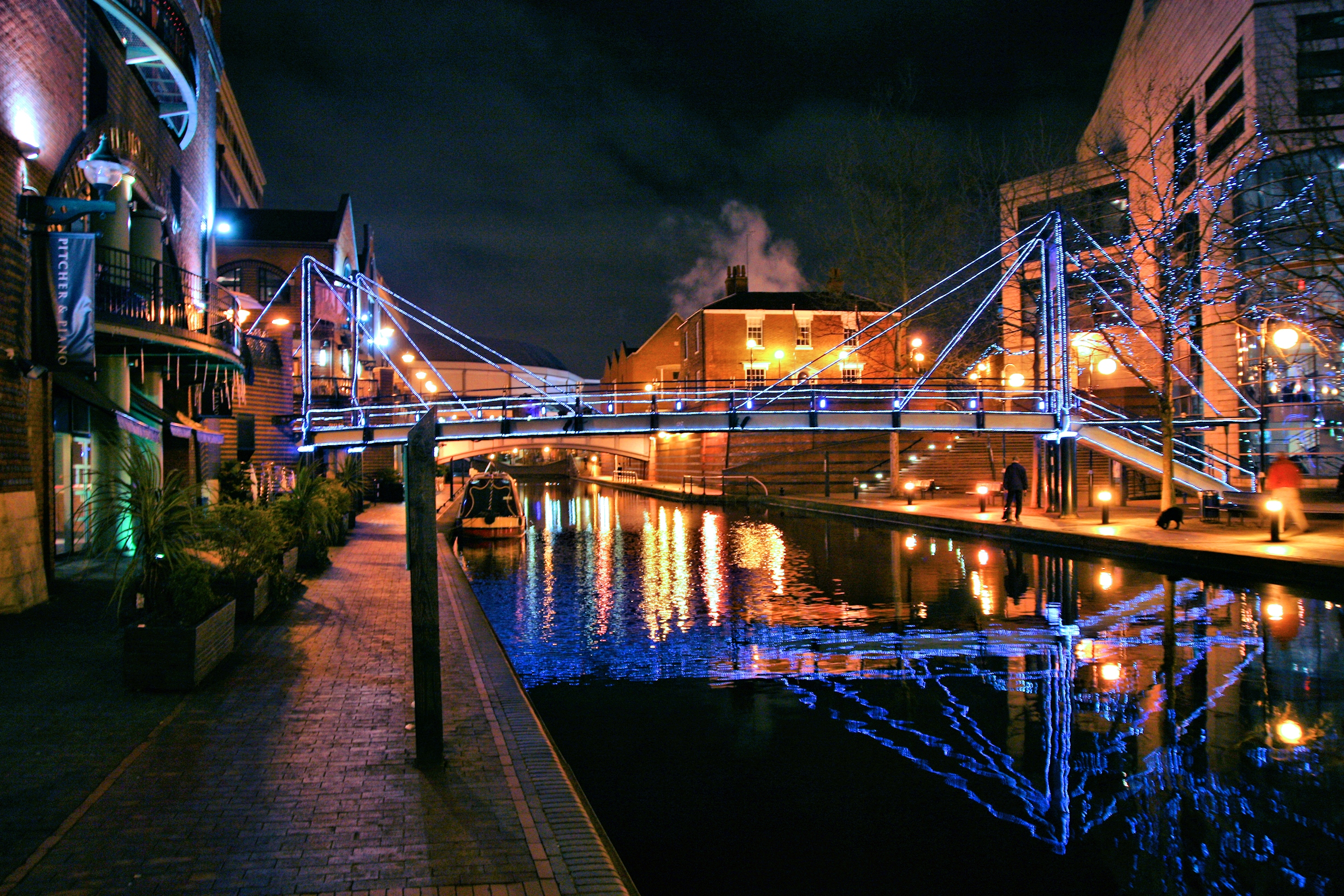
Bridge over Old Main Line in downtown Birmingham

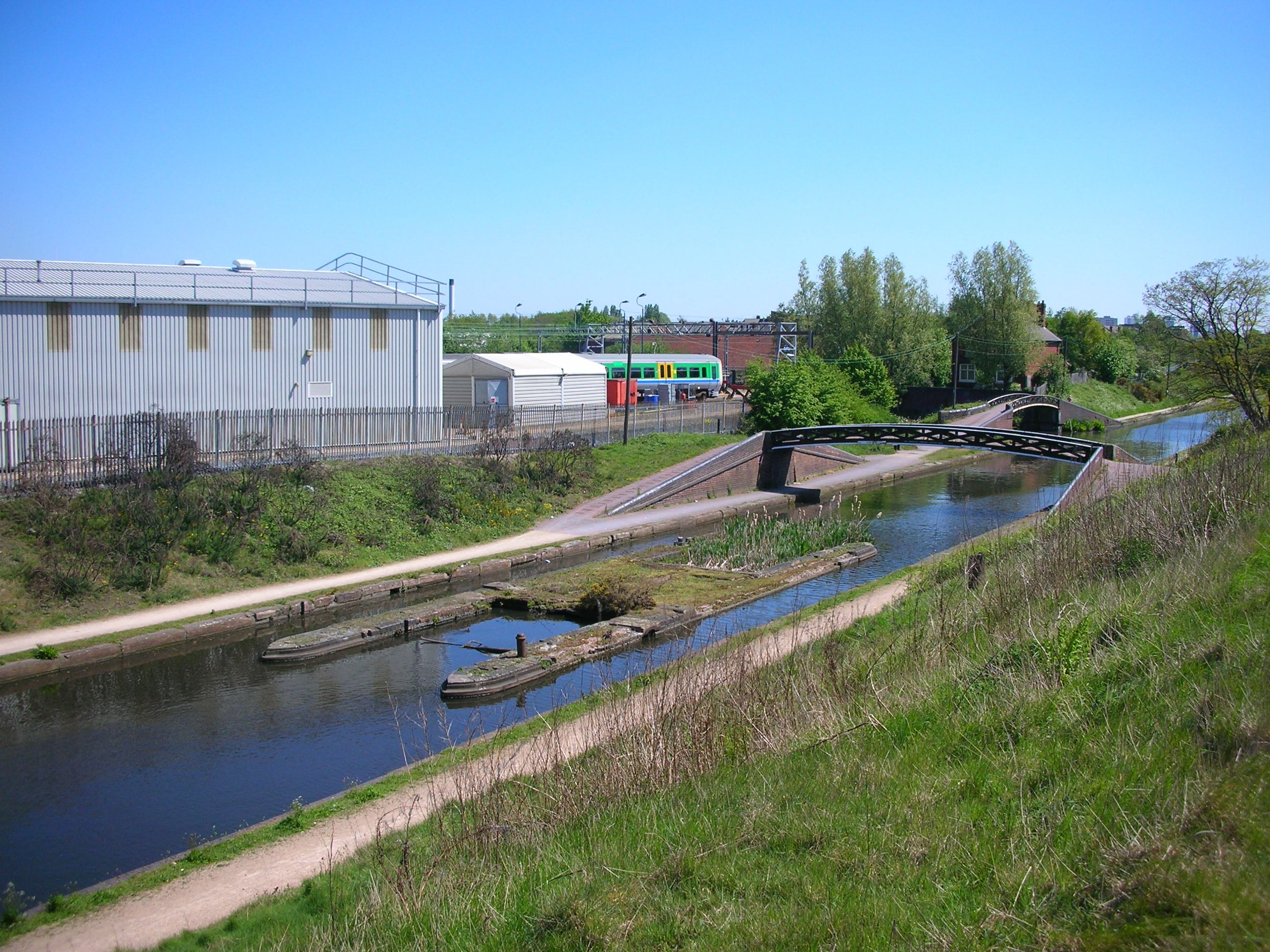
Two Horsley Ironworks bridges and derelict toll island at Winson Green Junction.

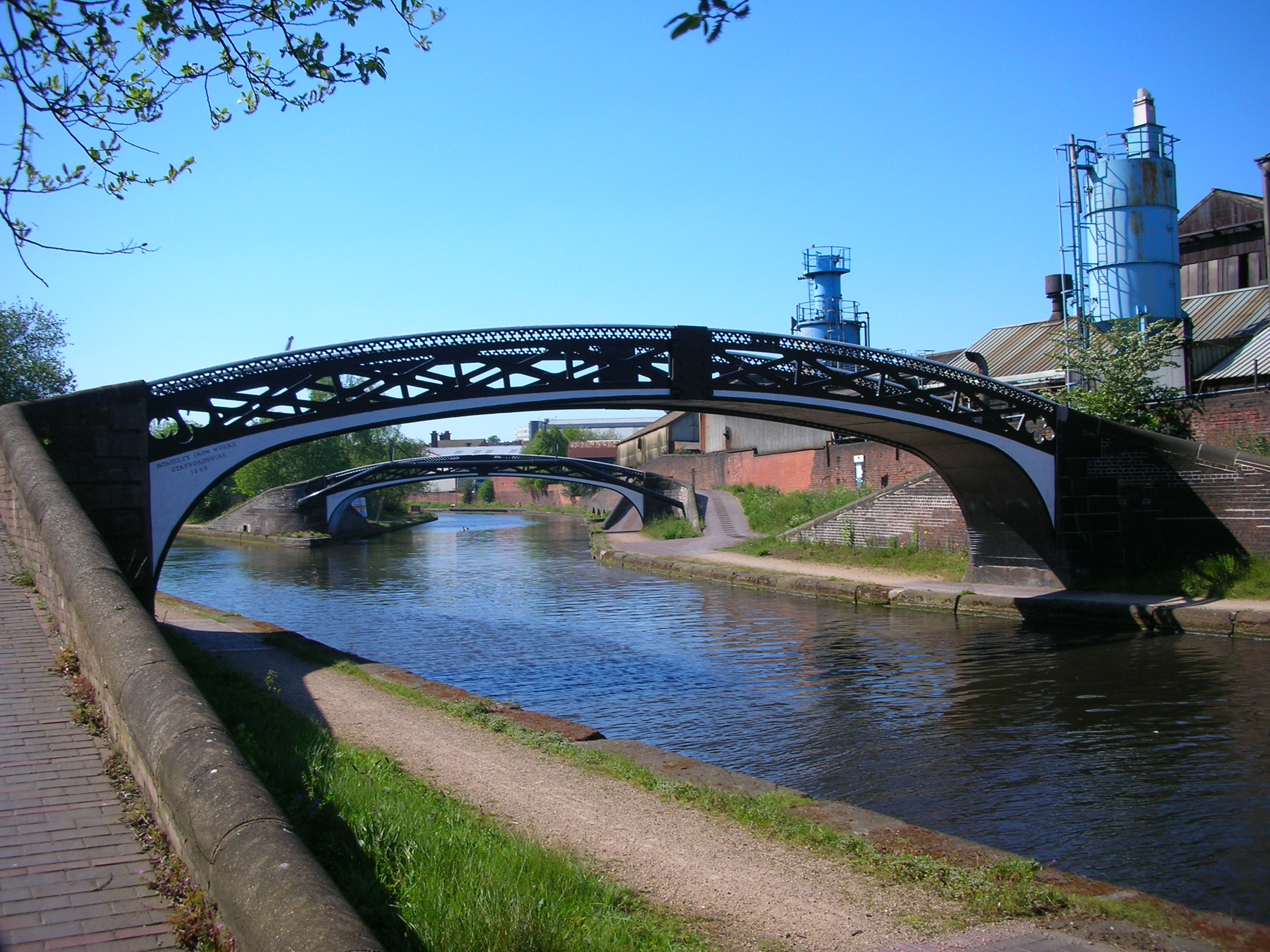
Roving bridges at Smethwick Junction.

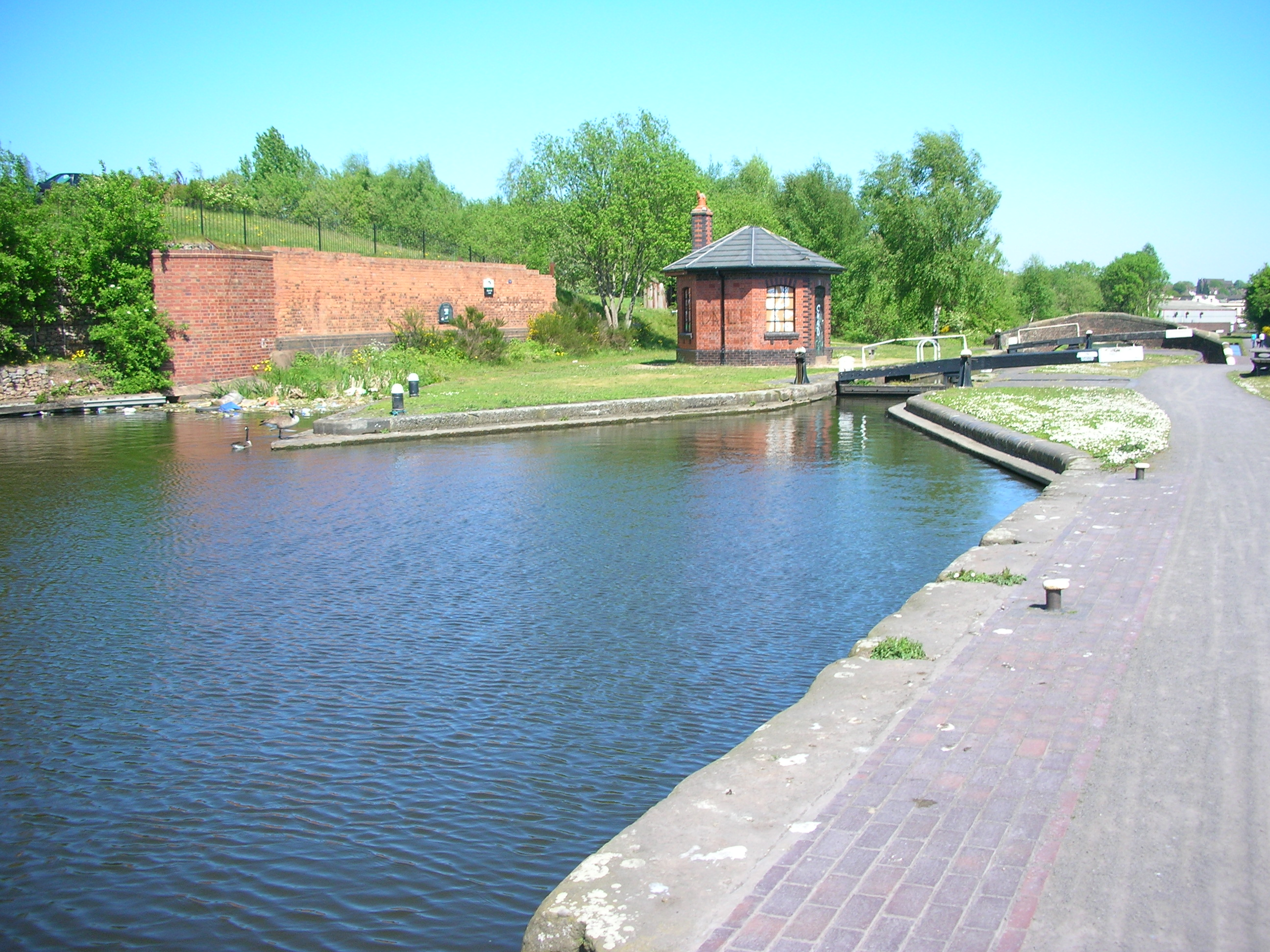
Recently constructed octagonal BCN Toll house at Smethwick top lock.

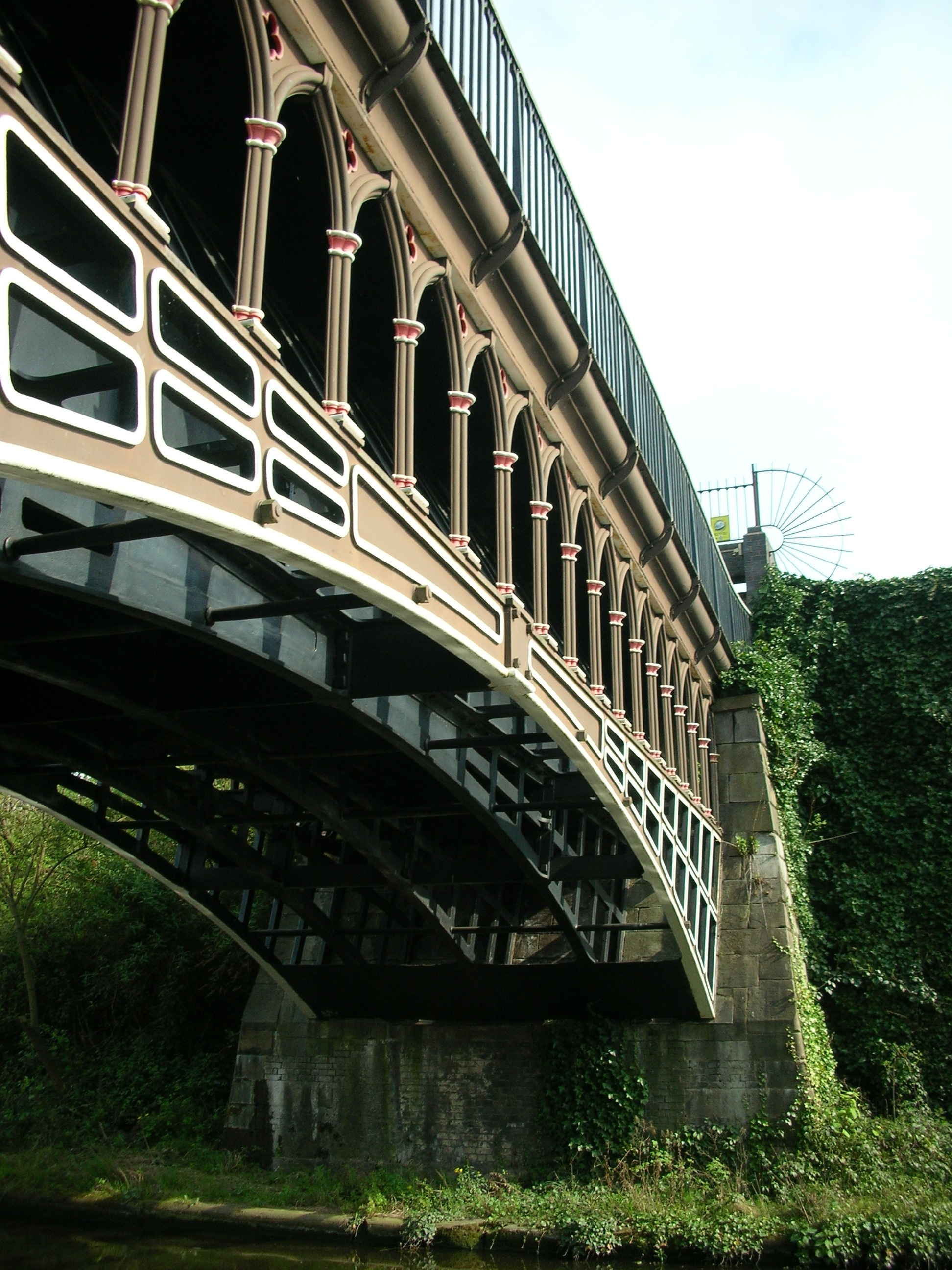
The Engine Arm Aqueduct.

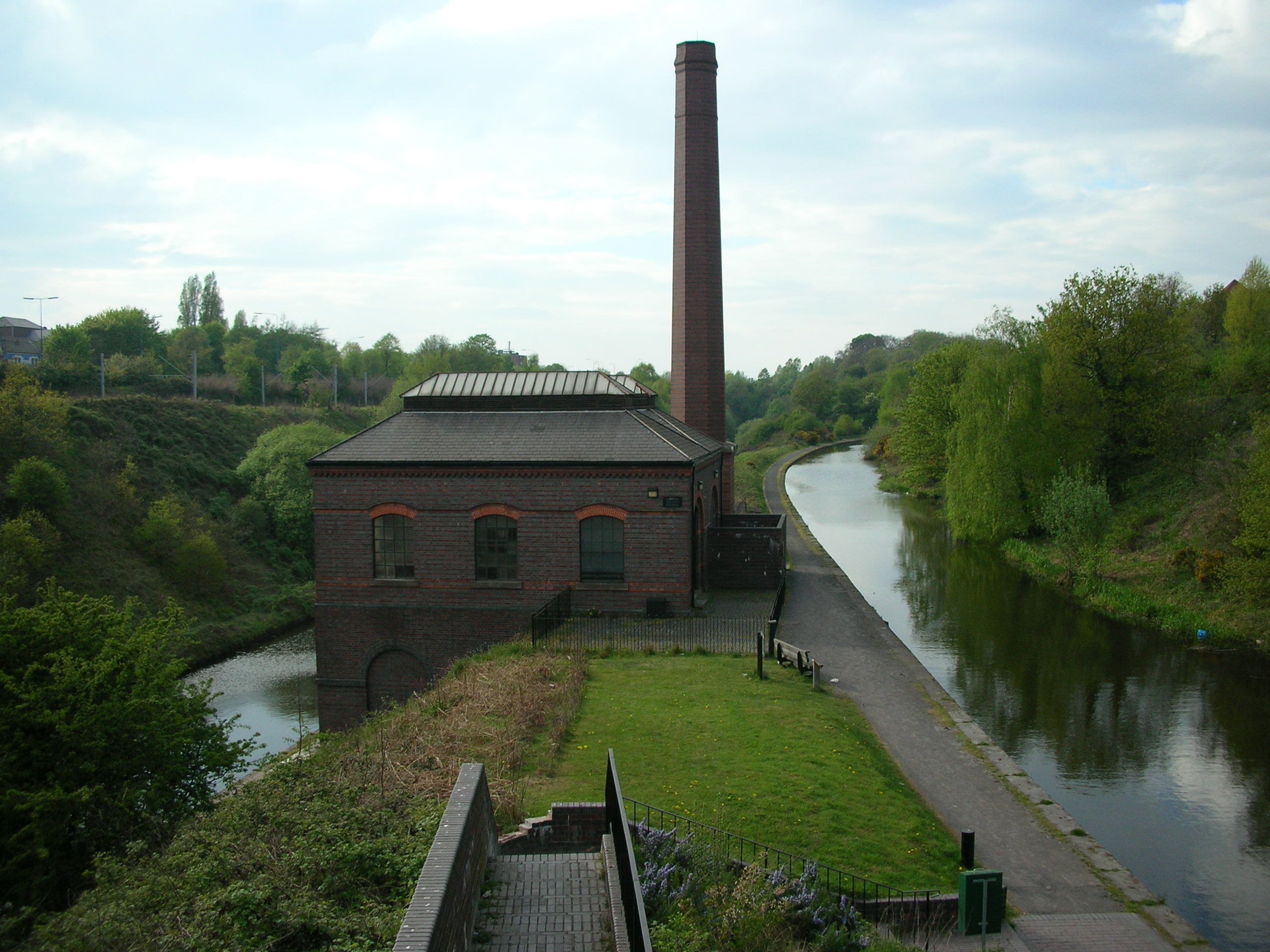
The New Smethwick Pumping Station (restored).

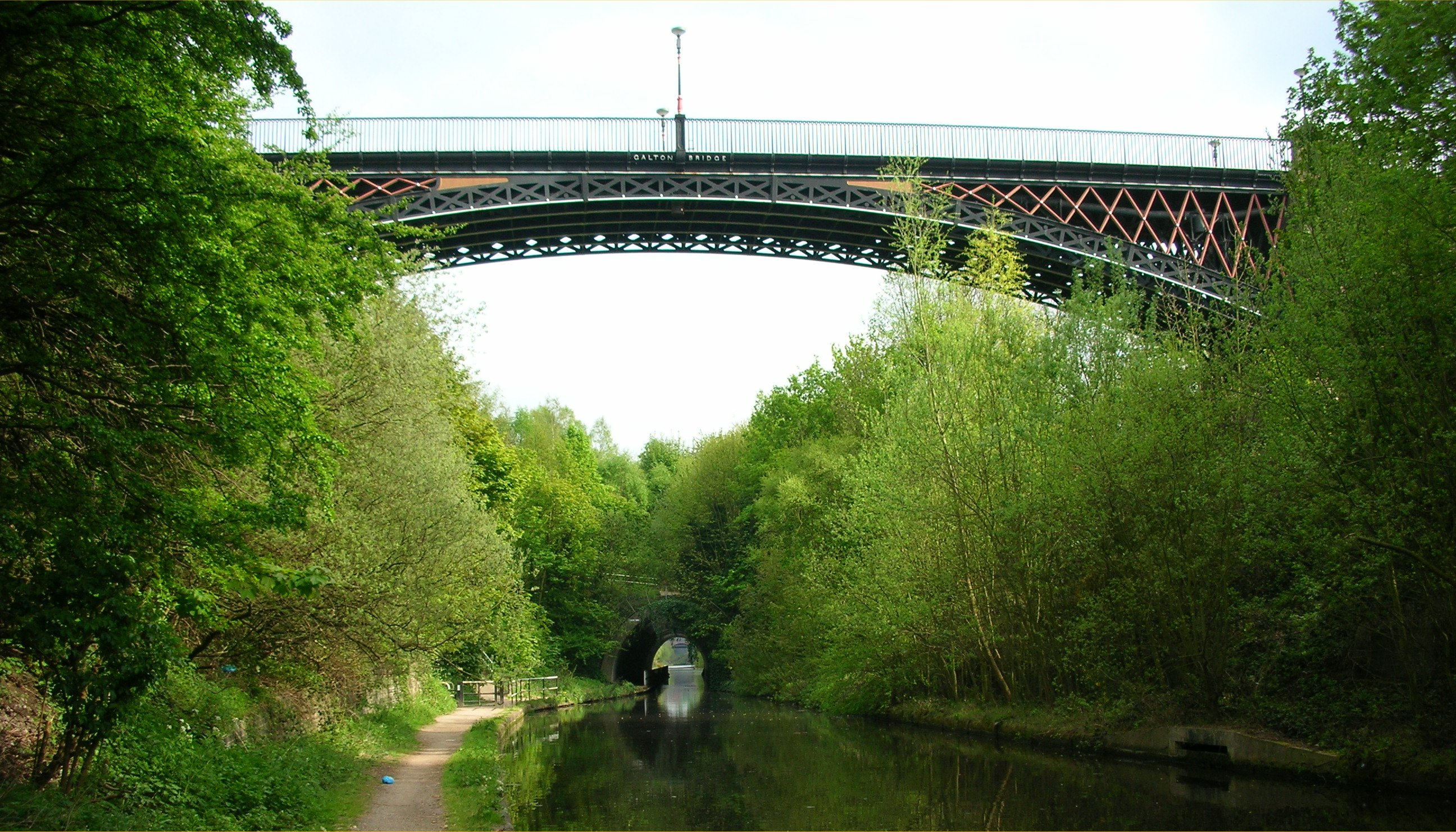
Galton Bridge and tunnel.

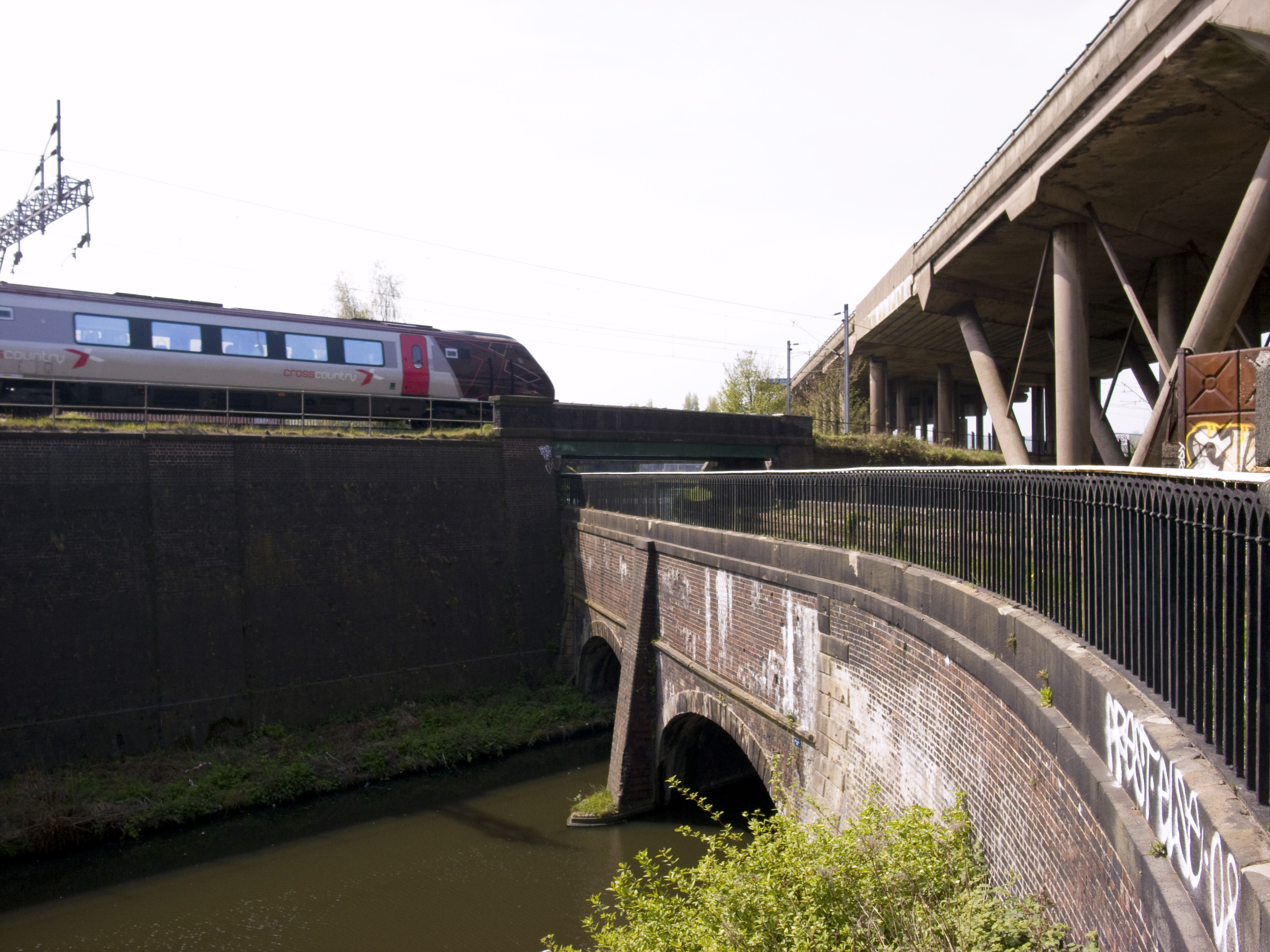
Stewart Aqueduct — Motorway (M5) over rail over canal over canal.

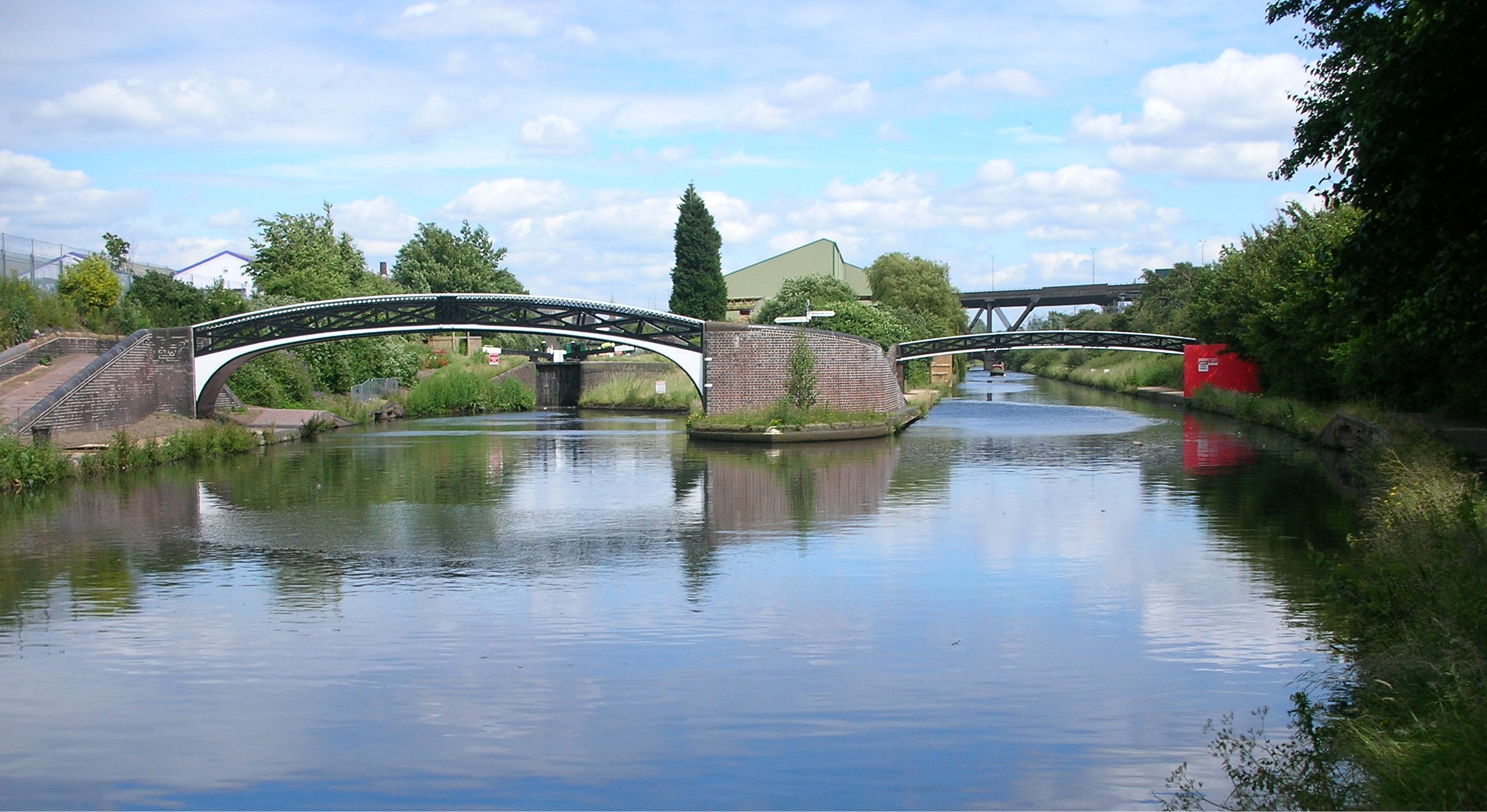
Bromford Junction - Spon Lane bottom lock visible through one of the Horseley Ironworks bridges.

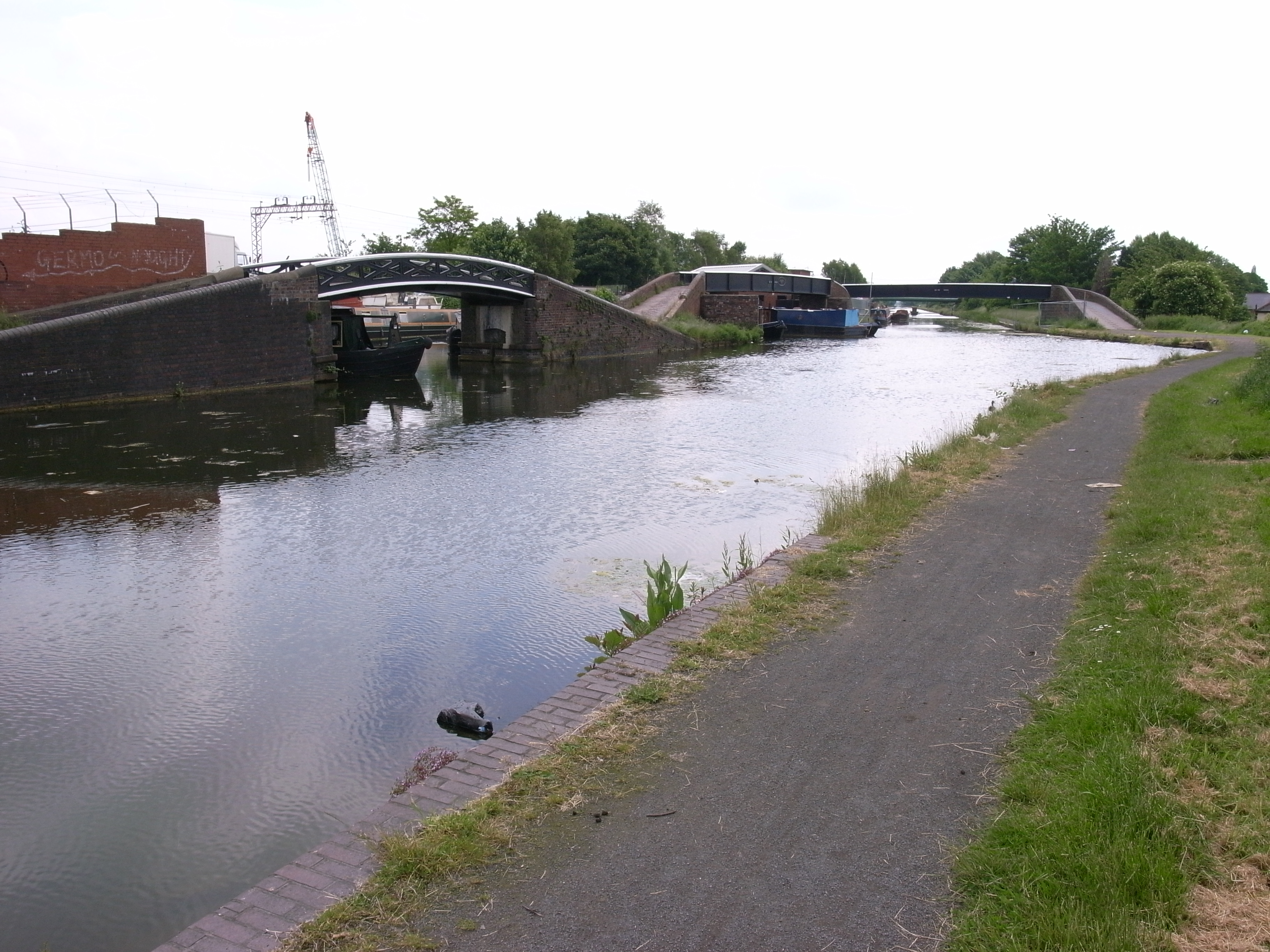
Watery Lane Junction and Caggy's Boatyard, near Toll End, Tipton.

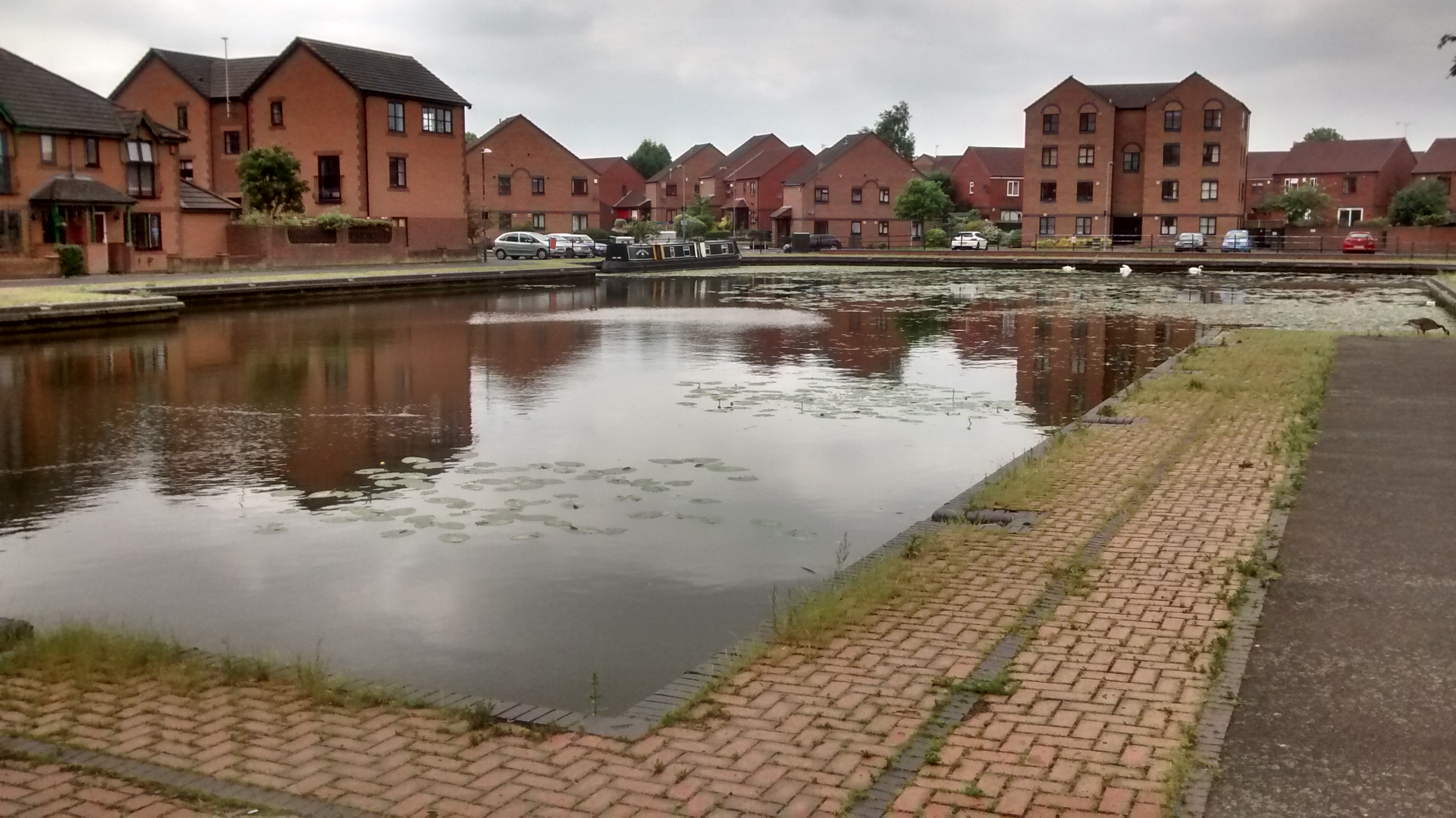
Tividale Quays Basin, Dudley Port, Tipton, on the Old Main Line

== See also ==
- Canals of the United Kingdom
- History of the British canal system
- Water levels of the Birmingham Canal Navigations
- Waterscape
