= Bromford Junction =

Coordinates: 52.5070°N 2.0051°W

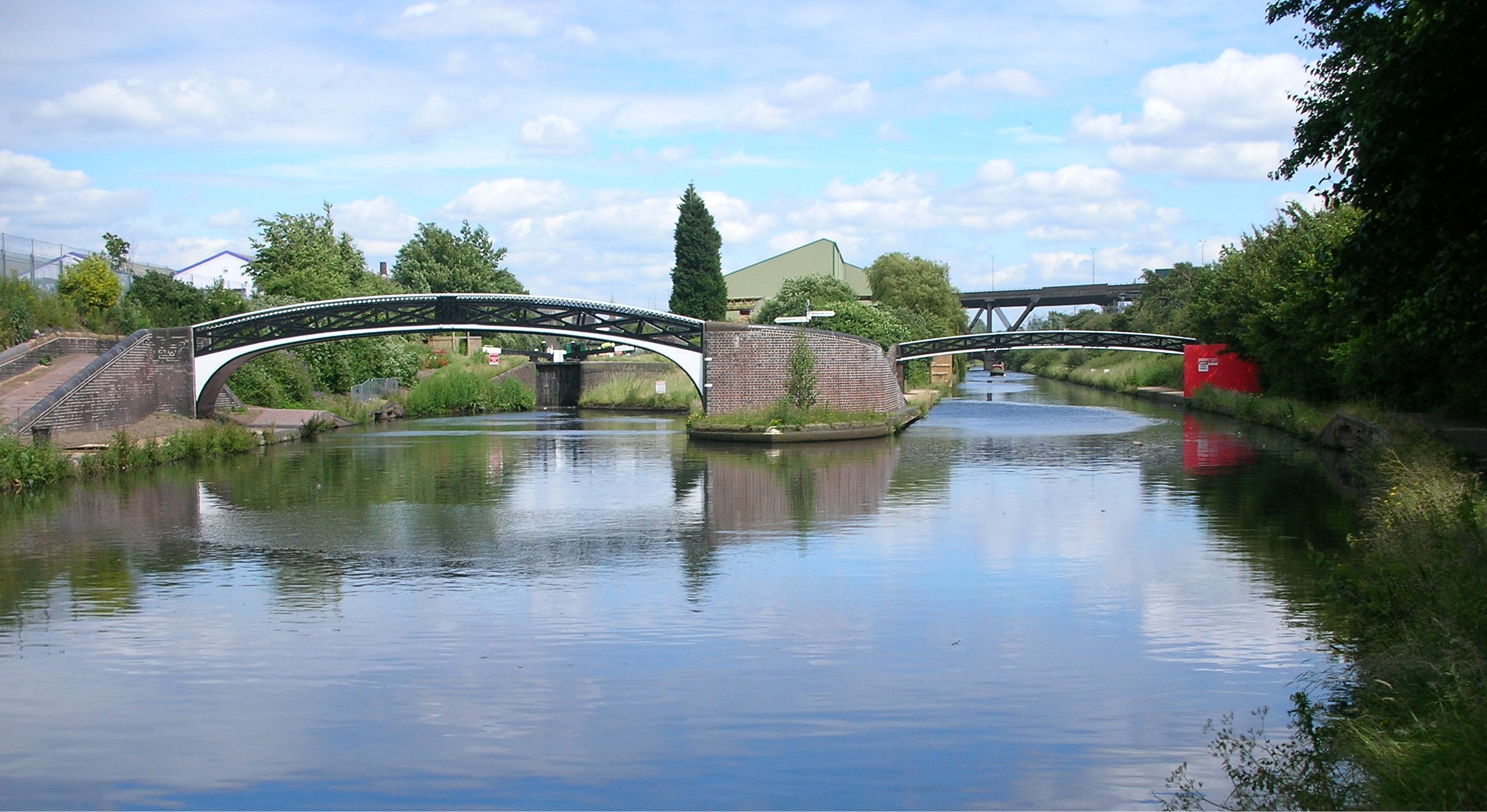
- Two Horseley Ironworks roving bridges at Bromford Junction. The line to Spon Lane Locks is to the left, and the new main line to the right.

Specifications
- Status: Open
- Navigation authority: British Waterways

History
- Date completed: 1829

Bromford Junction (grid reference SO996899) is a canal junction at the foot of the Spon Lane Locks where the Spon Lane Locks Branch meets the BCN New Main Line near Oldbury in the West Midlands, England.

== History ==
The location of the junction was originally on the Wednesbury Canal, a branch of the Birmingham Canal which had been authorised by Act of Parliament in 1768. Because there were collieries at Wednesbury, the branch and the section of the main line from it to Birmingham was opened first, in 1769, and a lucrative trade in coal developed. Between the junction site and Birmingham was a ridge of land, and the six Spon Lane Locks were situated to the east of the site, to raise the line from 453 feet (138 m) to the summit level of 491 feet (150 m). At Smethwick, another six locks dropped the canal to the same level, known as the Birmingham Level. The rest of the main line left Spon Lane Locks between the third and fourth lock, at the 473-foot (144 m) Wolverhampton Level, and maintained that level to Wolverhampton, where it dropped through twenty locks (later increased by one) to reach the Staffordshire and Worcestershire Canal at Autherley Junction. This section was completed in 1772.

The locks up and over the Smethwick summit caused problems with congestion and with water supply, and in the 1790s, a new cut was made at the Wolverhampton Level, which removed the need for three of the locks at both ends of the summit. This did not alleviate the problem entirely, and in 1825 the engineer Thomas Telford was commissioned to improve the main line. His canal, like others he built, cut across country in as straight a line as possible, using embankments, cuttings and tunnels where necessary to maintain a level. His new main line left the old one at Factory Locks, where three locks dropped the canal to the Birmingham Level, and followed a straight path to Pudding Green Junction, where it intersected the Wednesbury Canal. The old line of that canal between the intersection and Bromford Junction was widened and straightened, and became part of the main line, leaving a shortened Wednesbury Old Canal. To avoid the locks over Smethwick Summit, Telford built a huge cutting, up to 71 feet (22 m) deep in places, slightly to the south of the original line. The old line from the top of the remaining three locks at Spon Lane was carried over it at Stewart Aqueduct. Two junctions were created to maintain the connections, Bromford Junction at the west end of the cutting and Smethwick Junction at the east end. The bypass was opened on 18 December 1829, and when the new main line was completed, it reduced the length of James Brindley's winding contour canal by 7.5 miles (12.1 km) to 15 miles (24 km).

== Location ==
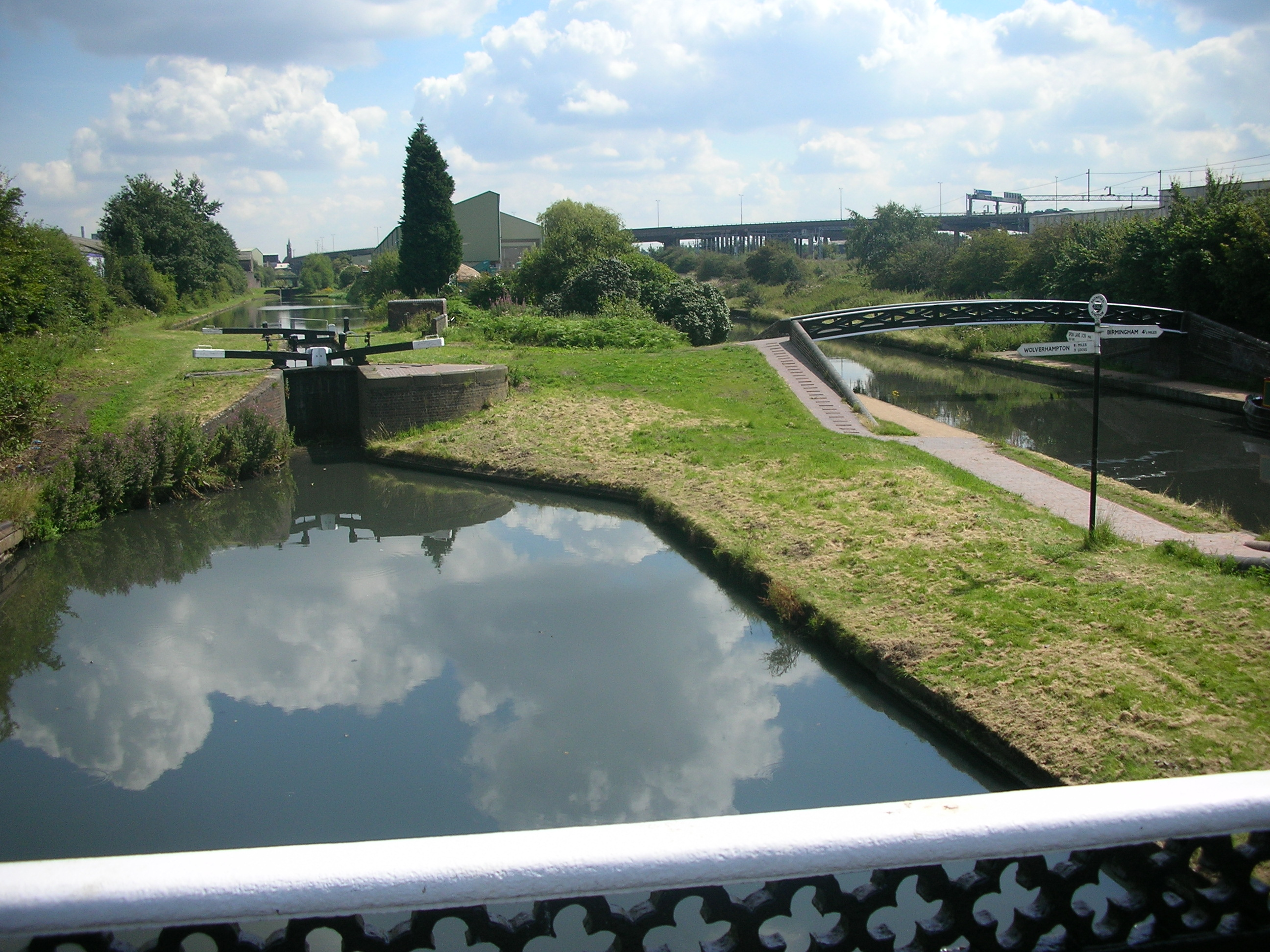
Spon Lane bottom lock, with the new main line to the right.

To the west, the canal is level for 3.3 miles (5.3 km) to the foot of Factory Locks, passing Pudding Green Junction and the Wednesbury Canal after 0.7 miles (1.1 km). To the east it is level to its terminus at Worcester Bar, a distance of 4.8 miles (7.7 km). The branch to Spon Lane Locks also heads east, running almost parallel to Telford's cut, and the bottom lock of the three is just a short distance along it.

There are two cast iron towpath bridges at the junction, both made at Horseley Ironworks in Tipton. The one over the Spon Lane Locks Branch has an elliptical arch, with abutments made of brick and sandstone dressings. Each side is made in two parts, which are bolted together. It carries the inscription "Horseley Iron Works 1829", and is a grade II listed structure. The bridge over the new main line is of similar design, but the lattice-work sides were manufactured in three sections, joined by bolts, the middle section of which carries the inscription "The Horseley Company Tipton 1848". The Spon Lane Locks are also grade II listed.

== See also ==
- List of canal junctions in Great Britain
- List of canal aqueducts in Great Britain
- List of canal basins in Great Britain
- List of canal locks in Great Britain
- List of canal tunnels in Great Britain

== Bibliography ==
- Cumberlidge, Jane (2009). Inland Waterways of Great Britain (8th Ed.). Imray Laurie Norie and Wilson. ISBN 978-1-84623-010-3.
- Hadfield, Charles (1985). The Canals of the West Midlands. David and Charles. ISBN 0-7153-8644-1.
- Nicholson (2003). Nicholson Waterways Guide (Vol 3): Birmingham and the heart of England. Harper Collins. ISBN 0-00-713666-8.
- Pearson, Michael (1989). Canal Companion - Birmingham Canal Navigations. J. M. Pearson & Associates. ISBN 0-907864-49-X.
