= Stewart Aqueduct =

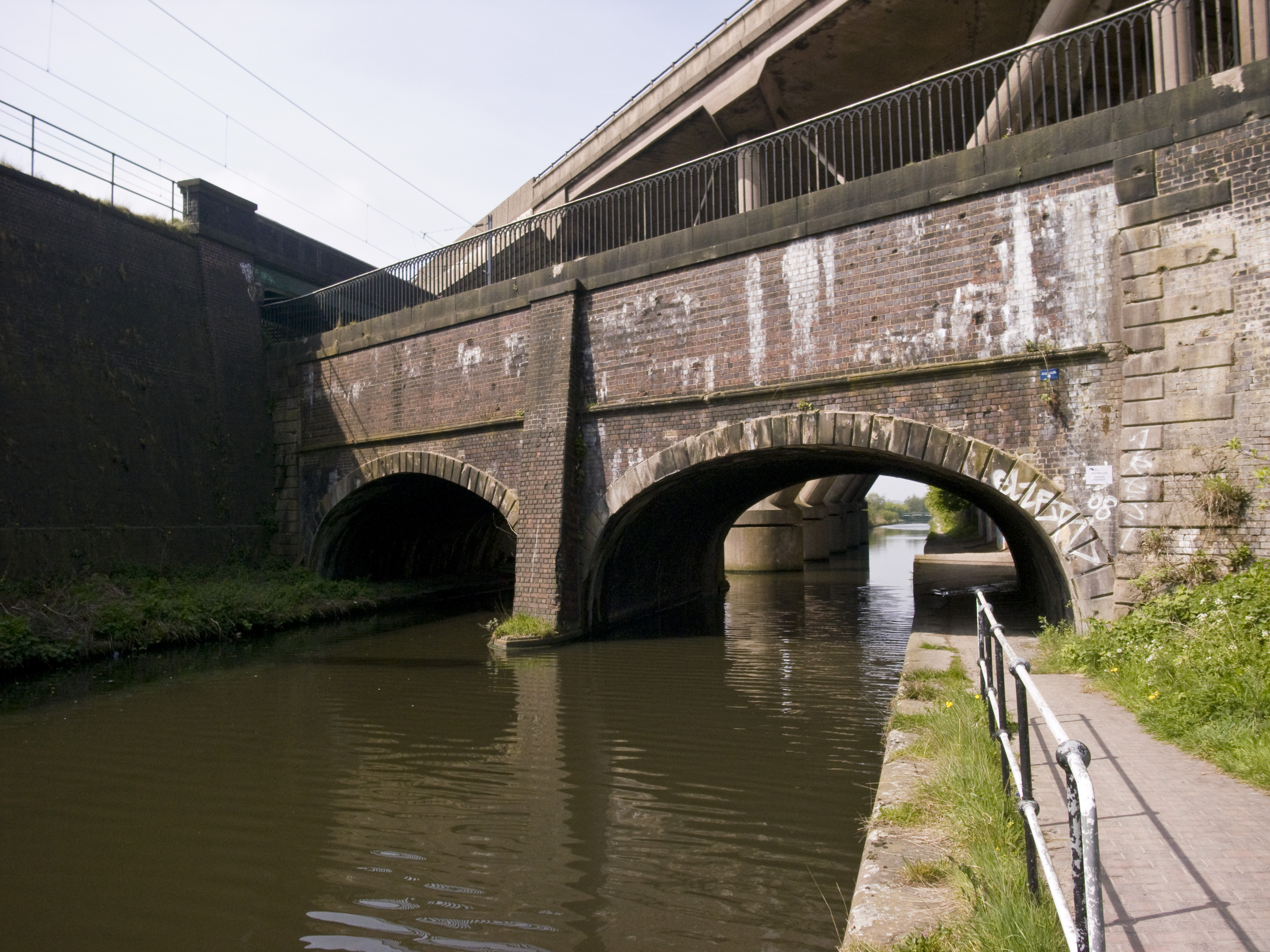
- The Stewart (or Steward) Aqueduct
- Coordinates: 52.5059°N 1.9974°W
- OS grid reference: SP001898
- Carries: BCN Old Main Line
- Crosses: BCN New Main Line
- Locale: Smethwick
- Maintained by: Canal & River Trust
- Heritage status: Grade II listed

Characteristics
- Trough construction: Brick
- Pier construction: Brick
- Traversable?: Yes
- Towpaths: Both
- No. of spans: Two
- Piers in water: One

History
- Designer: Thomas Telford
- Construction end: 1828

The Stewart Aqueduct (or Steward Aqueduct) in Smethwick, West Midlands (but formerly in Staffordshire), England carries the BCN Old Main Line Canal (1770) over the BCN New Main Line Canal (1828). Alongside and above the New Main Line Canal is the Stour Valley section of the West Coast Main Line (1852), all three being bridged by the M5 motorway (c. 1970).

The Grade II listed aqueduct was built by Thomas Telford in 1829 when he bypassed James Brindley's earlier Birmingham Canal (at the Wolverhampton Level) with his New Main Line (at the Birmingham Level). Both canals contributed to the Industrial Revolution in the Midlands by conveying coal and raw materials to Birmingham, and finished products to the country and ports.

It is located at the edge of the former Chance's Glass Works (1824) and is close to Spon Lane Canal Junction, the point where the Wednesbury and Wolverhampton routes of the BCN Old Main Line (former Birmingham Canal) meet.

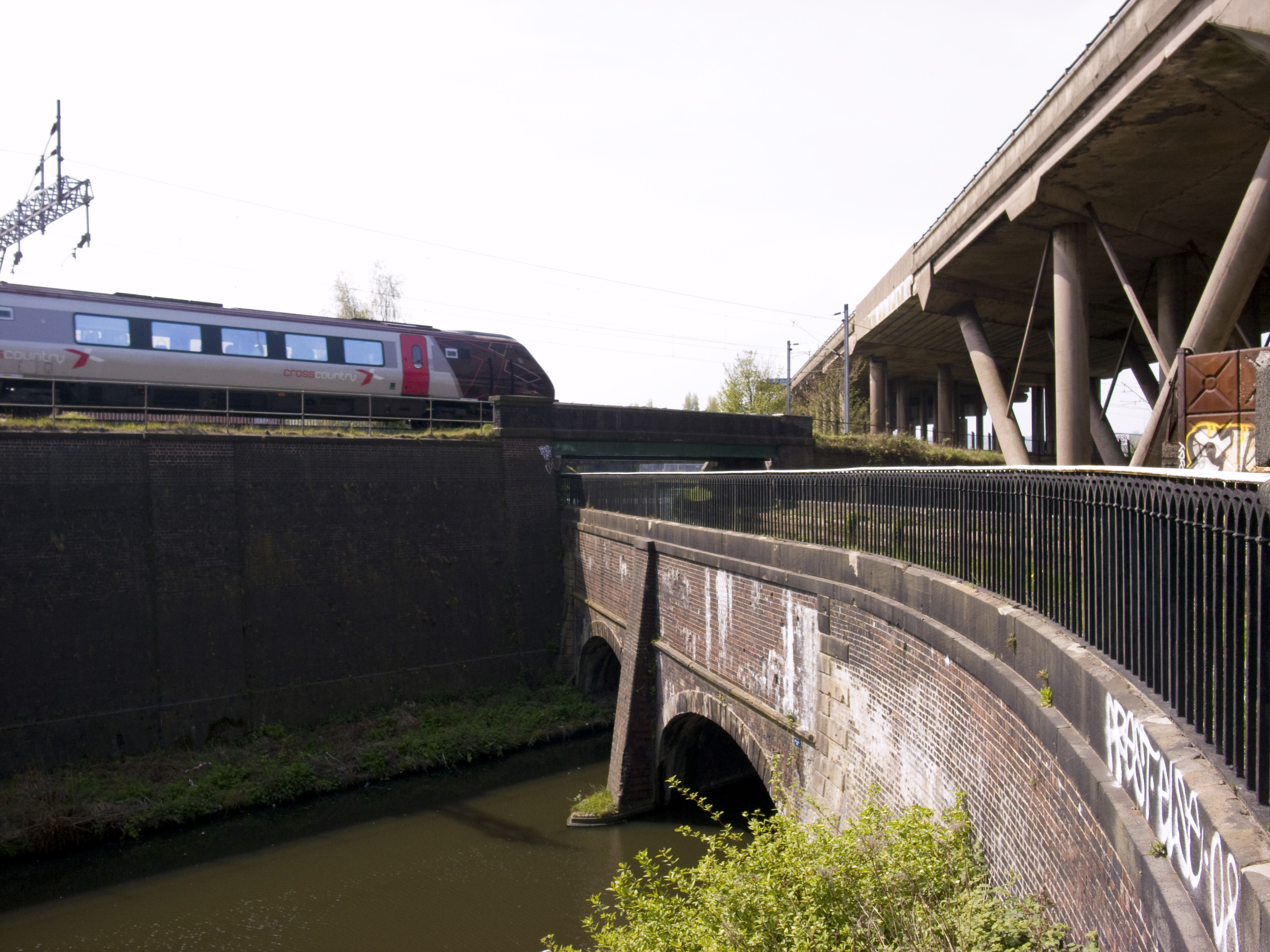
Motorway (M5) over railway over canal over canal

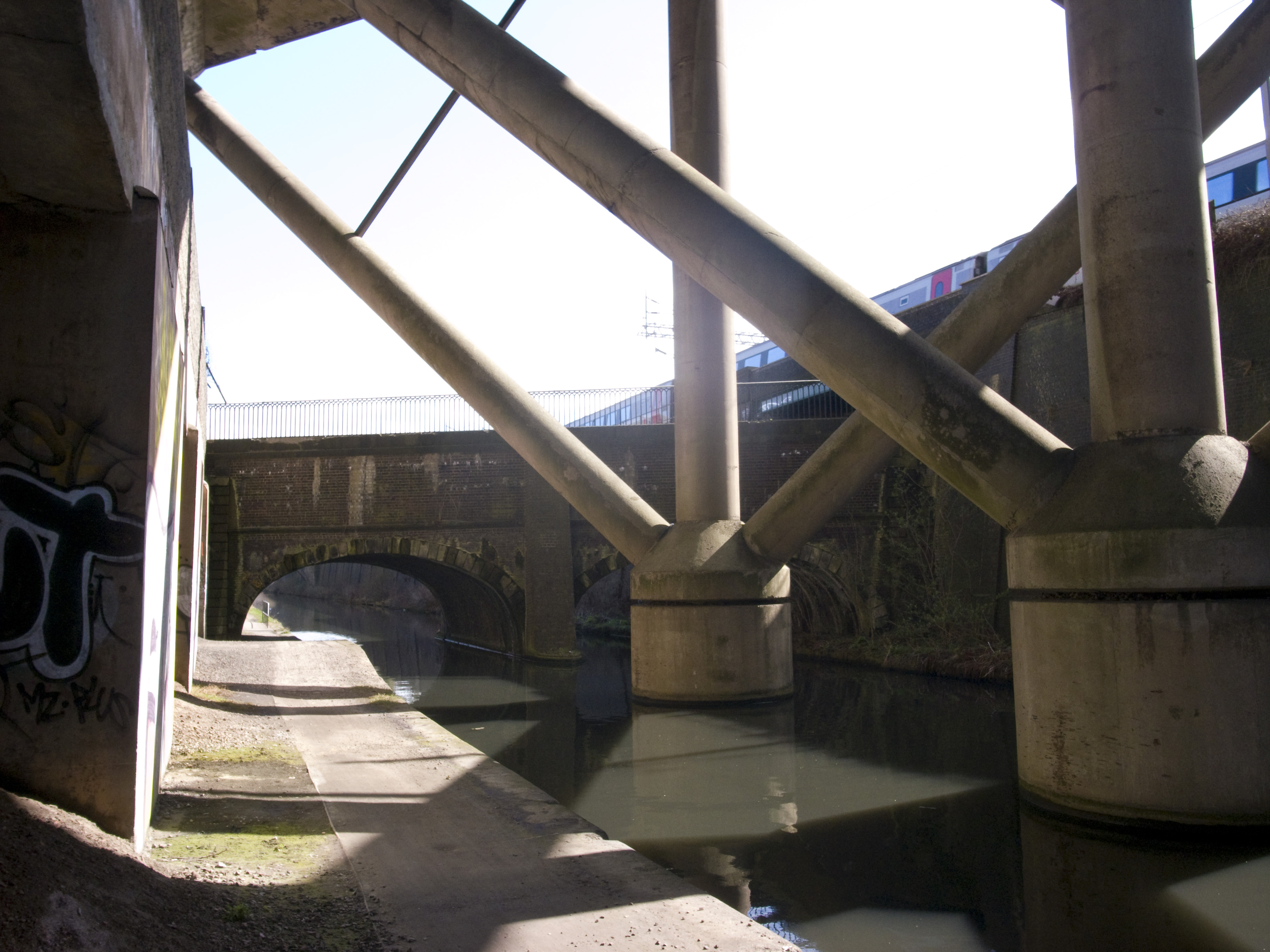
The aqueduct behind struts of motorway looking towards Birmingham
