= Water-returning engine =

Early steam engine

A water-returning engine was an early form of stationary steam engine, developed at the start of the Industrial Revolution in the middle of the 18th century. The first beam engines did not generate power by rotating a shaft but were developed as water pumps, mostly for draining mines. The main source of power to drive machinery in factories and furnaces was the Water wheel, and by using one of these 'returning engines' to return water from beneath a water wheel to above it the waterwheel could work with optimal flow at all times.

The steam engine was not, as widely held, the cause of the Industrial Revolution, but rather arose as a result of it. The primary power source of the Revolution, certainly in the 18th century, was the water wheel, not the steam engine.

== The need for an independent prime-mover ==
=== Blowing engines ===
The origins of the water-returning engine begin with blowing engines used to provide the draught for blast furnaces and smelters. Although early furnaces may have been powered by human- or animal-powered bellows, (Note: Smelters could even be blown by the directly water-powered trompe.) once the Industrial Revolution began the new enlarged furnaces were blown by water wheel-powered blowing houses.

Smelters are most economically located near the source of their ore, which may not have suitable water power available nearby. There is also the risk of drought interrupting the water supply, or of expanding demand for the furnace outstripping the available water capacity. In 1754 one furnace in the Weald was so drought-stricken that its manager considered hiring workmen to turn the wheel as a treadmill.

=== Rolling mills ===
As well as an inability to work in periods of drought, the amount of water available could also vary the power of machinery powered by it. The amount and type of work to be carried out by heavy industries could be influenced by the seasonal availability of water. In 1785 Kirkstall Forge near Leeds wrote to a customer, 'It will be convenient for us just now to roll a few tons because we have a full supply of water—and we cannot manufacture thin plate so well when our water is short.'

This variation in water wheel power according to the water available also led to developments in water wheel design, Rennie's venetian-blind 'hatch' allowed a controlled water flow, whatever the depth of the mill leat, and unlike a simple sluice could always offer the greatest head possible.

Problems of water supply would affect ironmasters for some time to come. In the 1830s, the young Alfred Krupp was still beset by problems with water shortage in the Berne brook, driving the hammers of his Gusstahlfabrik. Owing to a lack of finance, it was not until 1836 that Alfred was able to build a steam hammer, independent of this water supply.

== Water-returning engines ==
These restrictions led to the very earliest form of steam engine used for power generation rather than pumping, the water-returning engine. With this engine, a steam pump was used to raise water that in turn drove a water wheel and thus the machinery. Water from the wheel was then returned by the pump. These early steam engines were only suitable for pumping water, and could not be connected directly to the machinery. They consumed considerable coal, but had the benefit that they did not need to be used when the water supply was sufficient.

The first practical examples of these engines were installed in 1742 at Coalbrookdale, at Nehemiah Champion's brass works at Warmley in 1749 and as improvements to the Carron Ironworks on the Clyde in 1765. Richard Ford at Coalbrookdale first tried using horse pumps in 1735. The first engines were atmospheric beam engines to either Newcomen, Smeaton or Watt's systems. A cylinder was provided on opposite sides of the beam, one as the working cylinder supplied with steam and the other as the pumping cylinder. The engines were single-acting, the power stroke being downwards at the power cylinder, and the pump being a simple upward-acting bucket pump. The Watt engines were of Watt's early single-acting atmospheric designs. By the time of his later thermodynamic improvements, he had also developed his sun and planet gear and could offer engines that rotated directly. A large single-acting engine, Resolution, was built at Coalbrookdale and by the time it was delivered in 1782, it had already been obsoleted by these further developments. Despite this, the engine worked successfully for almost forty years.

As well as blowing furnaces, the rotary output of the water wheel was also used to drive mills and factory equipment, by use of lineshafts. By the middle of the eighteenth century, Mantoux describes them as "being everywhere". In 1765 Matthew Boulton considered using a Savery engine to power the waterwheel of his Soho Manufactory. He went so far as to build a model of this engine and sought the advice of both Benjamin Franklin and Erasmus Darwin on the subject. By 1768 though, the promise of Watt's beam engine convinced him to wait, even though it would be several years until Watt's Kinneil engine was brought South and rebuilt at Soho. In 1777 Boulton and Watt built a new engine, Old Bess, for their use. The engine still survives in the Science Museum.

Water-returning engines were superseded by the rotative beam engine, that could power rotating machinery directly.

== See also ==
- Steam power during the Industrial Revolution
