= Old Bess (beam engine) =

1777 steam engine

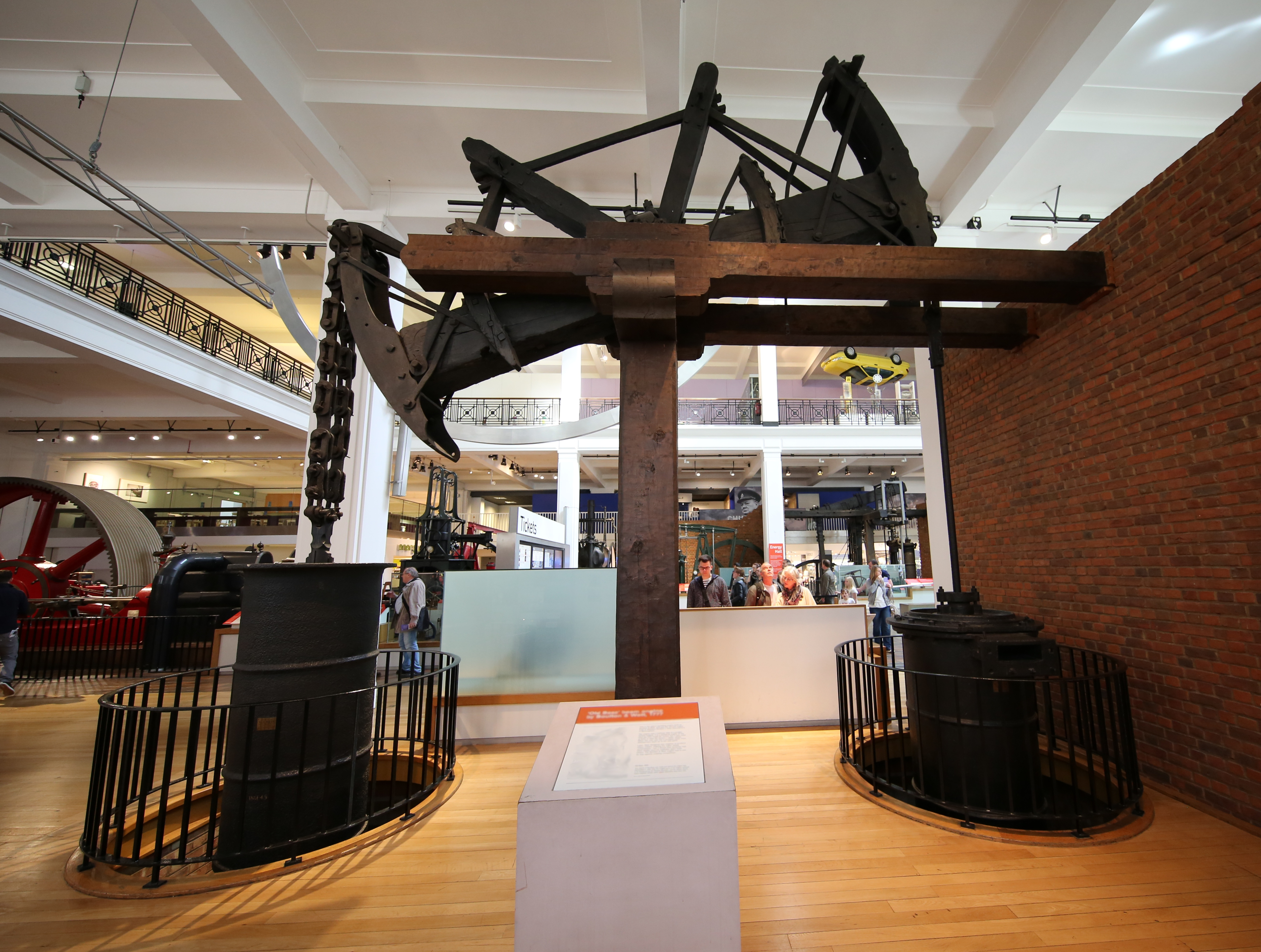
- Old Bess, as now preserved in the Science Museum, London

Origins
- Type: Watt beam engine
- Designer: James Watt
- Maker: Boulton and Watt
- Date: 1777
- Country of origin: England
- Former operator: Soho Manufactory
- Purpose: Water-returning engine driving factory machinery

Measurements
- Cylinders: 1
- Bore: 33 inches (838 mm)

Preservation
- Collection: Science Museum Group
- Location: Science Museum, London
- Working: No

Old Bess is an early beam engine built by the partnership of Boulton and Watt. The engine was constructed in 1777 and worked until 1848.

The engine is most obviously known simply for being an early example of an engine built by Boulton and Watt. However it also played a far more important role in the development of steam engines for being the first engine designed to work with an early cutoff, and so to use the expansion of the steam for greater efficiency.

It is now preserved in the Power Gallery of the Science Museum, London. It is the oldest surviving Watt engine, and the third-oldest surviving beam engine. (Note: Two older Newcomen engines survive, the Newcomen Memorial Engine at Dartmouth and Fairbottom Bobs in the Henry Ford Museum.)

== Watt's previous Kinneil Engine ==
Watt's first engine at Kinneil in Scotland had been unsuccessful, and the parts were taken down and re-used at Boulton's Soho Manufactory in Birmingham. The reworked engine was more successful there, and encouraged Boulton to invest further in this developing steam technology and in Watt's inventions.

The Manufactory had been built to use a water wheel to drive its machinery, and the site had been chosen on that basis, but there were concerns over seasonal lack of water to power the wheel. Similar problems in the iron industry had inspired the development of the water-returning engine: a steam pump that could raise water to drive the wheel, in times of low water on the river. The Kinneil Engine had been built as a pump, for use in a coal mine, and so was suitable for this new task. Watt's rotative beam engine had not yet been considered and so the only way to produce rotary work to drive machinery in the Manufactory was by water power.

In 1777 Boulton and Watt decided to build a second engine for use at Soho, either to supplement the Kinneil Engine or primarily to experiment with Watt's new idea of expansive working of the steam. The new engine was also to be a water-returning engine Like the earlier Newcomen engines, it was only capable of pumping water rather than driving machinery directly.

== Working life ==
=== Construction ===
As early as 1769, Watt was considering the possibility of working steam expansively, as recorded in a letter of 28 May to Dr. Small. Early engines were incapable of this, as they used a single valve for both inlet and exhaust. As Watt had already begun to use separate valves for each function, it would now be possible to control their timing independently, i.e. to apply lead to the timing of the inlet valve. Watt decided to construct a new engine to demonstrate this principle and was confident of the substantial savings in coal consumption to be offered.

Construction began in 1777 with the ordering of a 33-inch (Note: Engines were characterised by and often named after the diameter of their cylinder. This dimension (amongst other factors) determined their power output; whilst the working pressure and precise piston stroke length could be altered, the cylinder was fixed at manufacture.) cylinder (84 cm). The engine was erected and working at Soho by August, although still incomplete.

The engine always worked as a water pump and was equipped with two cast iron cylinders at opposite ends of the beam, one for the working cylinder and one for the pump. The pump cylinder was taller and thinner, of 24 inches (61 cm) diameter and 8 feet 3 inches (2.5 m) tall, designed for a working stroke 7 feet (2.1 m) within this, although only 6 feet 1 inch (1.9 m) was used in practice. The pumped water was delivered at a head of 24 feet (7.3 m). The engine was later described as being of 30 hp in power.

The beam was typical for early single-acting beam engines, pulling through wrought iron chains running over a curved arch-head at each end of the beam. At some later point, possibly when reconstructed after the fire, this beam was strengthened by being strutted and bridled with the additional timber and iron triangular trusses that are seen above the beam today.

=== Beelzebub ===
Initial operation of the engine was unsatisfactory. Watt was away in Cornwall and Boulton wrote to him, describing the engine's actions as "very fierce". His opinion was that the engine's cylinder was too large for the work expected of it. This led to it being worked at a pressure of around 5.7 psi, whereas if it were operating at 8 psi, it would be less jerky and violent. This action was so remarkable as to give the engine its initial nickname of Beelzebub.

Neither Watt nor Boulton had a solution to the engine's behaviour. Watt's experience with the Chacewater engine, a rebuilt Smeaton engine, at Wheal Busy, suggested that cutoff led to a violent action. In September he recommended throttling the steam supply to the engine. Boulton favoured further experimentation with cutoff (i.e. valve timing) and in 1779 suggested that a series of more scientific measurements be tried. With hindsight, Boulton's approach was the more thermodynamically efficient, although this lesson was not fully appreciated by locomotive drivers right to the end of steam power.

=== Fire and reconstruction ===
One morning in July 1778 the engine house was discovered to be on fire. The fire spread rapidly and within half an hour the roof was burned to the ground. The timberwork and soldered copper piping of the engine were also destroyed or damaged. Even the beam itself, a substantial timber construction, was "rendered unfit" by the fire. Fortunately the most important part of the engine, its cylinder, survived the fire relatively intact. Within three weeks the engine had been reconstructed and was expected to be working again shortly.

While the engine had been damaged, Watt, who was once again away in Cornwall, had advised that "no repair farther that the roof ought to be gone about at present", with his intention being to reconstruct the engine in some improved manner. The nature of these reconstructions, and their effectiveness, remains unclear.

By 1781, the engine had been working in its reconstructed form for some years. Whatever the improvements had been, they left Watt and Boulton still agreeing that this was, "one of the worst engines they had".

== Closure of the Mint and preservation ==
The engine operated at the Soho Mint in Handsworth, West Midlands, until the mint's closure in 1848. It was sold for £48, then re-sold for £58 and placed on display on an island in Derrington Pool, outside the metal-rolling works of its new owner, a Mr. Walker. Although much of the Mint's coining machinery had been re-sold for further use at the new Birmingham Mint, this aged and thoroughly obsolete engine appears to have been one of the first artefacts of industrial archaeology to be deliberately preserved.

The engine was later re-sold and then presented to the Commissioners of Patents for their Patent Office Museum, which would in turn become the Science Museum in London. The engine is thus not only one of the museum's oldest exhibits, but also one of the first to enter its collection. When first displayed, the engine was erected in an open-fronted representation of a brick-built engine house. It is now displayed on free-standing timberwork, allowing a closer inspection of the cylinders.

For an engine that had been described as "one of the worst engines they had" when almost new, it had a relatively long working life of over 70 years. Its name had also shifted from the violent Beelzebub to the rather more friendly Old Bess, indicating a more satisfactory performance. Reports by both Joseph Harrison, Artificer of the Soho Mint and William Buckle support this.

In 2009 it was awarded an Engineering Heritage Award by the IMechE.

== Confusion between engines ==
Several confusions exist about this engine, and have been widely repeated.

The first of these confusions is that this was Watt's second engine (after the Kinneil engine) and the first by the Boulton and Watt partnership. In fact several engines were built between 1773 (the return of the Kinneil engine to Birmingham) and the construction of Beelzebub in 1777. These include such well-known engines as the 1775 38-inch blowing engine for John Wilkinson's blast furnaces at New Willey, near Broseley in Shropshire, and the 50-inch pumping engine for Bloomfield Colliery near Tipton in the West Midlands.

The identity of Beelzebub is also confused. Some sources describe this as referring to the rebuilt Kinneil engine at Birmingham. There are two pieces of evidence to support the view that Old Bess and Beelzebub are the same engine. Firstly the name Beelzebub derives from its violent action when used experimentally for expansive working, an experiment applied to the engine built new in 1777. Secondly Beelzebub is described as a 33-inch engine, as is Old Bess on display today. There is no record of Boulton & Watt ever building another engine of this dimension.

== See also ==
- Smethwick Engine – the oldest working Watt steam engine
