= Smethwick Engine =

Watt steam engine

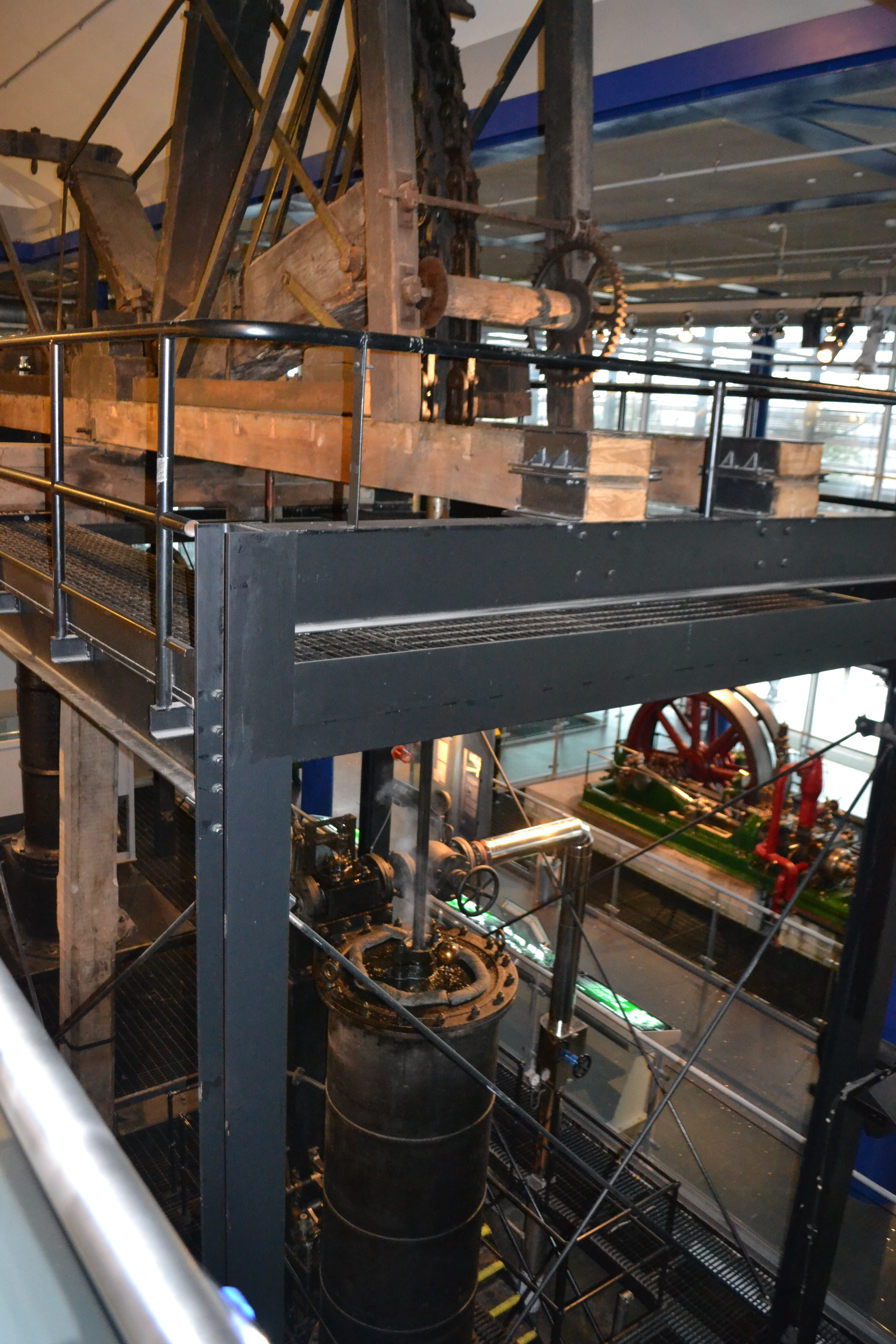
- The engine in steam at Birmingham's Thinktank museum

Origins
- Type: Watt beam engine
- Designer: James Watt
- Maker: Boulton and Watt
- Date: May 1779
- Country of origin: England
- Former operator: Birmingham Canal Navigations
- Purpose: Pumping water

Measurements
- Cylinders: 1
- Bore: 32 inches (81 cm)
- Stroke: 8 feet (244 cm)

Preservation
- Collection: Birmingham Museums Trust
- Location: Thinktank
- Working: Yes

The Smethwick Engine is a Watt steam engine made by Boulton and Watt, which was installed near Birmingham, England, and was brought into service in May 1779. Now at Thinktank, Birmingham Science Museum, it is the oldest working steam engine and the oldest working engine in the world.

== History ==
Originally, it was one of two steam engines used to pump water back up to the 491-foot (149.7 m) summit level of the BCN Old Main Line (Birmingham Canal) canal at Smethwick, not far from the Soho Foundry where it was made. The other engine, also built by Boulton and Watt, was at the other end of the summit level at Spon Lane. In 1804 a second Boulton and Watt engine was added alongside the 1779 engine.

The engines were needed because local water sources were insufficient to supply water to operate the six locks either side of the canal's original summit. The locks could have been avoided if a tunnel had been built, but the ground was too unstable for James Brindley to build a tunnel using the techniques available at the time. In the 1780s, a cutting was constructed by John Smeaton, enabling three of the six locks on each side to be removed.

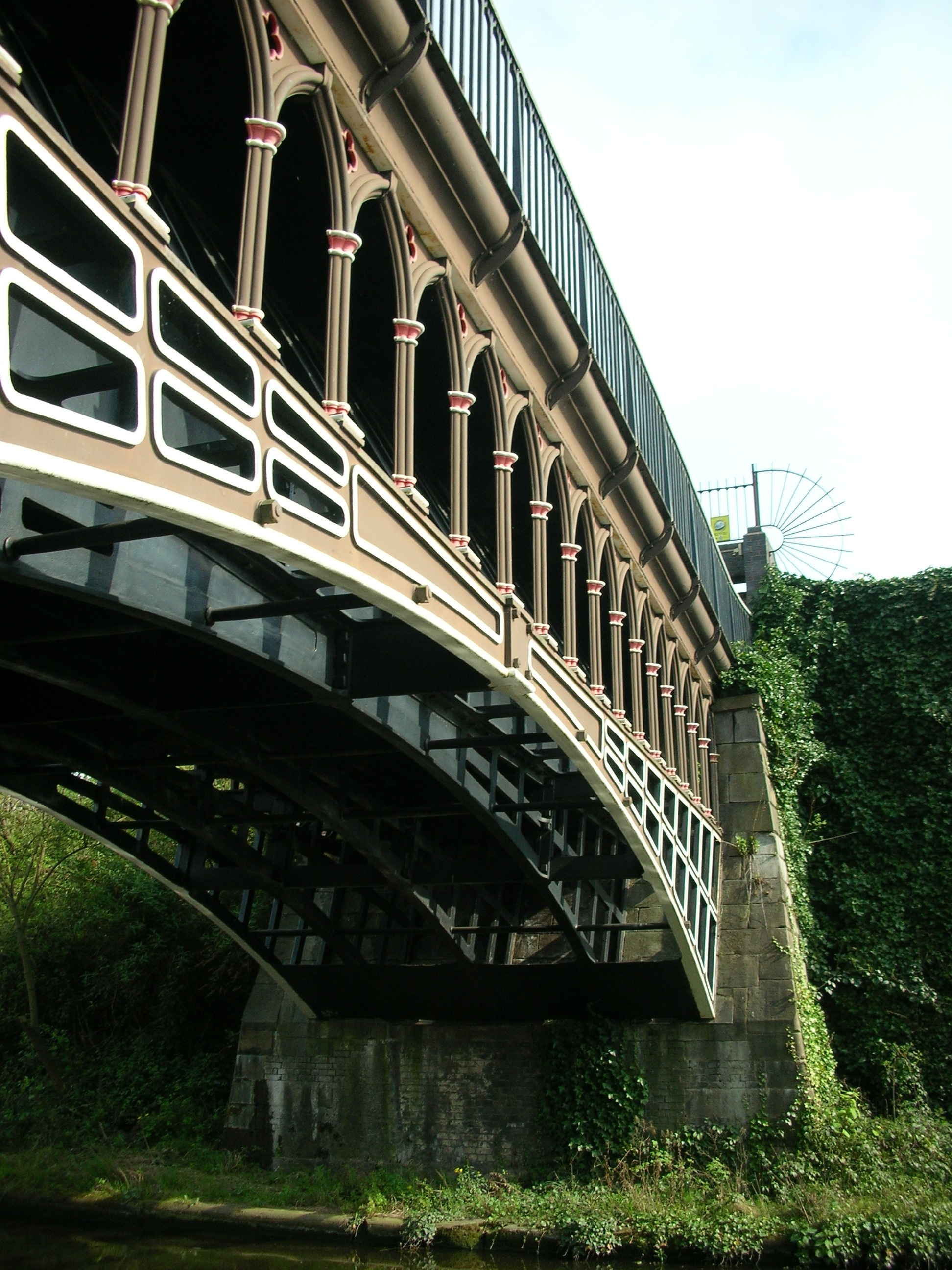
The Engine Arm Aqueduct

In the 1820s, Thomas Telford constructed a new canal parallel to the old in a deeper cutting, at the 453 ft (138.1 m) Birmingham Level, creating the largest man-made earthworks in the world at the time. It was spanned by the Galton Bridge. The engine was still needed, despite both these developments, and Thomas Telford constructed the Engine Arm Aqueduct carrying the Engine Arm branch canal over his New Main Line so that coal could still be transported along the arm to feed the Smethwick Engine.

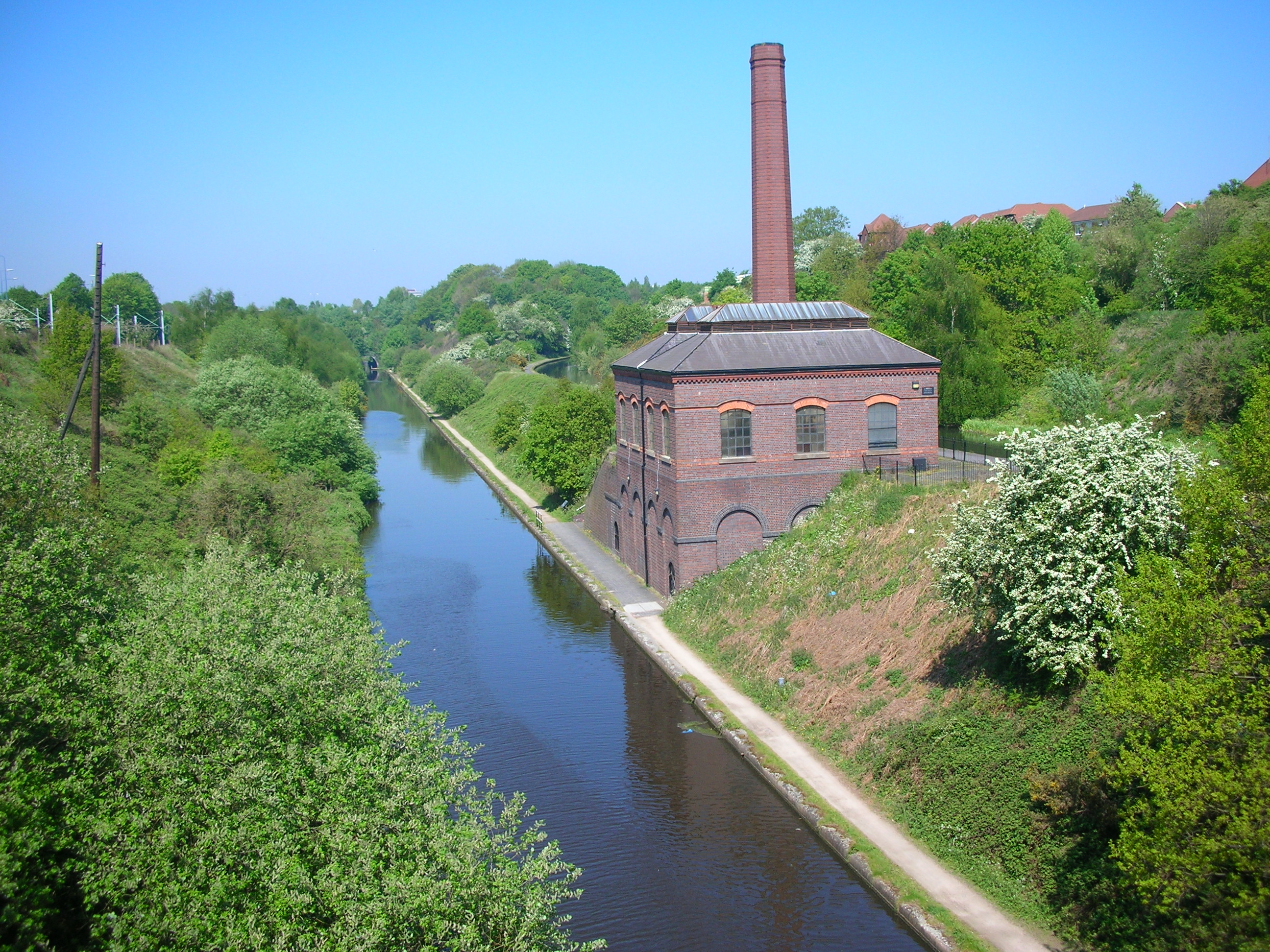
New Smethwick Pumping Station

In 1892, a replacement engine was built in a new pumping house, now Grade II listed, next to Brasshouse Lane, as the original Smethwick Engine was considered uneconomic to repair; the latter was removed for preservation in 1897–98 to the BCN, later British Waterways, Ocker Hill depot where it remained until acquired by Birmingham City Council. It is now part of the collection of Birmingham Museums and is on display at Thinktank, Birmingham Science Museum at Millennium Point. It is the oldest working engine in the world.

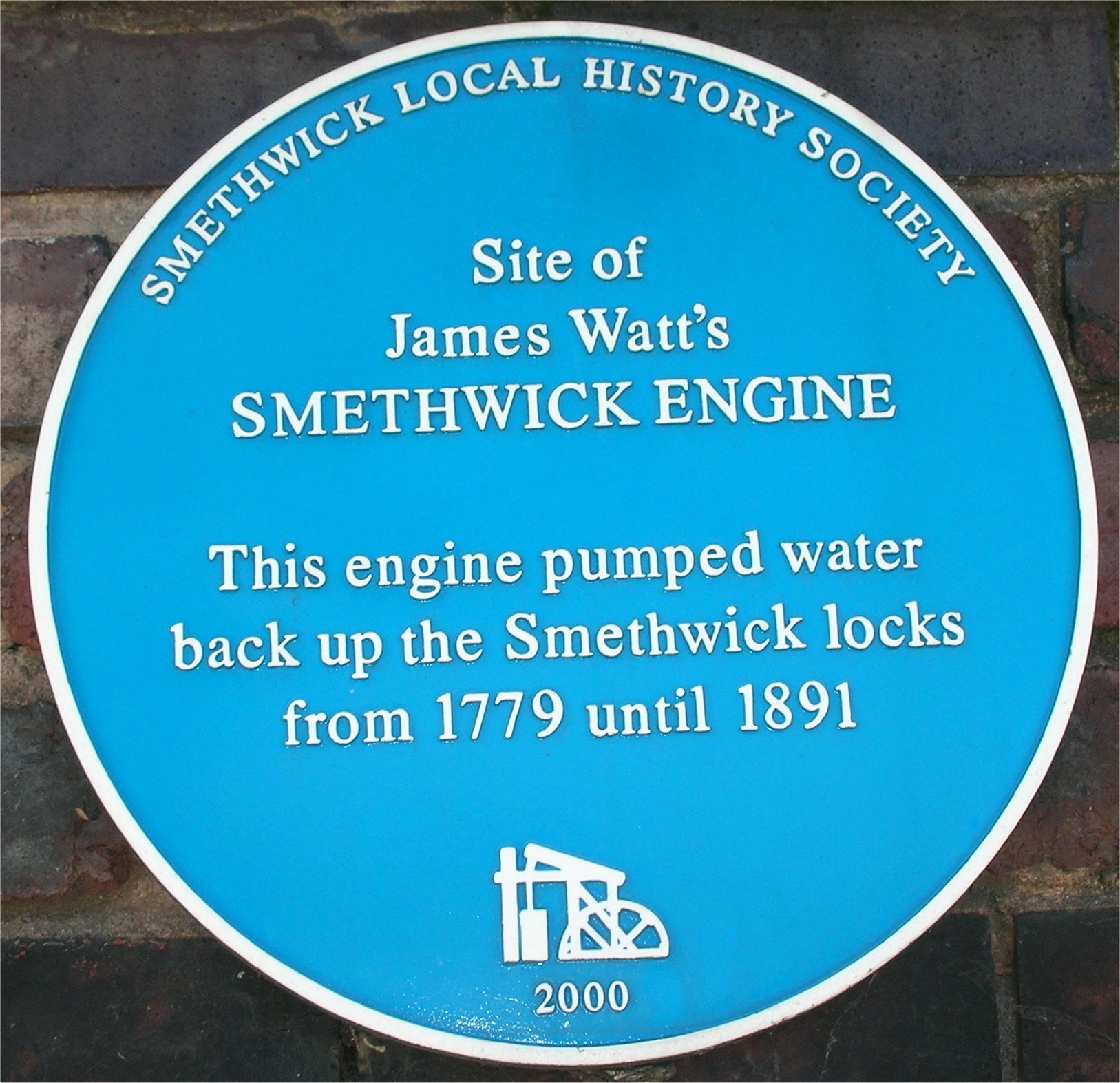
Blue plaque at the site of the Smethwick Engine

The engine house was demolished in 1897. Its original site and foundations can still be seen on Bridge Street North in Smethwick, just north of the junction with Rolfe Street. Tours of the site can be arranged through the Galton Valley Canal Heritage Centre which is based in the New Smethwick Pumping Station and regularly opened by Sandwell Museum Service and The Friends of Galton Valley.

The pumping station was featured in an episode of The Water Boatman presented by Alan Herd on the Discovery Shed TV channel in November 2011.

== Points of interest ==
Point	Coordinates (Links to map resources)	OS Grid Ref	Notes
Smethwick Engine original pumphouse	52.4977°N 1.9622°W	SP025889	Bridge Street North, Smethwick
Engine Arm Aqueduct	52.4979°N 1.9665°W	SP022889	
New Smethwick Pumphouse	52.4981°N 1.9731°W	SP018889	Brasshouse Lane, Smethwick

== See also ==
- Canals of the United Kingdom
- History of the British canal system
- Old Bess (beam engine) – the oldest surviving Watt steam engine
