= Engine Arm =

Historic English industrial canal

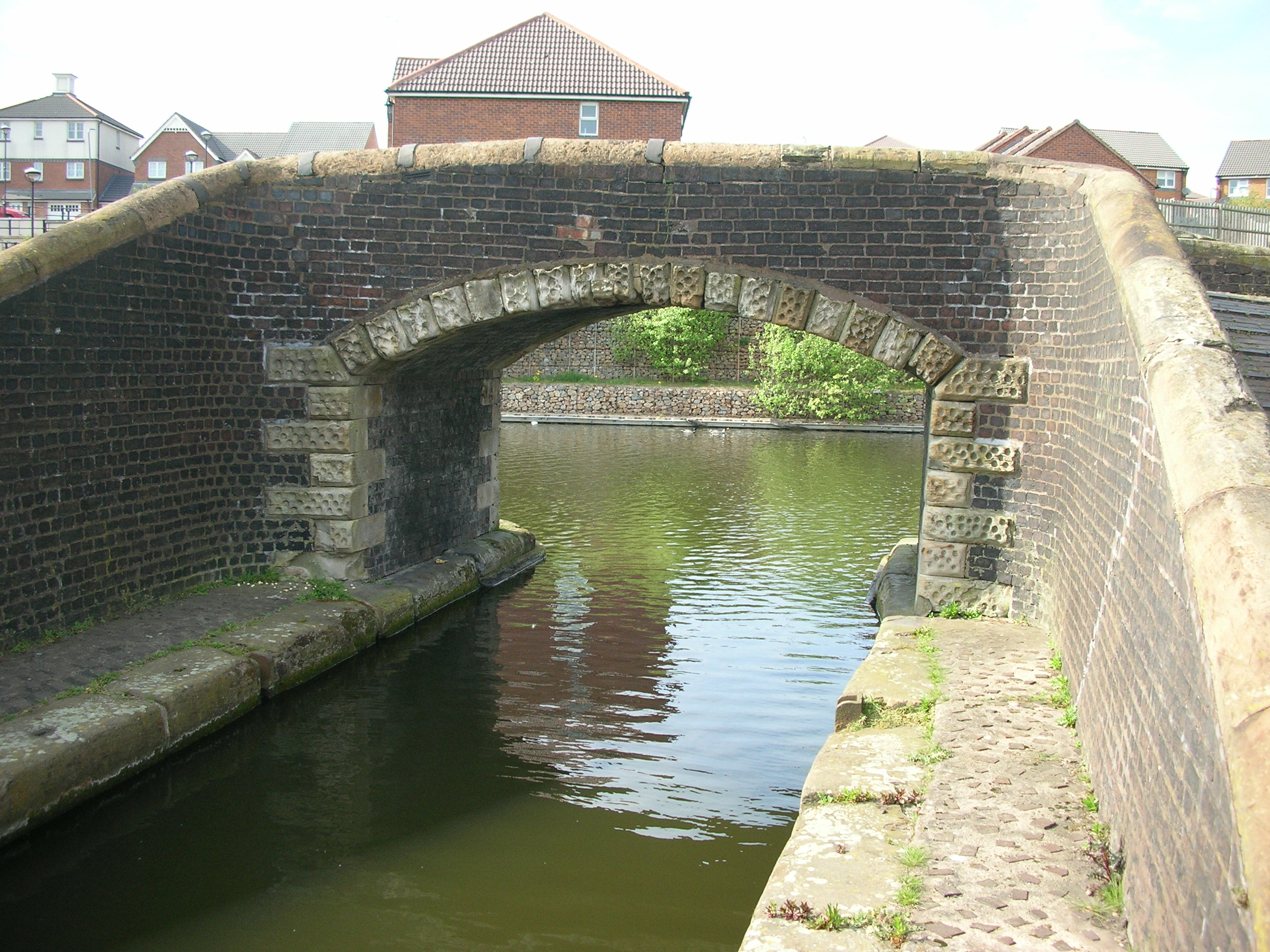
- The roving bridge at the junction with the Old Main Line

Specifications
- Length: 0.5 miles (0.80 km)
- Maximum height above sea level: 473 ft (144 m)
- Status: Navigable
- Navigation authority: Canal and River Trust

History
- Principal engineer: BCN engineers
- Other engineer(s): Thomas Telford
- Date of first use: 1790

Geography
- Branch of: Birmingham Canal Navigations
- Connects to: Old Main Line

The Engine Arm or Birmingham Feeder Arm near Smethwick, West Midlands, England, is a short canal which was originally part of a feeder tunnel for a pumping engine. When the Smethwick flight of locks were reduced from six to three, the pumping engine was moved to a new site, which allowed part of the feeder tunnel to be opened up and made navigable, so that coal supplies for the engine could be delivered by barge. The Engine Arm also supplied the pumped water to the 473-foot (144 m) Wolverhampton level of the lowered summit. The arm was extended between 1825 and 1830 by Thomas Telford to carry water from Rotton Park Reservoir (now called Edgbaston Reservoir) to the Old Main Line of the BCN Main Line Canal, and the Engine Arm Aqueduct was inserted to carry it over the new main line constructed at that time, which was 20 feet (6.1 m) lower. The arm is now managed by the Canal and River Trust and the basin beyond the site of the pumping station, which was replaced by a new engine house near Brasshouse Lane bridge in 1892, is used for residential moorings.

== History ==
When the Birmingham Canal was authorised by the Birmingham Canal Navigation Act 1768 (8 Geo. 3. c. 38) in February 1768, the engineer James Brindley had expected to be able to tunnel through a ridge of higher ground near Smethwick. However, trial borings to assess the nature of the ridge revealed running sand and other material quite unsuitable for tunnelling through, so Brindley recommended that they go over the top of the ridge, with locks at both ends and fire engines to pump the water up to the summit level, because of the lack of local water sources. This was achieved by building the Smethwick flight of six locks at the eastern end and the corresponding Spon Lane flight of six locks at the western end. The canal opened on 25 March 1772. Negotiations with Boulton and Watt began in August 1776, and the Spon Lane engine was installed by them and operational by April 1778, pumping reclaimed water back up to the summit level. Because of its success, a second engine was ordered for the Smethwick end. This was erected 0.75 miles (1.2 km) from the summit pound. It drew water from the bottom of the flight through a feeder tunnel, and another feeder tunnel delivered the pumped water to the upper level.

The summit was only about 1,000 yards (910 m) long, and resulted in considerable delays as traffic levels increased. In 1786, the company decided to lower the level of the summit to the Wolverhampton Level of 473 feet (144 m), and contacted John Smeaton to act as engineer, but he does not seem to have played an active part in the actual work which was carried out by the company's engineers. The redundant top three locks of each flight were filled in, although three new locks, running parallel to the originals, were constructed at the Smethwick end. The Spon Lane engine also became redundant, and although the company considered moving it to supply the locks at Toll End and Bradley Hall, they sold it to the Dudley Canal. The original location of the pumping station is not known with any certainty, but the engine, now known as the Smethwick Engine, was moved nearer to the canal around 1790, at a location where part of the existing supply tunnel could be reused. The feeder was made navigable at that time, so that coal could be delivered to the engine by barge. As the engine now only had to raise water by 20 feet (6.1 m), instead of 38 feet (12 m), the 24-inch (61 cm) pump was moved to Ocker Hill, and a new 30-inch (76 cm) pump was fitted. By 1803 the engine was in poor condition, and was refurbished by Boulton and Watt, which included fitting a new 33-inch (84 cm) cylinder in place of the previous 32-inch (81 cm) one. A second engine was ordered in February 1804, and was operational from 2 May 1805.

By 1824 the Birmingham Canal Navigations operated more than 70 miles (110 km) of canals, with connections to several independent canals. However, they were faced with the new threat of a railway being built from Birmingham to Liverpool, and engaged Thomas Telford to advise them on improvements that could be made. He recommended that a new reservoir should be built at Rotton Park to improve the water supply, and that the main line should be improved by a number of deep cuttings, to enable it to follow a straighter route at a lower level than the old main line, as well as sowing the seeds for the Birmingham and Liverpool Junction Canal, to link the network to the River Mersey. The reservoir was built, and the improvements to the main line were completed in September 1827. Near Smethwick Summit, Telford's new main line ran close to the existing James Brindley Old Main Line, but was 20 feet (6.1 m) lower, as it avoided Smethwick locks.

In order to get water from the new Rotton Park Reservoir, Telford extended the Engine Arm eastwards, creating a basin beyond the engine house. This was fed with water from the reservoir by a new culvert. The Engine Arm was carried over Telford's new canal to rejoin the upper level by the cast iron Engine Arm Aqueduct, which was installed around 1828. It is now a Scheduled Ancient Monument, as are the excavated foundations of the Smethwick Engine, at the corner of Rolfe Street and Bridge Street North.

Boulton and Watt carried out major repairs to the original engine in 1853 and fixed failures to both engines in 1876. In March 1878, both engines were running 24 hours a day at full capacity. By 1891, they were reaching the end of their lives and were beyond economical repair, so in 1892 they were replaced by a new engine house near Brasshouse Lane bridge. It was the last pumping engine to be installed on this section of canal and initially contained two vertical compound engines with centrifugal pumps. These could pump enough water to fill 200 locks each day. It remained in use until 1905, when one of them was moved to Bentley. The remaining engine continued to be used until the 1920s.

The two beam engines remained on site for another five years, until they were dismantled and the building demolished in 1897. The newer engine was sold for scrap, but the older engine was transported by barge to Ocker Hill, where it was reassembled, so that it could be used for demonstrations. It was last steamed there in 1919 for the James Watt Centenary celebrations. Henry Ford tried to buy it in 1928 for his museum of Physical Science in Detroit, but the company did not want to part with it, and sold him an engine from Ashted. When Ocker Hill Works closed in 1960, the engine was dismantled again, to be donated to the Birmingham Museum of Science and Industry. After a period in storage, it is now displayed in the Power Up Gallery at Thinktank, Birmingham Science Museum.

The end of the arm is used for residential moorings, with space for 16 boats. It is managed by the Canal and River Trust, and the site includes a facilities block, car parking for residents and electric hook-ups for the boats.

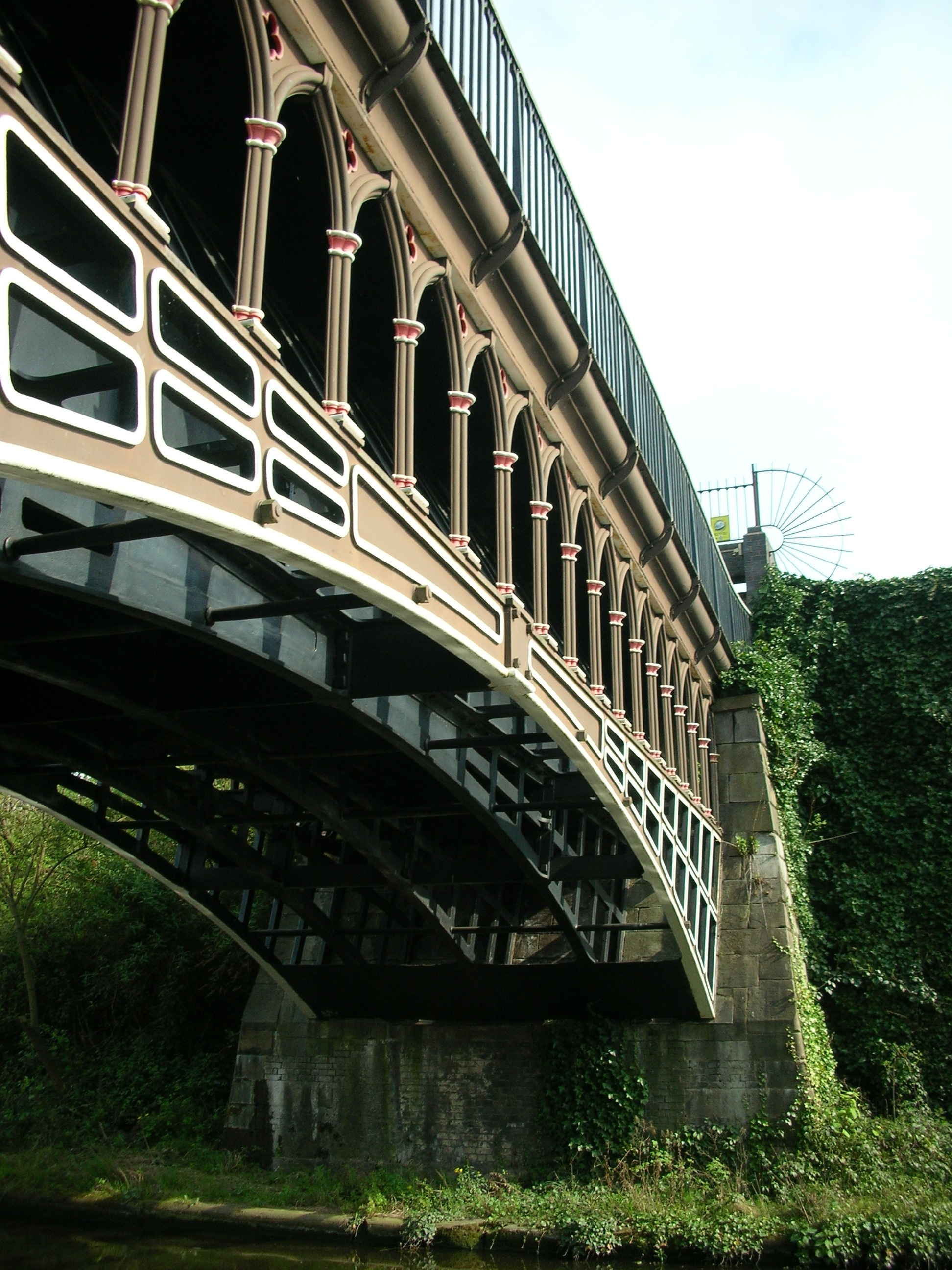
Telford's cast iron aqueduct

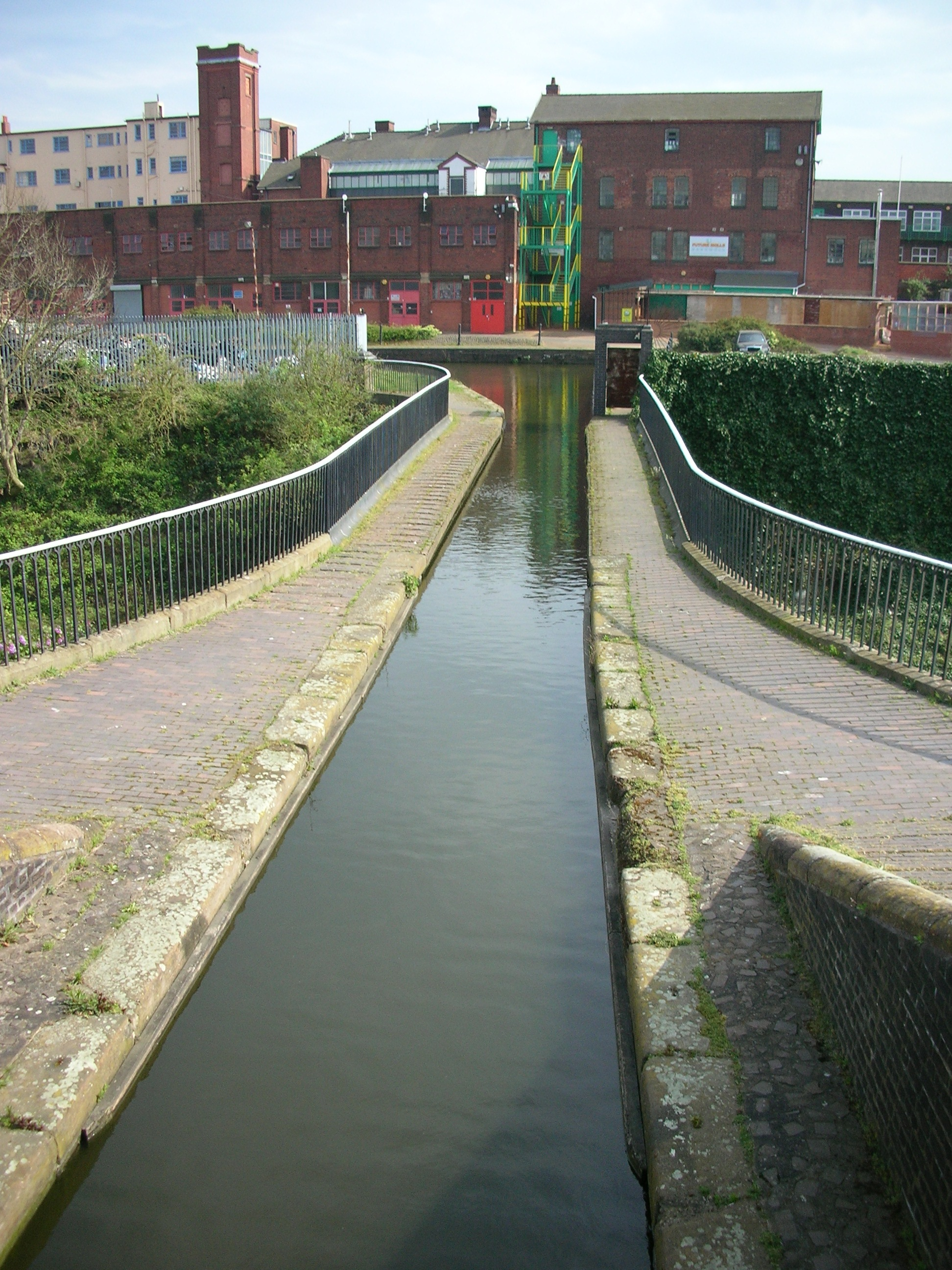
The top of the aqueduct

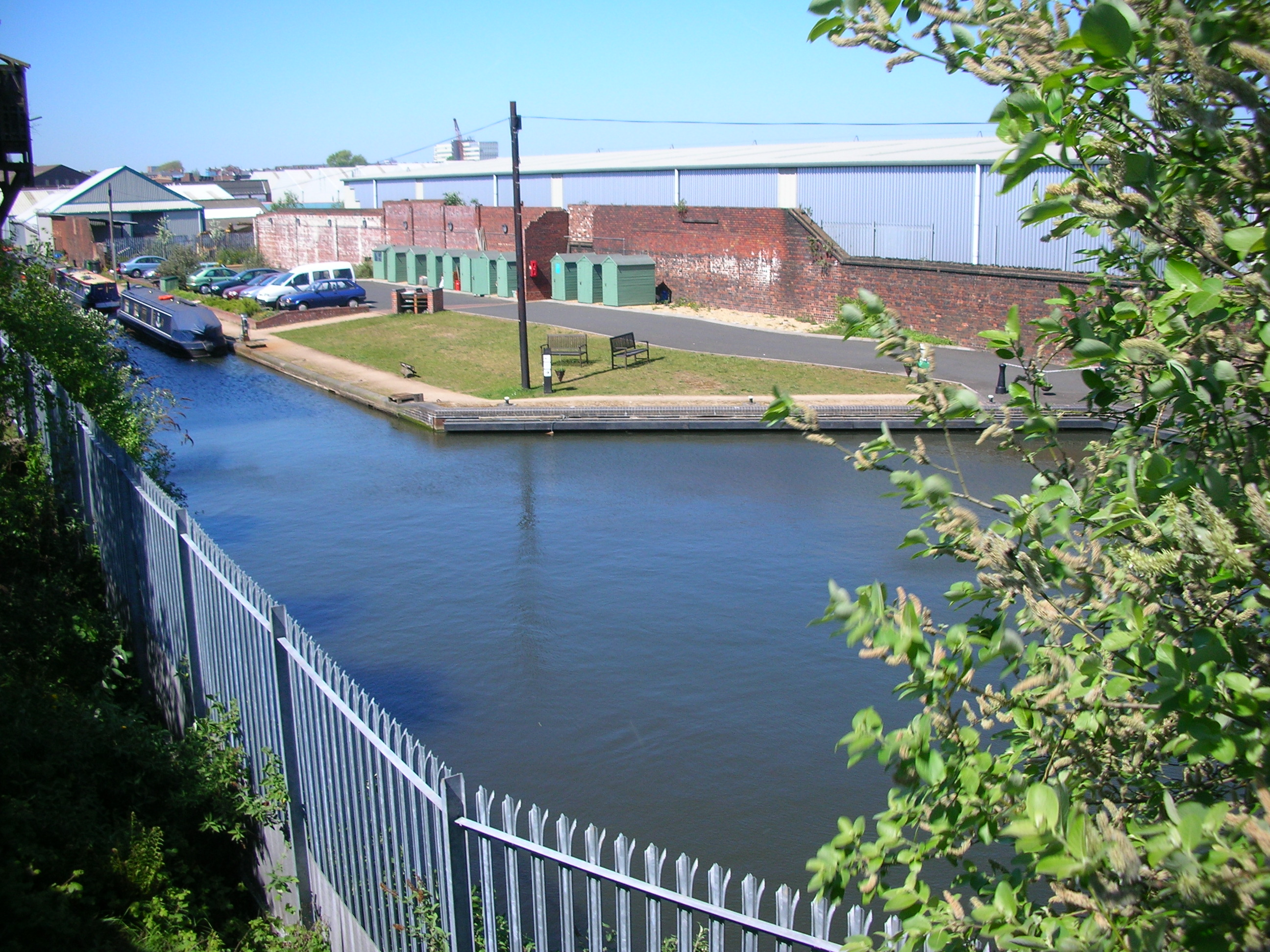
Engine Arm Basin - private moorings at the end of the navigable section

== See also ==
- Canals of the United Kingdom
- History of the British canal system

== Bibliography ==
- Broadbridge, S R (1974). The Birmingham Canal Navigations. Vol. 1: 1768-1846. David and Charles. ISBN 978-0-7153-6381-2.
- Hadfield, Charles (1985). The Canals of the West Midlands. David and Charles. ISBN 978-0-7153-8644-6.
- Nicholson (2003). Nicholson Guides Vol 3: Birmingham and the heart of England. Harper Collins. ISBN 978-0-00-713666-7.
- Pearson, Michael (1989). Canal Companion - Birmingham Canal Navigations. J. M. Pearson & Associates. ISBN 978-0-907864-49-3.
- Weaver, C P; Weaver, C R (July 1970). The Smethwick Pumping Stations (PDF). Journal. Vol. XVI No 3. Railway and Canal Historical Society. Archived (PDF) from the original on 27 February 2021.
