= Galton Valley Canal Heritage Centre =

Canal museum in Smethwick, England

Coordinates: 52.4987°N 1.9723°W

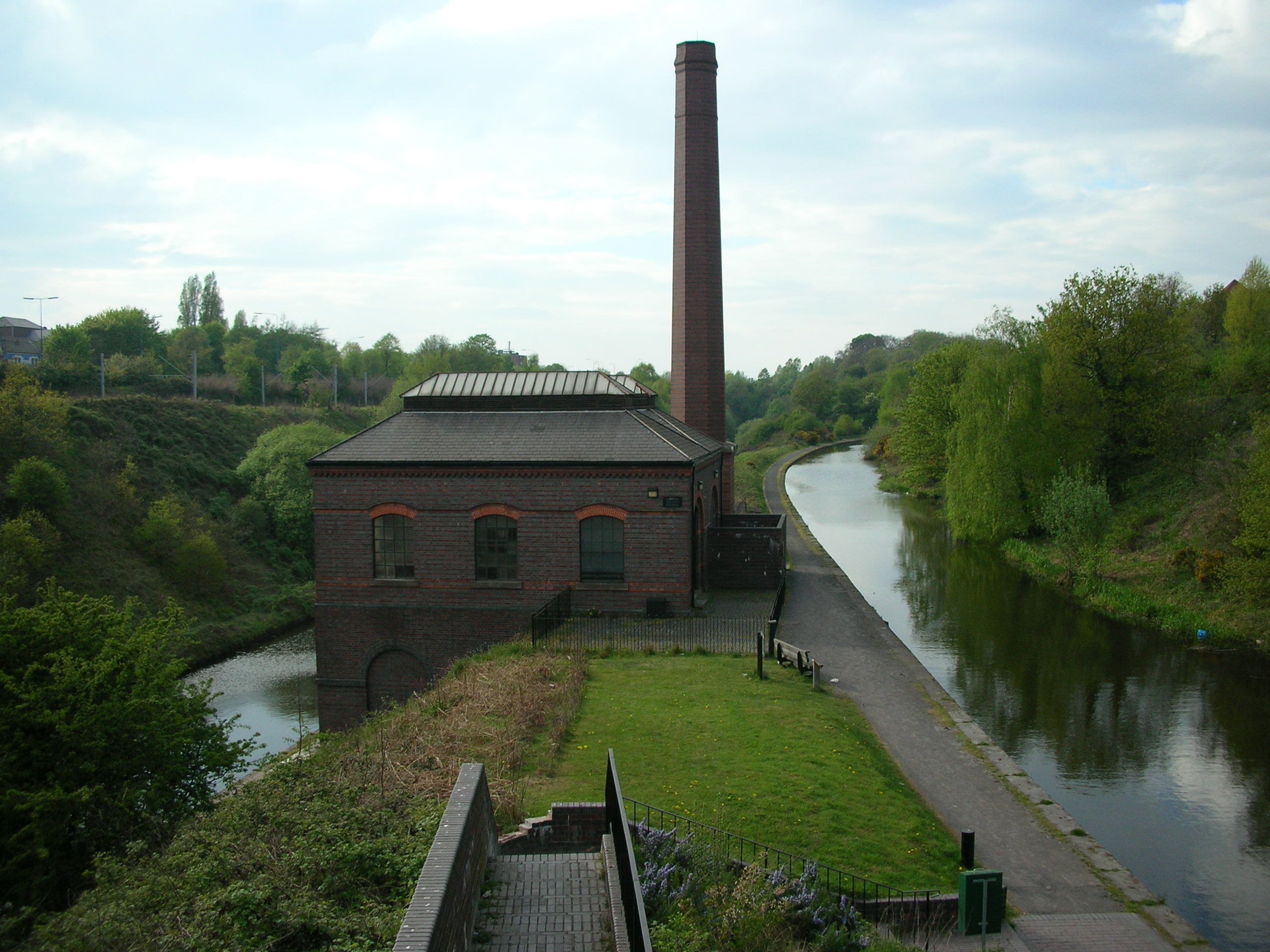
The New Smethwick Pumping Station

Galton Valley Canal Museum is a small museum, located in Smethwick, England, on the border with Birmingham and alongside the BCN Main Line canals. The Museum tells the story of the development of the Galton Valley canals and those who designed, built and worked on them.

In 2009 it won the Silver award in the 'Best Small Visitor Attraction' at the Black Country Tourism Awards. In 2011 the museum moved from premises on Brasshouse Lane Smethwick to the New Smethwick Pumping Station, which is opened occasionally by Sandwell Museum Service and The Friends of Galton Valley. Because of the limited space at the pumping station, many of the artifacts from the original museum were moved to the Smethwick Heritage Centre in Victoria Park.

== New Smethwick Pumping Station ==
The New Smethwick Pumping Station is situated between the Birmingham Old and New Main Line Canals. It first opened in 1892 with the purpose of pumping water from the lower Birmingham New Main Line to the high Old Main Line Canal to replace the water lost from the higher level when boats went through the Smethwick locks. The station only had a short working life, closing in the mid 1920s due to reduced traffic on the canals. Apart from a short period during the Second World War the building sat empty until it was restored and opened as part of the Galton Valley Canal Heritage Centre in the late 1980s.

When new the Pumping Station replaced two wooden beam engines which were situated at Bridge Street and Spon Lane in Smethwick. The site in Bridge Street was the original home of James Watt's Smethwick Engine. While Watt's engine can now be seen in the Think Tank Museum in Birmingham, tours of the original site can be organised through the museum in Galton Valley.
