= Ivan Polzunov =

Ivan Ivanovich Polzunov
- Иван Иванович Ползунов
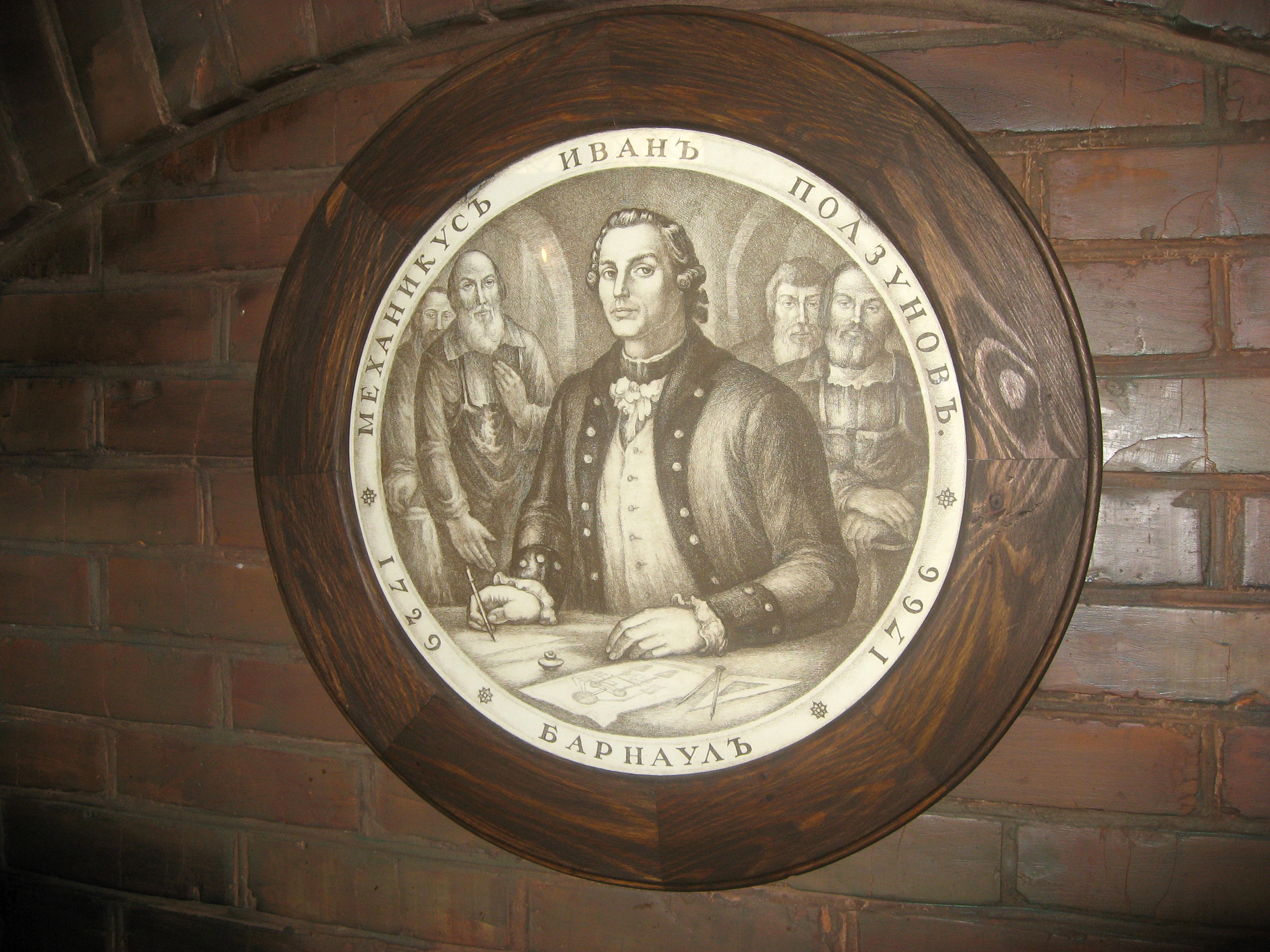
- Ivan Polzunov as depicted in Polzunov restaurant in Barnaul
- Born: March 14, 1728; Yekaterinburg
- Died: May 27, 1766 (aged 38); Barnaul
- Occupation: Inventor

Ivan Ivanovich Polzunov (Russian: Иван Иванович Ползунов 1728 – May 27, 1766 n.s.) was a Russian inventor. He created the first steam engine in Russia and the first two-cylinder engine in the world.

Minor planet 1978SP7 is named in his honour, as is a crater on the Moon.

== Biography ==
Ivan Polzunov was born in the family of a soldier of peasant origin in the town Turinsk (currently Sverdlovsk Oblast region, Russia). After graduating in 1742 from Mining school (Горнозаводская Школа) in Ekaterinburg he worked as a mechanic's apprentice for the Chief Mechanic of Ural Plants Nikita Bakharev. Beginning in 1748 he worked in Barnaul.

In the library of Barnaul plant he found works of Mikhail Lomonosov, that he studied by himself as well as the descriptions of contemporary steam machines by Johann Schlatter. In 1763 he proposed an original 1.8 h.p. (1.2kW) steam machine. The design used two cylinders on the same shaft that allowed its operations completely independently from water power even on dry places or in mountains. This design was a great step forward from contemporary steam machines that used hydropower to return the pistons and so could not be used if the hydropower was not available.

The project was sent to Empress Catherine II. She awarded him 400 rubles and promotion two ranks (to captain-poruchik) but did not seem to appreciate the new technology, as she recommended hydropower be used to return the pistons as done in Britain.

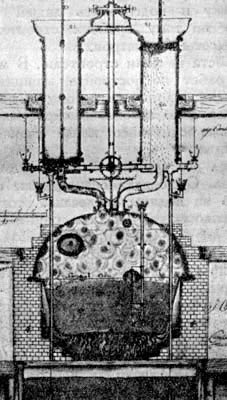
Polzunov's two-cylinder steam engine.

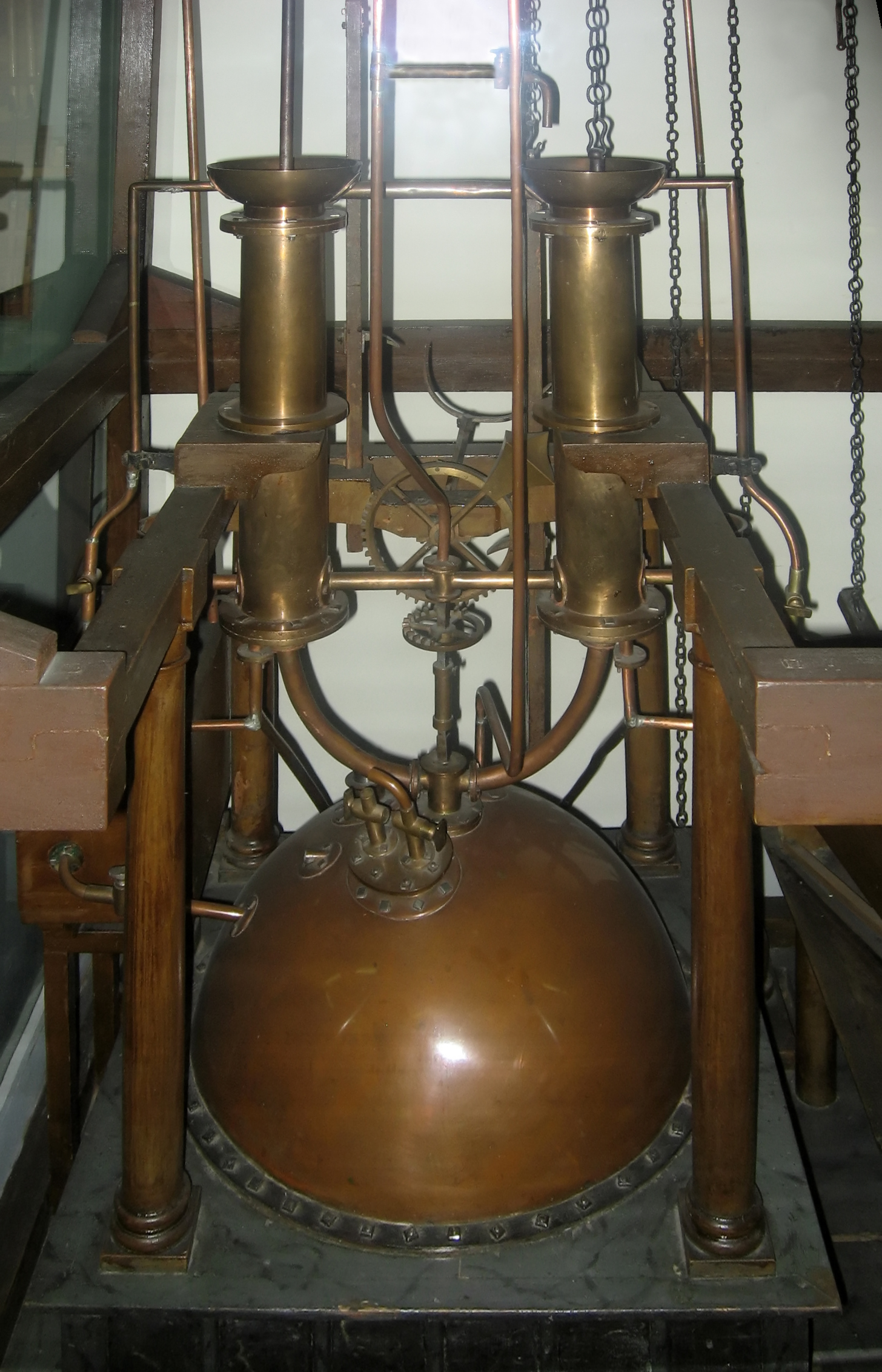
Replica of Polzunov's engine

In 1765 Polzunov designed a large 32 h.p. steam machine for air pumps for steel furnaces. The director of Barnaul plants general Porshin agreed to use Polzunov's two-cylinder design as Barnaul steel mills were in a very dry area and in summer they often did not have any hydropower at all.

The machine was assembled in the winter and spring of 1766; the machine hall had very thin walls and a lot of draughts. Ivan Polzunov's tuberculosis became much worse, he coughed blood but still worked. He died on May 27, 1766, at the age of 37, three days before the machine was finished. The machine worked three months, then was disassembled and replaced by convenient hydropower, despite paying off its costs in those three months. A working model of the steam machine made by Ivan Polzunov is in the museum of Barnaul and is still in an operational condition.
