= Engine Arm Aqueduct =

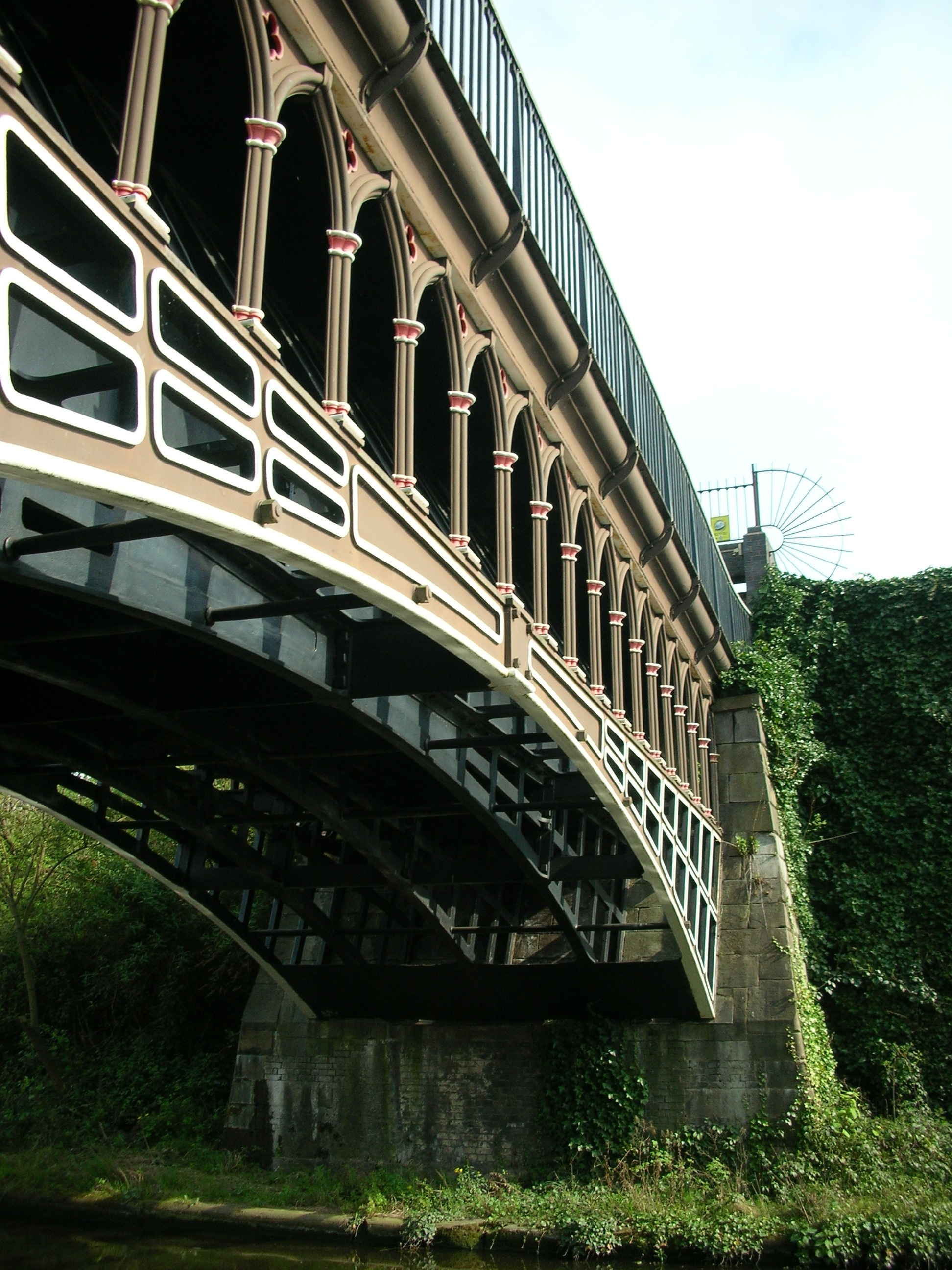
- The Engine Arm Aqueduct, cast by Horseley Ironworks
- Coordinates: 52.4979°N 1.9665°W
- OS grid reference: SP023888
- Carries: BCN Engine Arm
- Crosses: BCN New Main Line
- Locale: Smethwick
- Maintained by: Canal & River Trust
- Heritage status: Scheduled Ancient Monument

Characteristics
- Trough construction: Cast Iron
- Pier construction: Stone
- Total length: 52 feet (15.8 m)
- Width: 8 feet (2.4 m)
- Traversable?: No
- Towpaths: Both
- No. of spans: One

The Engine Arm Aqueduct is a canal aqueduct at Smethwick (near Birmingham), in the West Midlands of England. It was built in 1829 by Thomas Telford to carry a water feeder, the Engine Arm, over the New Main Line of the Birmingham Canal Navigations.

== Background ==
The Engine Arm was built as a short branch from a pumping station to supply water to the Birmingham Canal, which opened at the end of the 18th century. The original canal took a slow and circuitous route from Birmingham to Wolverhampton, partly to avoid a patch of high ground at Smethwick. The route involved short sections of level water between multiple sets of locks, which caused congestion as boat traffic increased. In the 1820s, the canal proprietors hired the engineer Thomas Telford to improve the situation. Telford built a new main line which took a much straighter route and involved a deep cutting through the high ground. The new canal bisected the Engine Arm so Telford built the aqueduct to connect with it at the new lower level.

== Design ==
The bridge is a single span of 52 feet (16 metres) in cast iron. The arch is formed from five ribs, each cast in four sections and bolted together. The ribs are connected to each other by transverse members and they are fixed to the masonry abutments. The three central ribs support the 8-foot (2.4-metre)-wide cast-iron trough which boats travel, and the outer ones support the towpaths and the bracing that connects to the sides of the trough. The towpath support consists of an arcade of Gothic arches with quatrefoil spandrels. The eastern towpath is paved in brick with raised strips for horses. The ironwork was cast at the Horseley Ironworks at Tipton, as were most of Telford's iron bridges.

== History ==
The aqueduct was completed in 1829. It is similar to several of Telford's other cast-iron bridges, including the nearby Galton Bridge and Cantlop Bridge in Shropshire. It is a scheduled monument and a Grade II* listed building, first listed on 8 February 2007, both statuses which provide legal protection from demolition or unsympathetic modification. Historic England called it "an example of Telford's work at its best, demonstrating technical innovation" in the use of cast-iron to allow greater spans than were possible with traditional masonry arches.

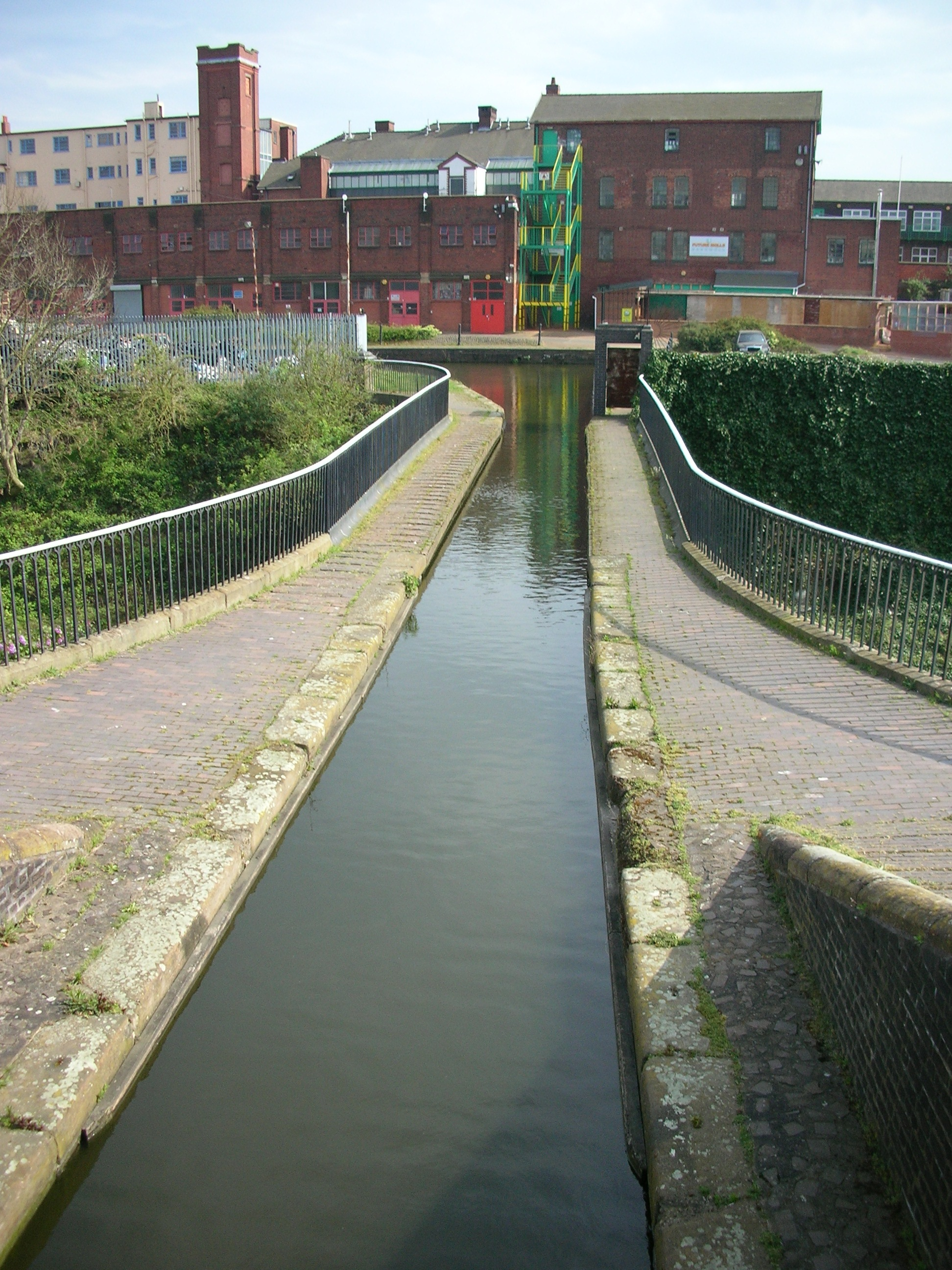
The top of the aqueduct

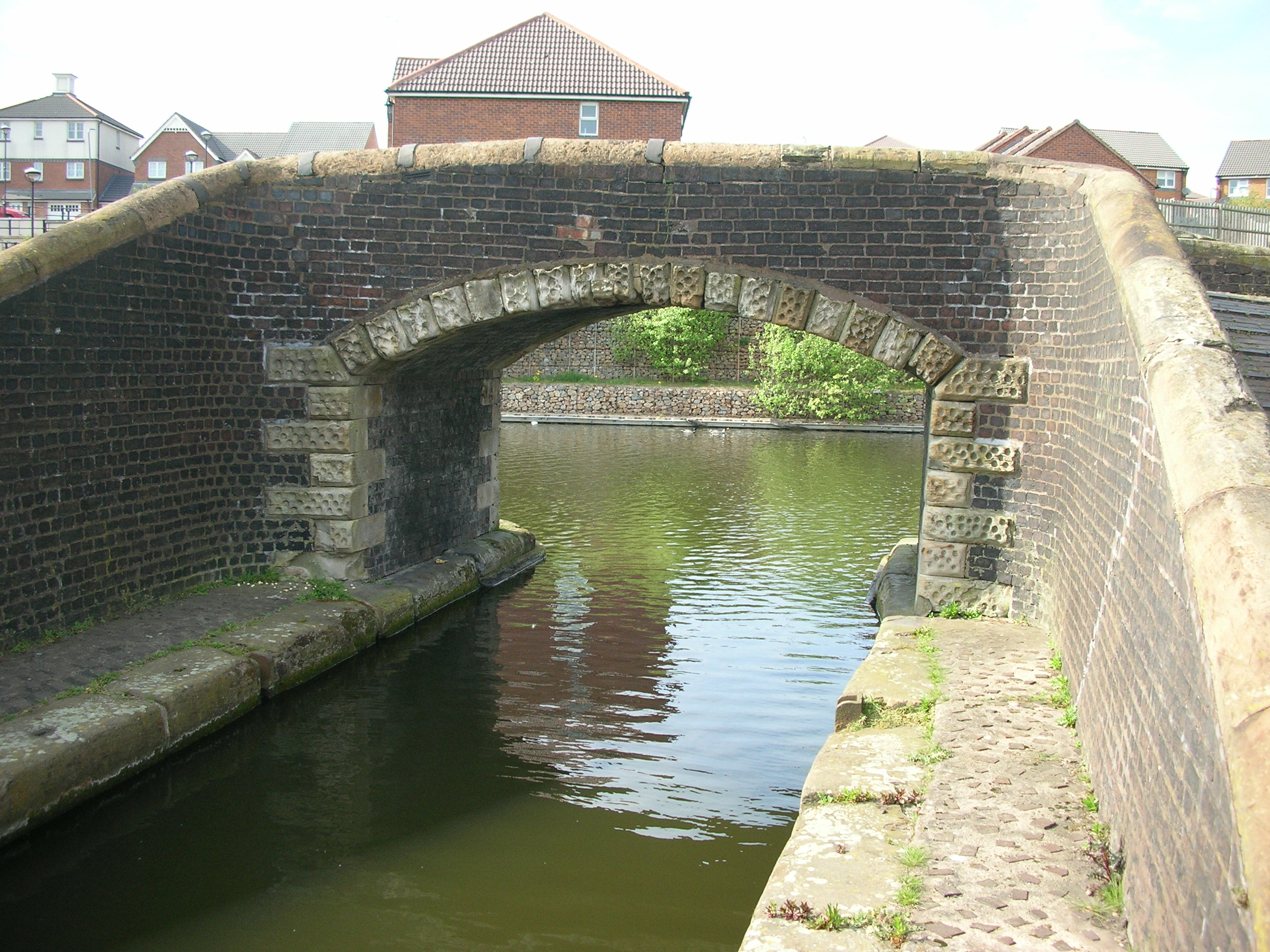
Roving bridge at the junction

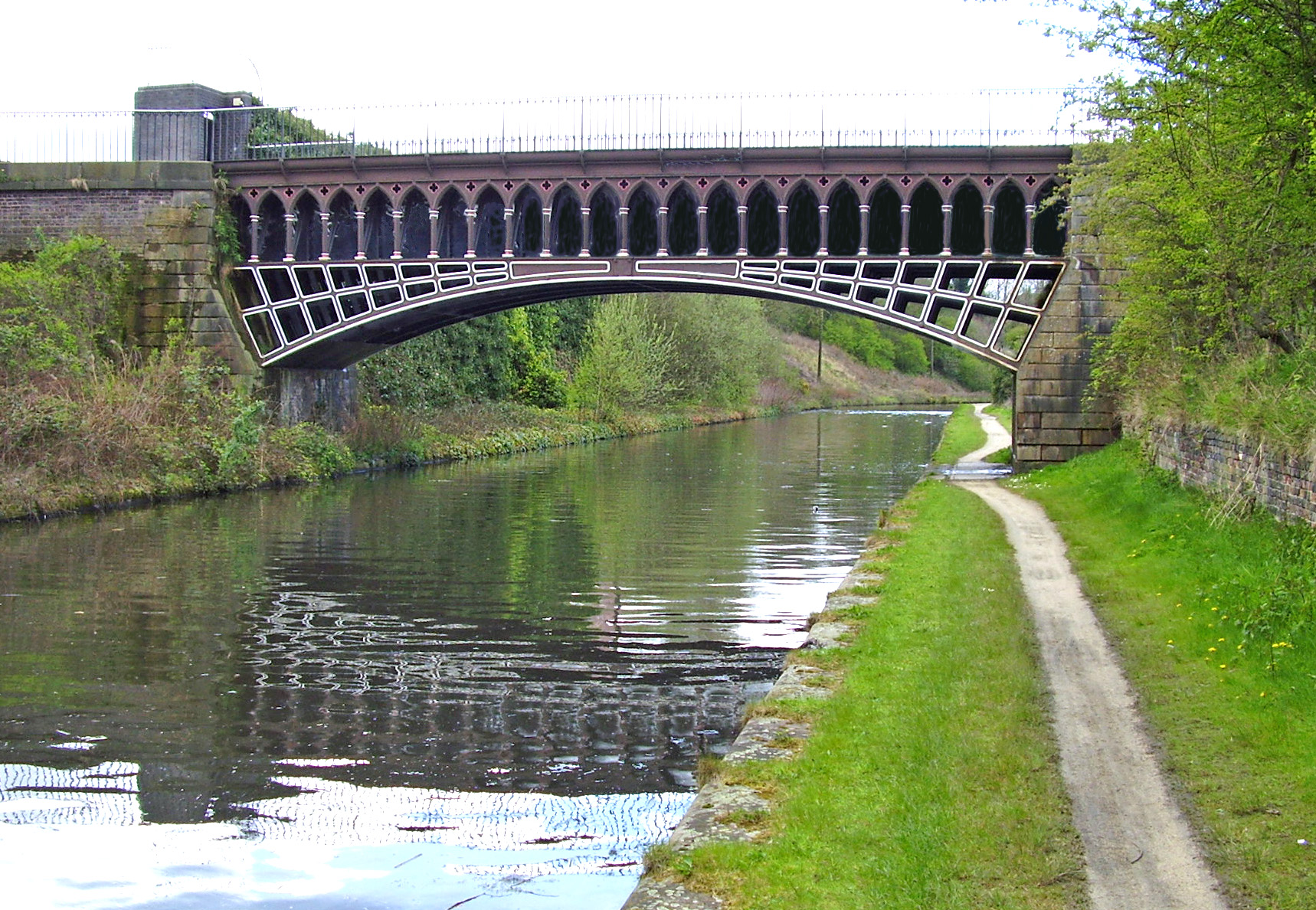
Aqueduct approaching from the east

== See also ==
- Canals of the United Kingdom
- History of the British canal system
