= Blowing engine =

Device which provides forced air to smelters

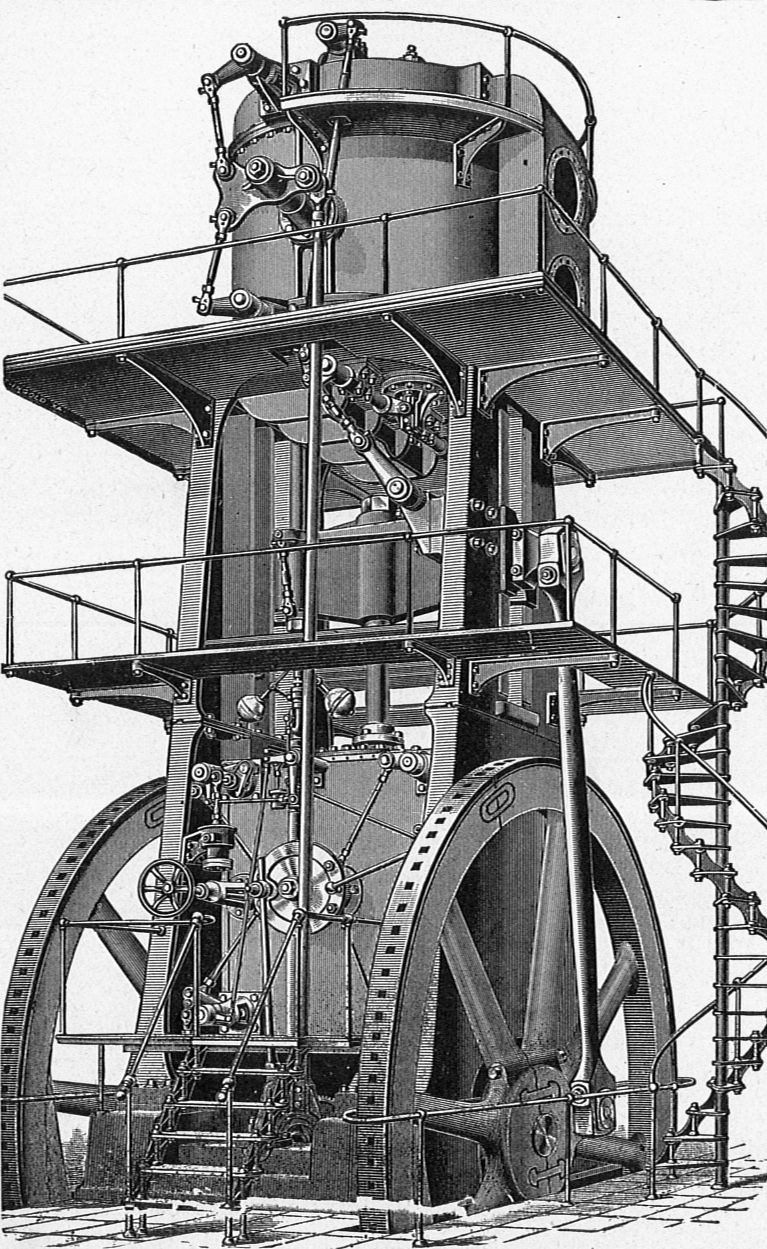
Allis vertical blowing engine

A blowing engine is a large stationary steam engine or internal combustion engine directly coupled to air pumping cylinders. They deliver a very large quantity of air at a pressure lower than an air compressor, but greater than a centrifugal fan.

Blowing engines were largely used to provide the air blast for furnaces, blast furnaces and other forms of smelter.

== Waterwheel engines ==
The very first blowing engines were the blowing houses: bellows, driven by waterwheels.

Smelters are most economically located near the source of their ore, which may not have suitable water power available nearby. There is also the risk of drought interrupting the water supply, or of expanding demand for the furnace outstripping the available water capacity.

These restrictions led to the very earliest form of steam engine used for power generation rather than pumping, the water-returning engine. With this engine, a steam pump was used to raise water that in turn drove a waterwheel and thus the machinery. Water from the wheel was then returned by the pump. These early steam engines were only suitable for pumping water, and could not be connected directly to the machinery.

The first practical examples of these engines were installed in 1742 at Coalbrookdale and as improvements to the Carron Ironworks on the Clyde in 1765.

== Beam blowing engines ==
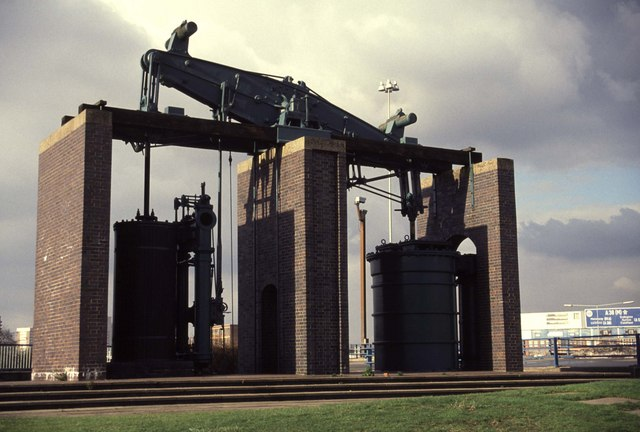
The 1817 Boulton & Watt blowing engine, formerly used at the Netherton ironworks of M W Grazebrook, now preserved on the A38(M) in Birmingham, UK

Early steam prime movers were beam engines, firstly of the non-rotative (i.e. solely reciprocating) and later the rotative type (i.e. driving a flywheel). Both of these were used as blowing engines, usually by coupling an air cylinder to the far end of the beam from the steam cylinder. Joshua Field describes an 1821 trip to Foster, Rastrick & Co. of Stourbridge, where he observed eight large beam engines, one of 30 hp working a blowing cylinder of 5 feet diameter and 6 feet stroke.

Where the later beam engines drove flywheels, this was useful for providing a more even action to the engine. The air cylinder was still driven by the beam alone and the flywheel was used solely as a flywheel, not driving an output shaft. A well-known surviving example of this type are the paired beam engines "David & Sampson", now preserved at Blists Hill open-air museum, Ironbridge Gorge. These are a pair of single-cylinder condensing beam engines, each driving an air cylinder by their own beam, but sharing a single flywheel between them. They are notable for their decorative Doric arches. The engines had a long working life: 50 years of primary service from 1851 providing the blast for the Priors Lee furnaces of the Lilleshall Company, then a further 50 years until the plant's closure as reserve engines, still being worked occasionally.

== Semi-rotative blowing engines ==
The large vertical blowing engine illustrated at the top was built in the 1890s by E. P. Allis Co. of Milwaukee (later to form part of Allis-Chalmers). The steam cylinder (lower) is 42 inches (1.1 m) diameter, the air cylinder (upper) 84 inches (2.1 m) and both with a stroke of 60 inches (1.5 m).

The steam cylinder has Reynolds-Corliss valve gear, driven via a bevel-driven auxiliary shaft beneath, at right-angles to the crankshaft. This also means that the Corliss' wrist plate is at right-angles to the flywheel, rather than parallel as is usual. Edwin Reynolds was the designer of the Allis company and in 1876 had developed an improved version of the Corliss valvegear, with improved trip gear capable of working at higher speeds. The air valves are also driven by eccentrics from this same shaft.

Like the beam engines, the main force of the piston is transmitted to the air cylinder by a purely reciprocating action and the flywheels exist to smooth the action of the engine. To permit adjustment, the steam piston rod only goes as far as the crosshead. Above this are twinned rods to the air piston. The flywheel shaft is mounted below the steam piston, the paired connecting rods driving downwards and backwards to make this a return connecting rod engine.

== Internal combustion blowing engines ==
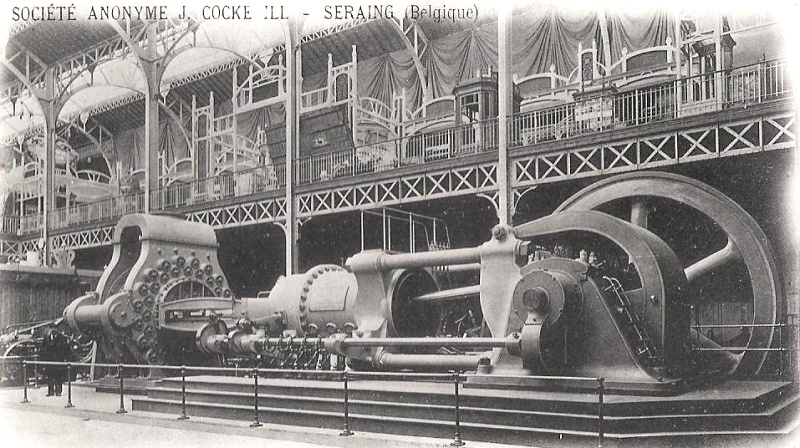
Cockerill engine of 1900

In the late 1800s, internal combustion gas engines were developed to burn gases produced from blast furnaces, eliminating the need for fuel for steam boilers and increasing efficiency. Bethlehem Steel was one such company to employ this technology. Huge, usually single-cylinder horizontal engines burned blast furnace gas. SA John Cockerill of Belgium and Körting of Hannover were both noted makers of such engines.

There are some efforts underway to restore a few of these engines. A few firms still manufacture and install multi cylinder internal combustion engines to burn waste gasses today.

== Replacement by rotary blowers ==
As blast furnaces re-equipped after World War II, the favoured power source was either the diesel engine or the electric motor. These both had a rotary output, which worked well with contemporary developments in centrifugal fans capable of handling the huge volumes of air. Although the reciprocating steam blowing engine continued where it was already in use, they were rarely installed after the war. These older plants began to close in the 1950s and numbers were drastically reduced throughout the West during the 1970s. Blowing engines of this form are now rare.

== Surviving examples today ==
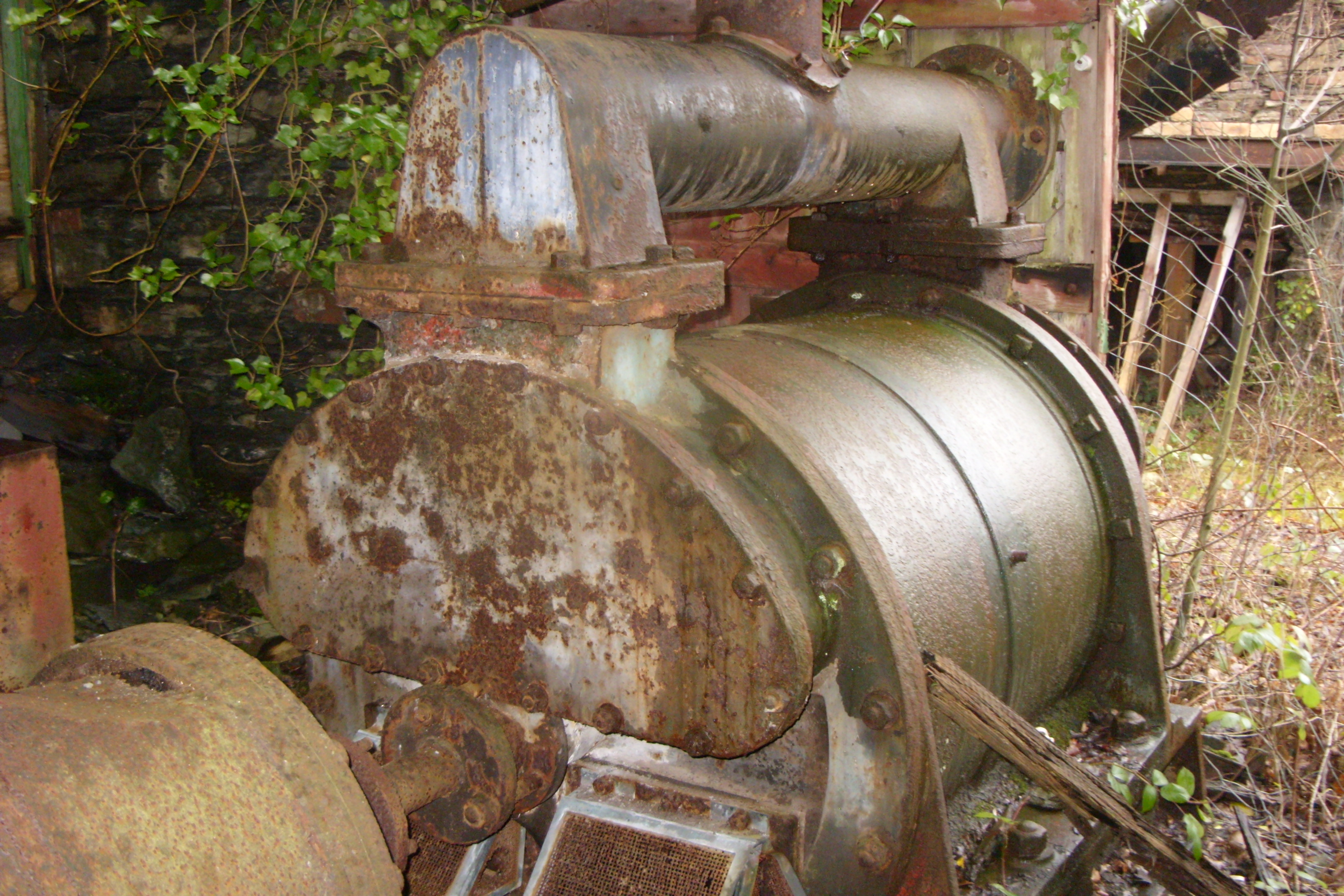
Horizontal blowing cylinder connected to a steam engine at Backbarrow ironworks

Examples of both a beam blowing engine and a vertical engine may be seen at the Blists Hill open-air museum, Ironbridge Gorge. The beam engines "David & Sampson" are scheduled monuments.

An 1817 beam blowing engine by Boulton & Watt, formerly used at the Netherton ironworks of M W Grazebrook, now decorates Dartmouth Circus, a traffic island at the start of the A38(M) motorway in Birmingham (see picture above, location: 52.492537°N 1.888189°W).
