= Water levels of the Birmingham Canal Navigations =

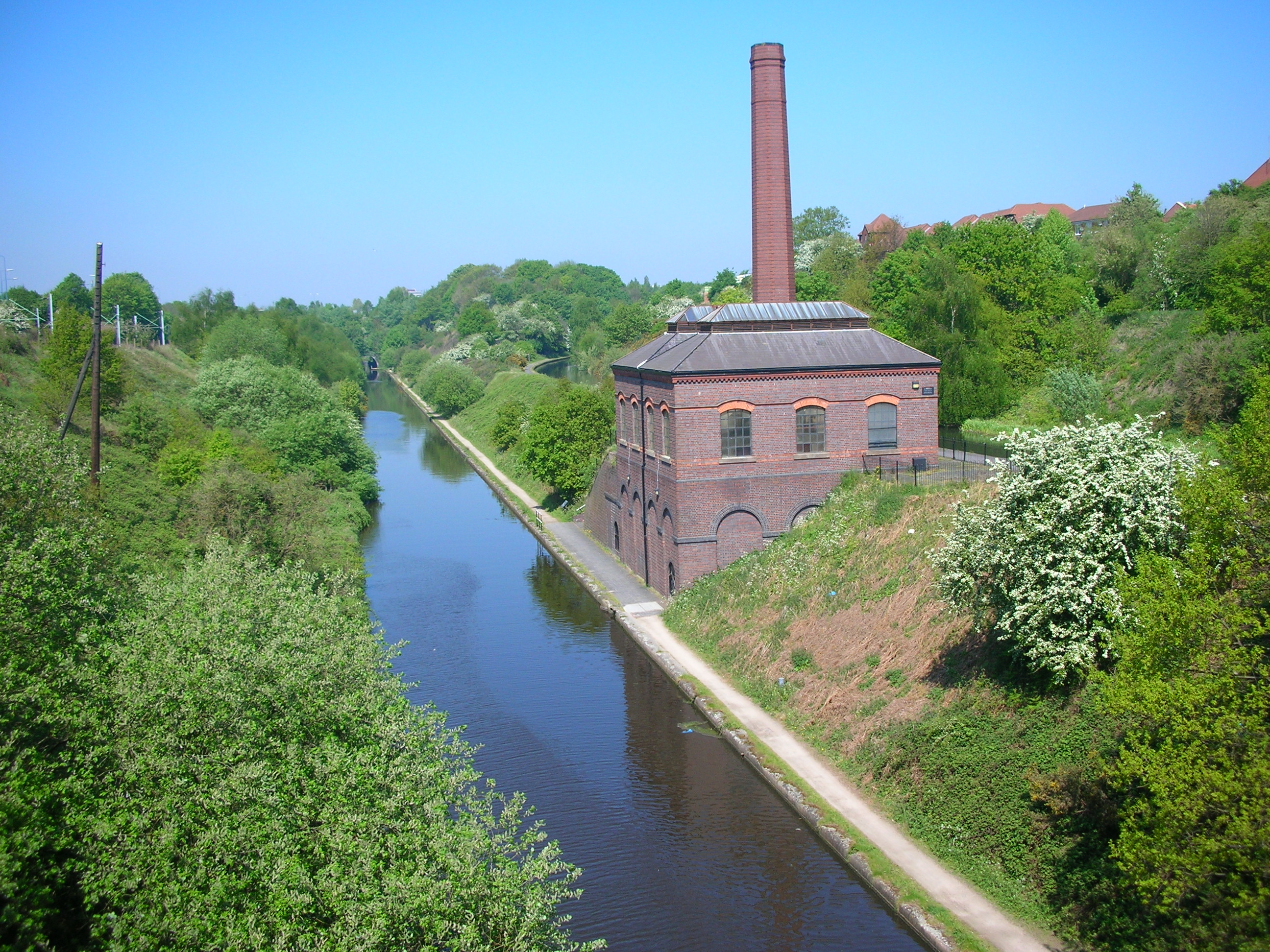
The BCN New Main Line (Birmingham Level) running to the left of the New Smethwick Pumping Station. The BCN Old Main Line (Wolverhampton Level) runs 20 ft higher, to the right of the building.

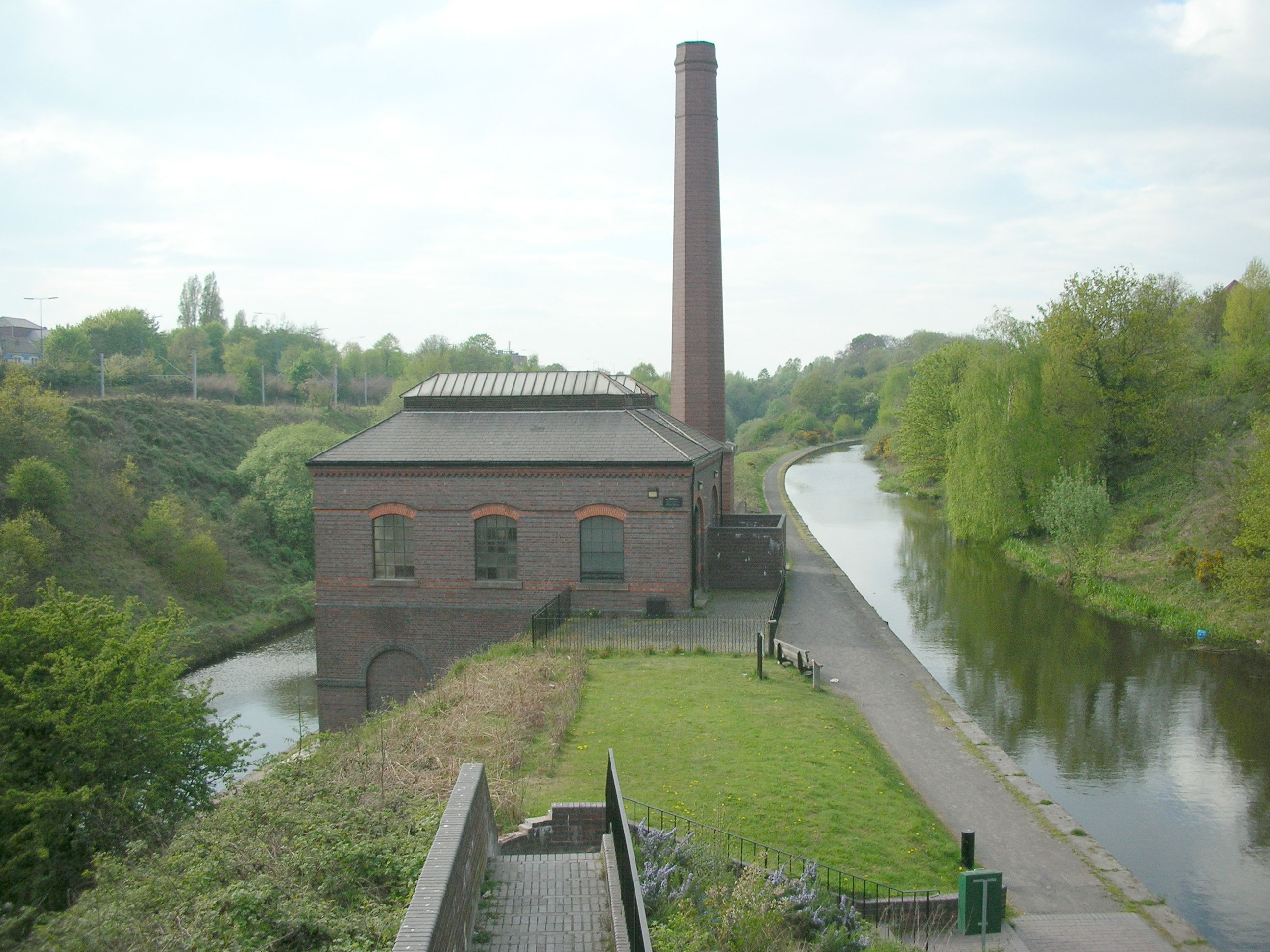
Another view of the New Smethwick Pumping Station, with the Wolverhampton Level to the right and the Birmingham Level on the left

The Birmingham Canal Navigations (BCN), a network of narrow canals in the industrial midlands of England, is built on various water levels. The three longest are the Wolverhampton, Birmingham, and Walsall levels. Locks allow boats to move from one level to another.

Heights given are nominal elevation above sea level in feet relative to the Ordnance Datum Liverpool.

== 533 ft Essington Branch ==
A former branch of the Wyrley and Essington Canal, the Essington Branch was abandoned before 1904 and is now filled in. It was the highest level on the BCN.

== 511 ft Titford Summit ==
The highest canal currently in BCN, 1 mile of which remains navigable. It was fed from the 18th century Titford Reservoir (now under Junction 2 of the M5 motorway) originally by feeder, and since 1837 by the Titford Canal. A feeder from the Tat Bank Branch (also known as Spon Lane Branch) supplies water to Edgbaston Reservoir.

== 491 ft Brindley's Smethwick Summit ==
A historical level, no longer existing. The highest level designed by James Brindley for his Birmingham Canal (BCN Old Main Line). Removed by John Smeaton's design in 1790.

== 473 ft Wolverhampton Level ==
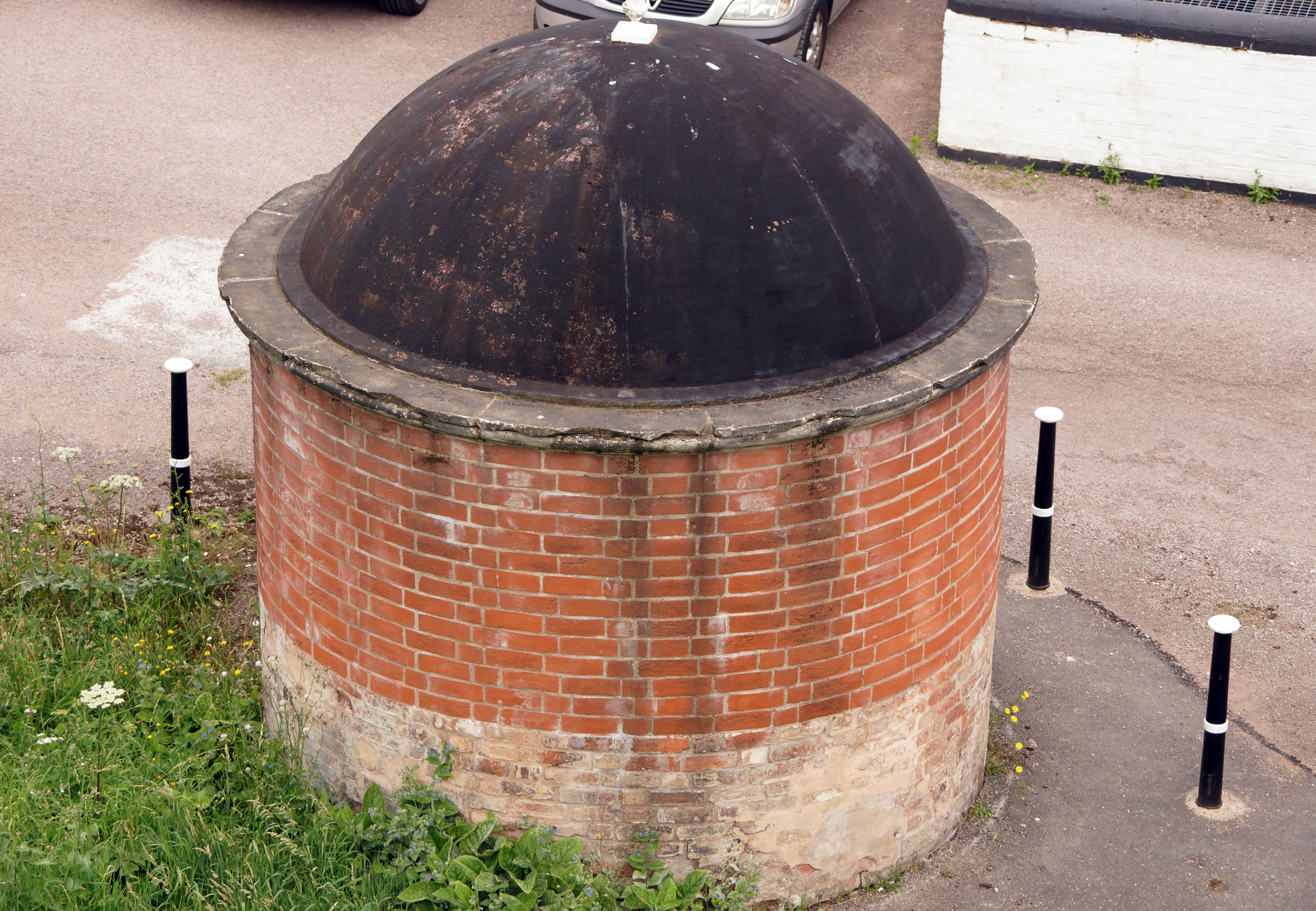
Valve house below Edgbaston Reservoir, early feed to the Wolverhampton Level along the Smethwick feeder

A total of 41.7 miles navigable without locks:

- BCN Old Main Line Wolverhampton top lock to Smethwick locks, 11.6 miles
- Walsall Branch Canal to Walsall top lock, 0.4 miles
- Wyrley and Essington Canal 15.4 miles, + branches:
  - Lord Hay's Branch (now dry)
  - Cannock Extension Canal, 1.8 miles navigable
  - Daw End Branch to Rushall top lock, 5.3 miles
  - Anglesey Branch, 2.5 miles
- Wednesbury Oak Loop, 1.9 miles
- Engine Arm, 0.5 miles
- Dudley Canal to Parkhead locks (including Dudley Tunnel), 2.3 miles

== 453 ft Birmingham Level ==
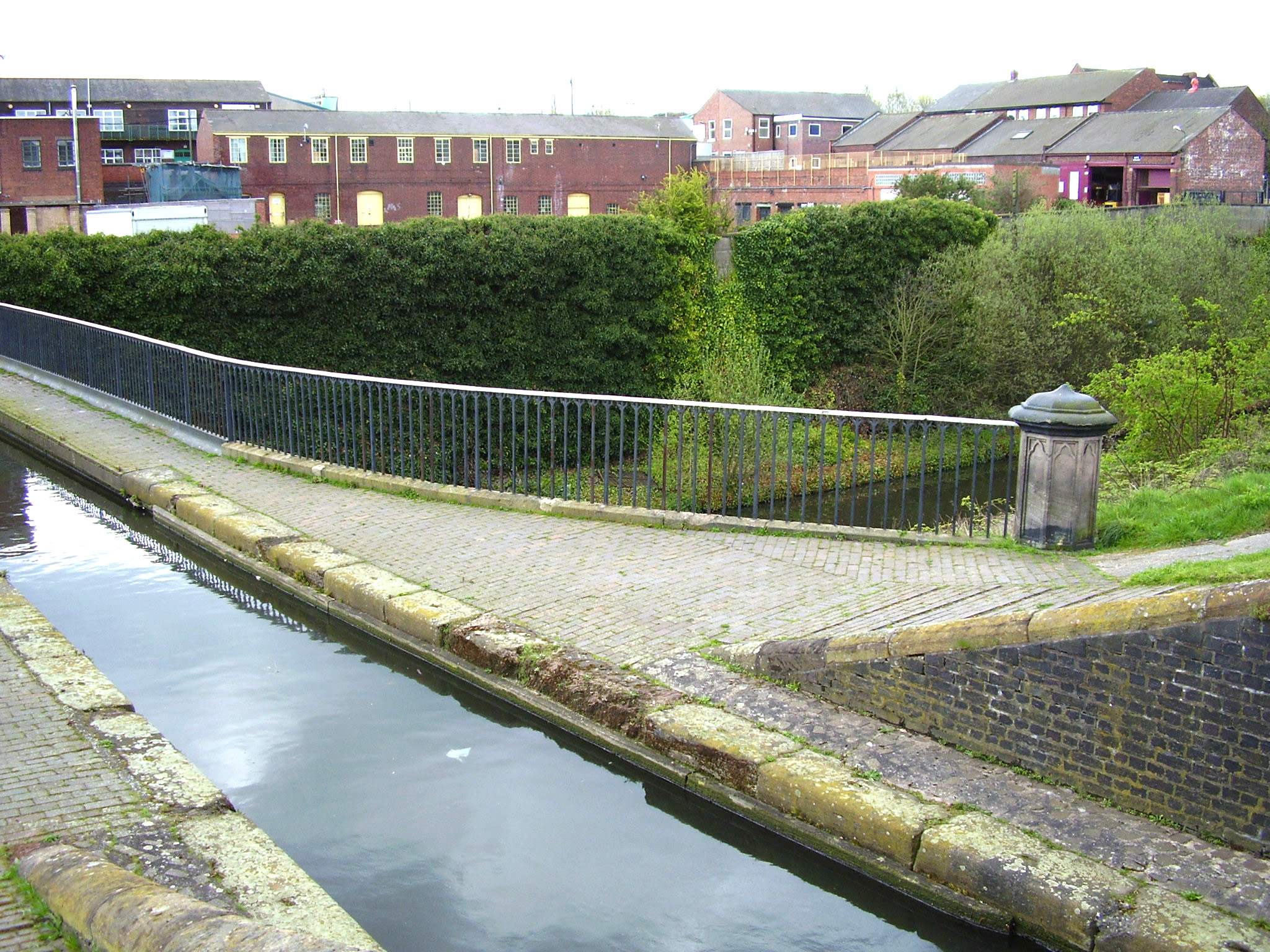
Engine Arm Aqueduct carrying the Engine Arm (Wolverhampton Level) over the New Main Line (Birmingham Level).

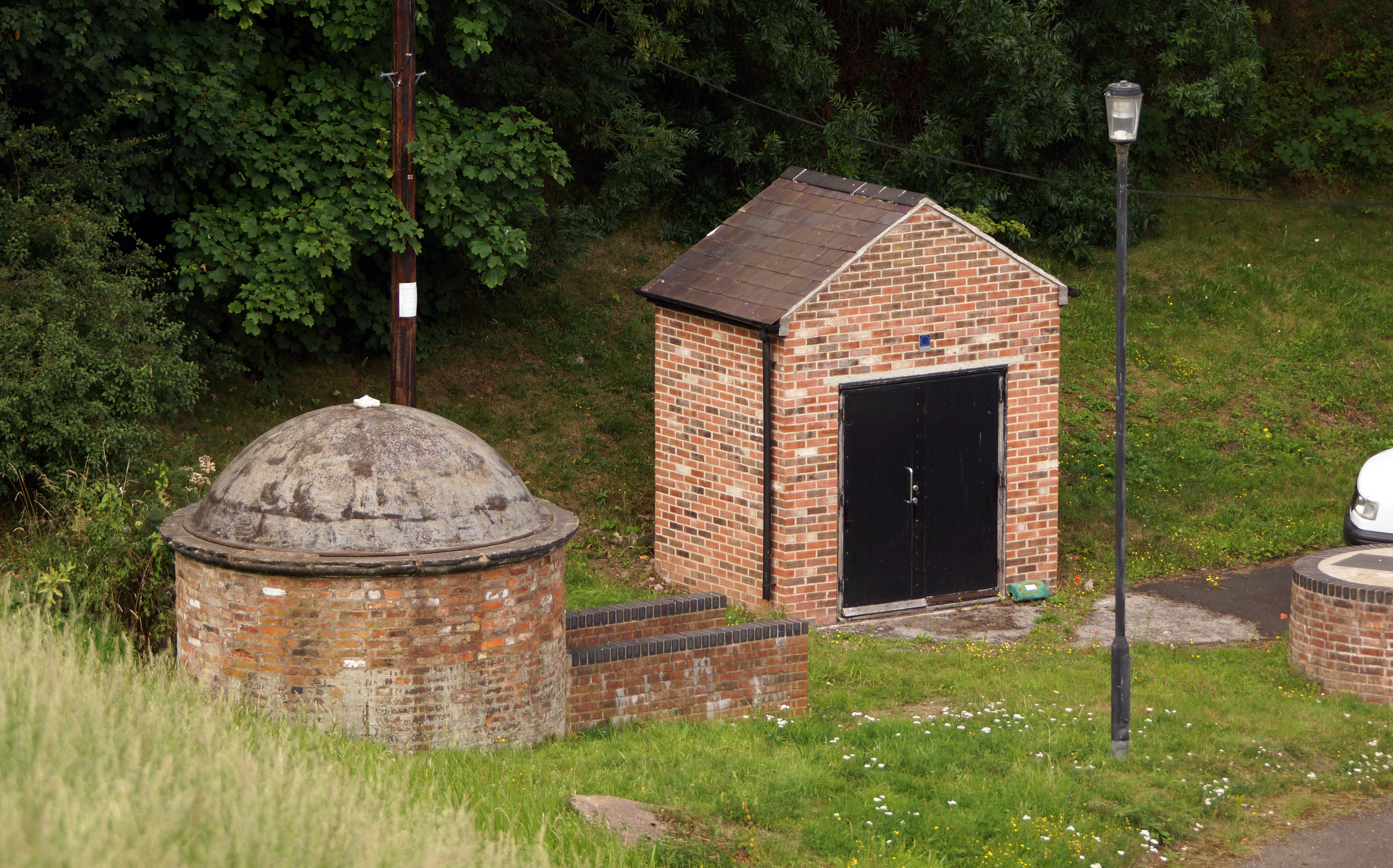
Valve house below Edgbaston Reservoir feeding the Birmingham Level

A total of 49.2 miles at this level (21.2 miles of which is on the BCN) navigable without locks.

- BCN Main Line, 10.8 miles navigable
  - BCN Old Main Line, south of Smethwick Locks
  - BCN New Main Line - Birmingham to Tipton Factory Bottom Lock, Island line, New Line at Smethwick
- Newhall Branch to Farmer's Bridge Junction, 0.2 miles
- Gower Branch Canal to Brades Hall locks, 0.5 miles
- Netherton Tunnel Branch Canal, 2.4 miles to Windmill End Junction
- Wednesbury Old Canal and Ridgacre Branch, 1.4 miles navigable
- Dudley No. 2 Canal from Parkhead locks (Blower's Green) to Hawne Basin (originally to Selly Oak), and Bumble Hole Branch Canal, 5.9 miles navigable.
- Gas Street Basin

Connecting canals, not part of the BCN, but using this level:

- Worcester and Birmingham Canal to Tardebigge top lock, 17 miles
- Northern Stratford-upon-Avon Canal from Kings Norton Junction to Lapworth Top Lock, 11 miles

== 441 ft Dudley No. 1 ==
- Dudley Canal, 1.8 miles navigable without locks.

== 408 ft Walsall Level ==
A total of 13.4 miles navigable without locks.

- Walsall Canal (Ryders Green bottom lock to Walsall Town Wharf), 6.5 miles, + branches:
  - Ocker Hill Tunnel Branch (private moorings), 0.2 miles navigable.
  - Gospel Oak Branch, 0.1 miles navigable.
  - Bradley Branch, part (abandoned)
  - Bilston Branch (abandoned)
  - Willenhall Branch (abandoned)
  - Anson Branch (abandoned)
- Tame Valley Canal to Perry Barr top lock, 5.7 miles.
- Rushall Canal (Rushall junction to Rushall bottom lock), 0.9 miles.

== Reservoirs ==
To keep the canals topped up with water, reservoirs were built to collect water from streams. These had to be above the relevant canal levels, often some distance away. The small Titford Reservoir (Titford Pool), as well as feeding the Titford Canal supplies its surplus water to Edgbaston Reservoir along a feeder through Smethwick. Water from Edgbaston Reservoir feeds the Birmingham Level at the adjacent Icknield Port Loop, and once fed the Wolverhampton Level via a long feeder (now overgrown and dry) along the top of a raised embankment along Telford's BCN New Main Line to the Engine Arm. Water is also supplied by Chasewater and Netherton Reservoirs.

== Water pumping ==
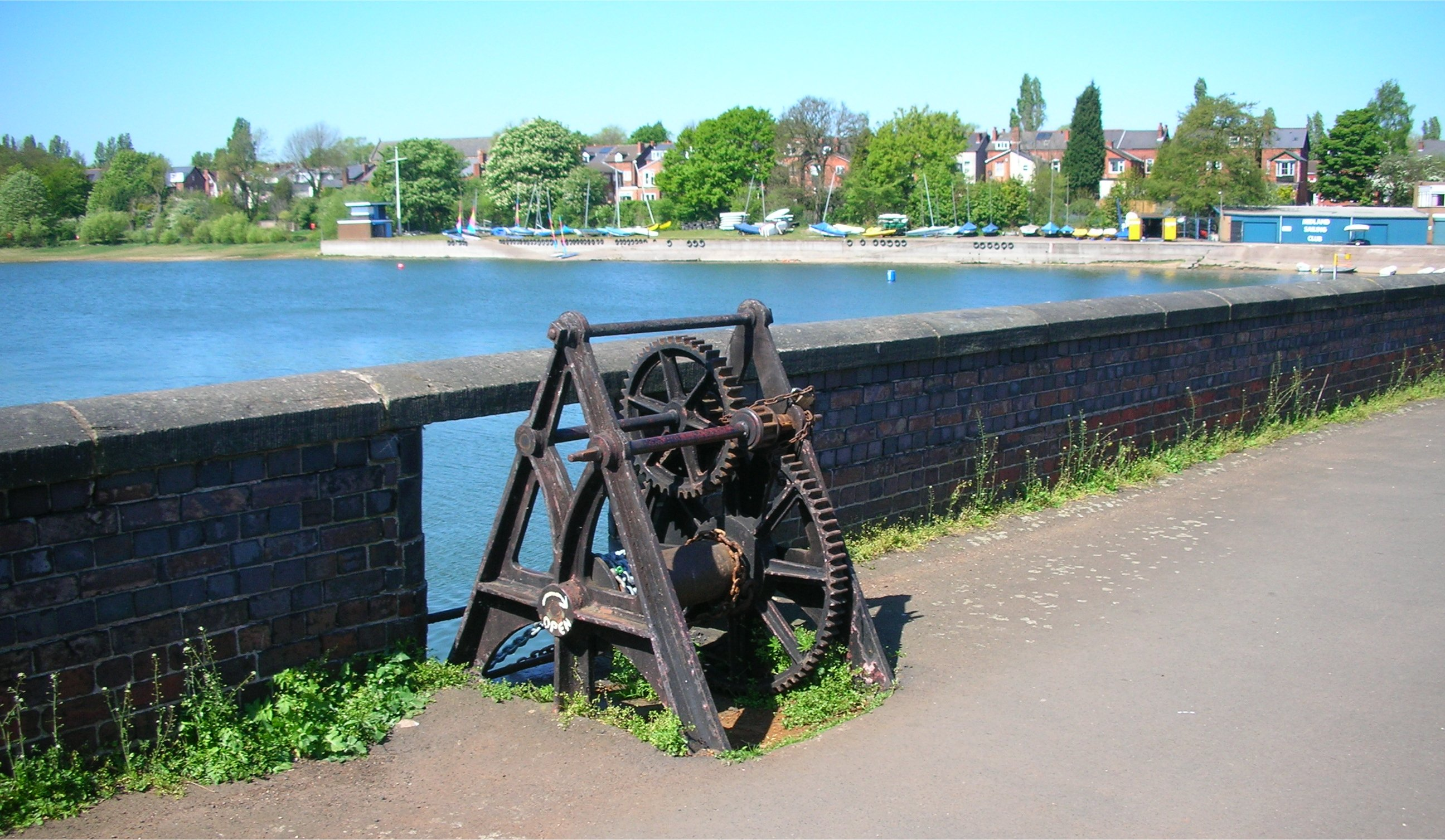
Edgbaston (Rotton Park) Reservoir was an early source of water for the Birmingham Canal

Water was a precious resource, spent each time a lock was emptied as a boat changed level. Steam pumps were employed at many flights of locks to pump water back to a higher level, for example, the Smethwick Engine.

- Back pumping at locks
  - Ashtead
  - Titford
  - Perry Barr
  - Walsall
  - Dudley Parkhead
- Back pumping between levels
  - Ocker Hill
  - Smethwick Summit
    - Spon Lane engine (1778–1790) pumping Wolverhampton level to 491 ft Summit level, closed by Smeaton's removal of the Summit level
    - Smethwick Engine (1779–1898) pumping Birmingham level to 491 ft Summit level, pumping to Wolverhampton level after Summit lowered. It was replaced in 1892 by two centrifugal engines in a new pumphouse north of Brasshouse Lane Bridge, Smethwick.
- Pumping to reservoirs
  - Edgbaston Reservoir (Rotton Park)
  - Chasewater Reservoir (Cannock Chase)
  - Lodge Farm Reservoir (Netherton)
  - Sneyd Reservoir (Bloxwich)
- Water was also pumped out from many coal mines into the canal system.

== See also ==
- Canals of the United Kingdom
- History of the British canal system
