= Walsall Canal =

Canal in the West Midlands, England

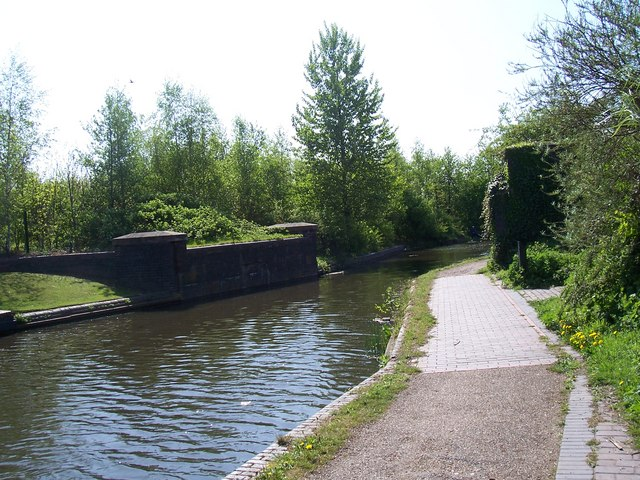
- Site of a removed bridge on the canal
- Interactive map of Walsall Canal

Specifications
- Length: 7 miles (11 km)
- Locks: 16
- Status: Navigable
- Navigation authority: Canal and River Trust

History
- Date of act: 1784

Geography
- Connects to: Wyrley and Essington Canal; Wednesbury Old Canal

The Walsall Canal is a narrow canal, 7 feet or 2.1 metres wide, and 7 miles (11 km) long, forming part of the Birmingham Canal Navigations, and passing around the western side of Walsall, West Midlands, England. It was built in four stages, the first being a detached part of the Birmingham and Fazeley Canal from Ryders Green Junction to Broadwaters, started in 1783. The Birchills Branch of the Wyrley and Essington Canal opened in 1798, the end of which eventually formed another part of the canal. The third section was built in two phases, from Broadwaters to Darlaston and from there to Walsall. This opened around 1800. The final section was a flight of eight locks to link the canal at Walsall to the Birchills Branch, and this was opened in 1841.

The authorising act of Parliament for the Broadwaters section, the Birmingham and Fazeley Canal Act 1783 (23 Geo. 3. c. 92), also allowed the company to build six collateral cuts, to serve the growing coal mining and ironstone industries. This increased to ten branches, but three of them became interconnections to other parts of the canal network. The Toll End Branch was extended by the Toll End Communication Canal to join the Birmingham Canal Navigations main line at Tipton Green. The Bradley Hall Extension was extended to become the Bradley Branch, linking to the Gospel Oak Loop Line, originally part of the Birmingham Canal Navigations old main line until it was bypassed. The Anson Branch remained a branch, but the Bentley Canal was a branch of it until it was extended to the Wyrley and Essington Canal at Wednesfield. All three interconnections have been closed, but there is an active restoration project to reinstate the Bradley Branch.

The canal starts at the Birmingham Level at Ryders Green Junction, descends 45 feet (14 m) through the eight Ryders Green locks to the Walsall Level, and rises 65 feet (20 m) through the eight Walsall locks to the Wolverhampton Level of the Wyrley and Essington Canal.

== Route ==
At its southern end, the Walsall Canal is accessible from Pudding Green Junction on the Birmingham Canal Navigations (BCN) main line via a short section of the Wednesbury Old Canal, which runs for 0.7 miles (1.1 km) to Riders Green Junction. The Wednesbury Old Canal continues for another 0.5 miles (0.8 km) to a junction with the former Ridgeacre Branch Canal, after which it has been abandoned. From Riders Green Junction the canal immediately starts to descend through the Rider's Green flight of eight locks, which lower the canal by 45 feet (14 m). The B4149 Phoenix Street crosses just below the first lock, and Great Bridge Street crosses below the seventh. The towpath is on the west bank of the canal. The canal passes beneath two further bridges, carrying Brickhouse Lane South and the A461 Great Western Way and over an aqueduct crossing the River Tame to reach the final lock of the flight. The canal is now at the 408-foot (124 m) Walsall Level. The west face of the aqueduct was rebuilt by workers from the Birmingham Canal Navigations, and carries a plate showing a date of 1901.

The former South Staffordshire line railway crosses, and there used to be a junction with the Toll End Communication Canal which rose through seven locks to the BCN Main Line. From Doe Bank Junction the Tame Valley Canal heads eastwards and the very short Ocker Hill Tunnel Branch, now private moorings, fed water to the Ocker Hill pumps to replenish the Wednesbury Oak Loop and hence the Wolverhampton Level. It continues northwards, where it is crossed by the A4037 Leabrook Road Bridge. Just before it reaches the junction with the unnavigable Gospel Oak Branch, the towpath crosses to the east bank at Wiggins Mill Bridge. The West Midlands Metro line crosses next, using the trackbed of the former Birmingham, Wolverhampton and Dudley Railway, and the canal passes the stub of the Bradley Branch at Moorcroft Junction. Holyhead Road Bridge and Darlaston Road Bridge are part of a roundabout, where the A41 and A4038 meet. The canal continues along the western edge of Darlaston, passing under Wolverhampton Street bridge and Midland Road Bridge, which carries the A462.

As it passes under Bughole Bridge which carries Willenhall Road and Bentley Road Bridge, the canal turns to the east. An aqueduct carries it over the Grand Junction Railway, to the north-east of Darlaston, and it reaches the junction with the former Anson Branch, which once led to the Bentley Canal, abandoned by the British Transport Commission Act 1961 (9 & 10 Eliz. 2. c. xxxvi). Another aqueduct carries it over Bentley Mill Way and the River Tame, before it reaches the M6 motorway bridge, just south of junction 10. The A4148 crosses at Pagetts Bridge as it turns to the north and there are bridges at Rollingmill Street and Bridgeman Street, where the towpath crosses to the west bank, but continues on the east bank along the Walsall Town Arm. This turns off at Walsall Junction, heading to the east into Walsall, and the main canal continues northwards, ascending 65 feet (20 m) through the Walsall Locks flight, numbered from 1 to 8 from the top downwards. The A454 Wolverhampton Road crosses between locks eight and seven, Birchills Street Bridge crosses between locks five and four, and Birchills Bridge crosses between locks two and one. An aqueduct crosses a dismantled railway line, part of the Wolverhampton and Walsall Railway, and Stephenson Avenue passes over the canal before it reaches Birchills Junction on the Wyrley and Essington Canal.

The canal starts at the Birmingham Level, descends 45 feet (14 m) to the Walsall Level, then rises 65 feet (20 m) to the Wolverhampton Level.

== History ==
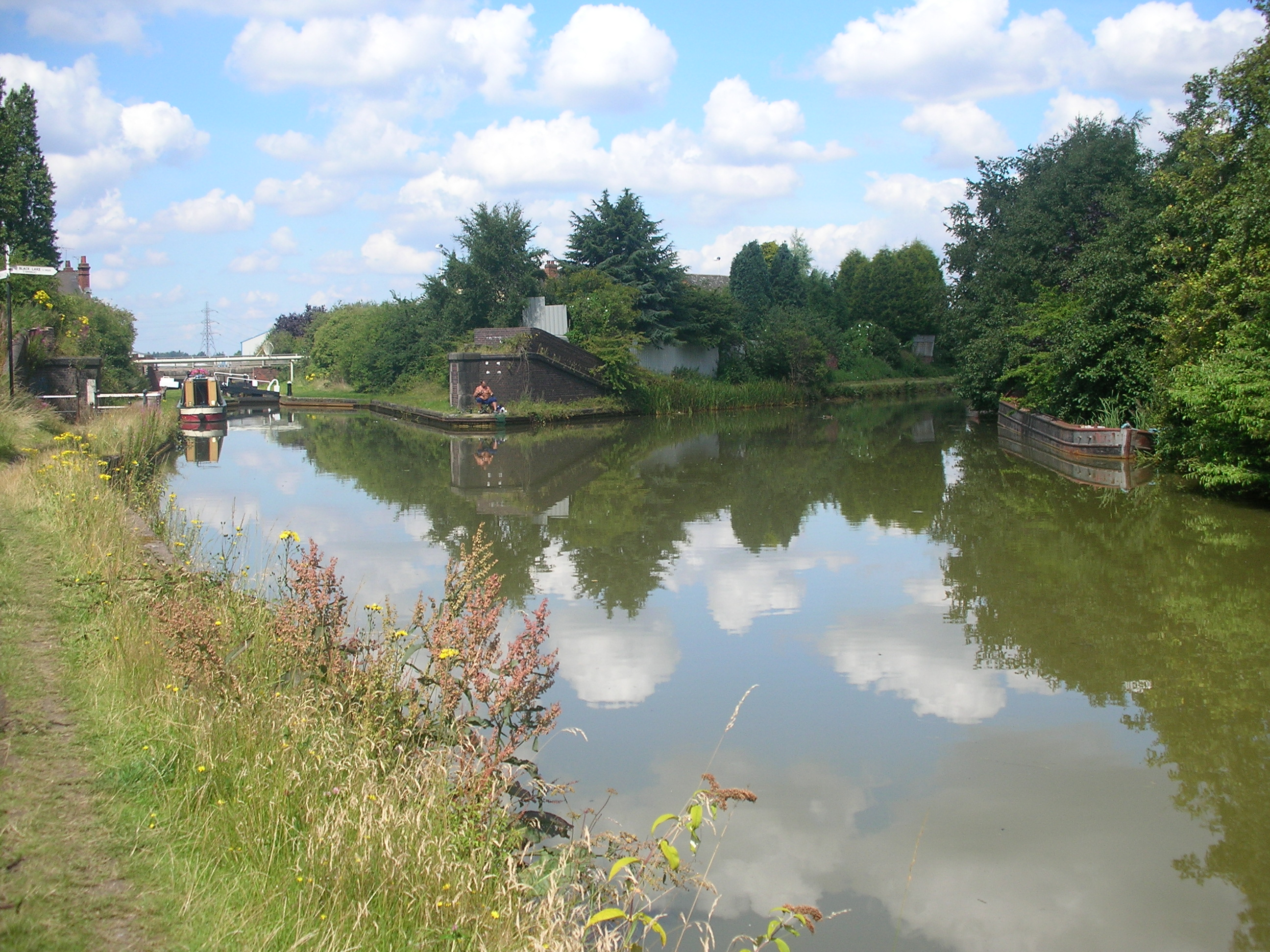
Ryders Green Junction is the southern terminus. The Wednesbury Old Canal turns to the right.

The Walsall Canal has a complex early history. When the Birmingham and Fazeley Canal was first promoted, it was intended to link the mineral resources of Wednesbury to the Coventry Canal and the Oxford Canal. A network of small canals in the Wednesbury area would serve the coal and ironstone mines, which were at a lower level than the Birmingham Canal, later the Birmingham Canal Navigations. The new canal was a competitor to the Birmingham Canal. It was supported by the Earl of Dudley, whose property near Broadwaters would benefit from its construction, and opposed by the Earl of Dartmouth, as the canal would cross his land. The Birmingham Canal proposed an alternative, involving branches from the Wednesbury Canal, a little further to the south.

The two companies had reached a compromise by the time a bill was submitted to Parliament. When the Birmingham and Fazeley Canal Act 1783 (23 Geo. 3. c. 92) was passed, it authorised the new company to build a canal between Fazeley and Aston, where it rose through a flight of locks to meet the Birmingham Canal at its eastern end. They could then use the BCN main line and the Wednesbury Canal to reach Ryder's Green, where they would build a detached part of their canal to reach Broadwaters and the mines in that area. The two companies amalgamated by the Birmingham and Fazeley Canal Act 1784 (24 Geo. 3. Sess. 2. c. 4), becoming the Birmingham Canal Navigations in 1794. John Smeaton was employed to be the engineer for both sections of the new canal, and John Pinkerton, a well-known canal contractor, was engaged to build the canal from Ryder's Green to Broadwaters, and then some of the main line from Fazeley Junction. This was the first section of what was to become the Walsall Canal. The 1783 act also authorised six collateral cuts from the Broadwaters Canal, including the Toll End and Gospel Oak branches.

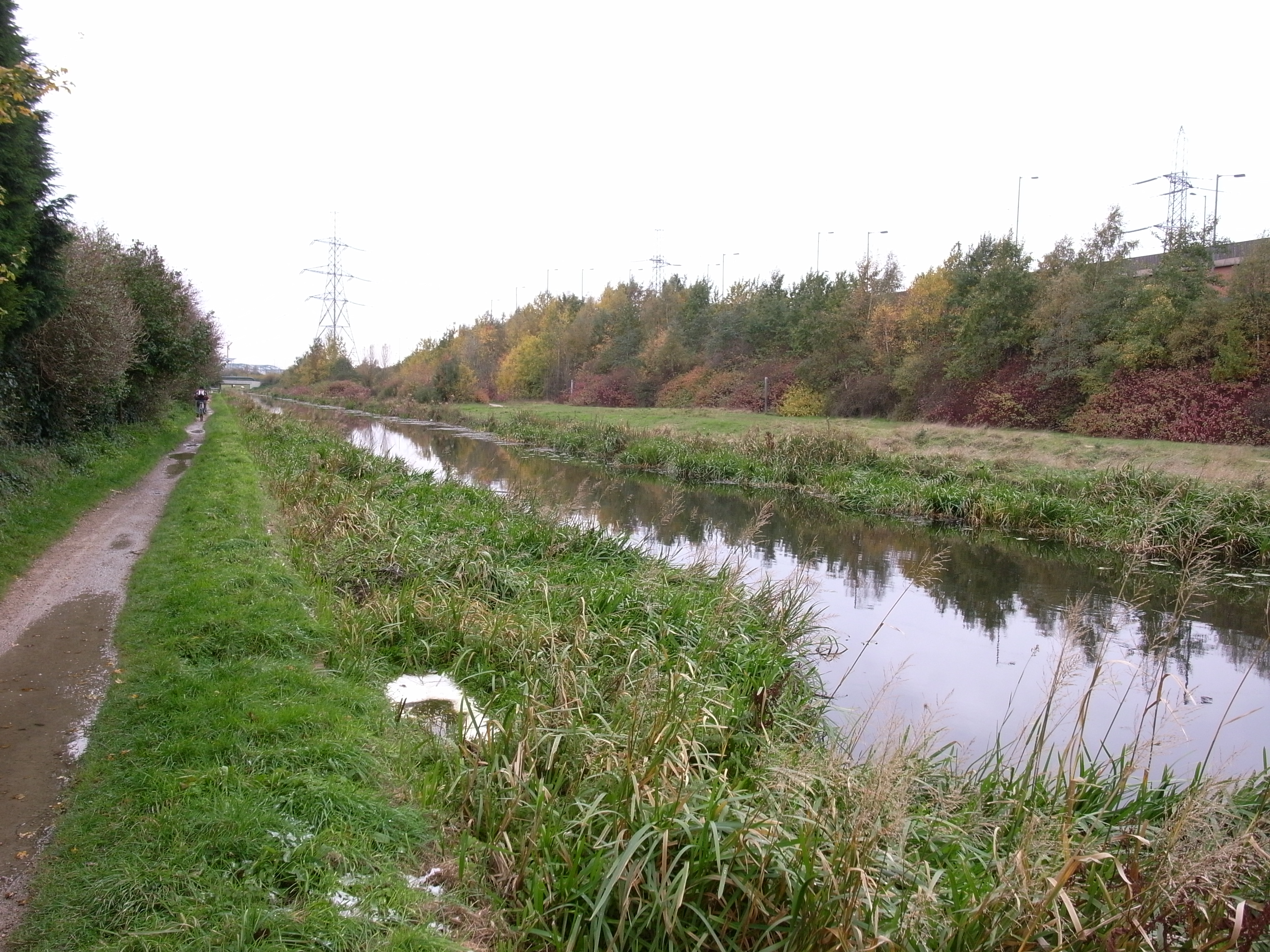
The Canal by Spine Road

At the time, Broadwaters was a series of pools surrounded by marshy ground. Eight locks were needed to reach the lower level of 406 feet (124 m) above ordnance datum, where the mines were located. Pinkerton's men built an aqueduct of brick and stone across the River Tame, to reach Great Bridge, Toll End and Leabrook. To supply the canal with water, they constructed a pumping engine, which had the added benefit that it drained the swampy ground, to enable it to be used for industry subsequently. The network of small canals would be built as new mines and iron works were developed. They included the Danks Branch, the Gospel Oak Branch, the Ocker Hill Tunnel Branch and the Toll End Branch. The Ocker Hill Tunnel was 5 feet (1.5 m) in diameter, lined with brick, which carried water to shafts where a steam pumping engine raised it to provide an extra water supply to the Birmingham Canal's 473-foot (144 m) Wolverhampton Level. Pinkerton completed the Broadwaters contract successfully.

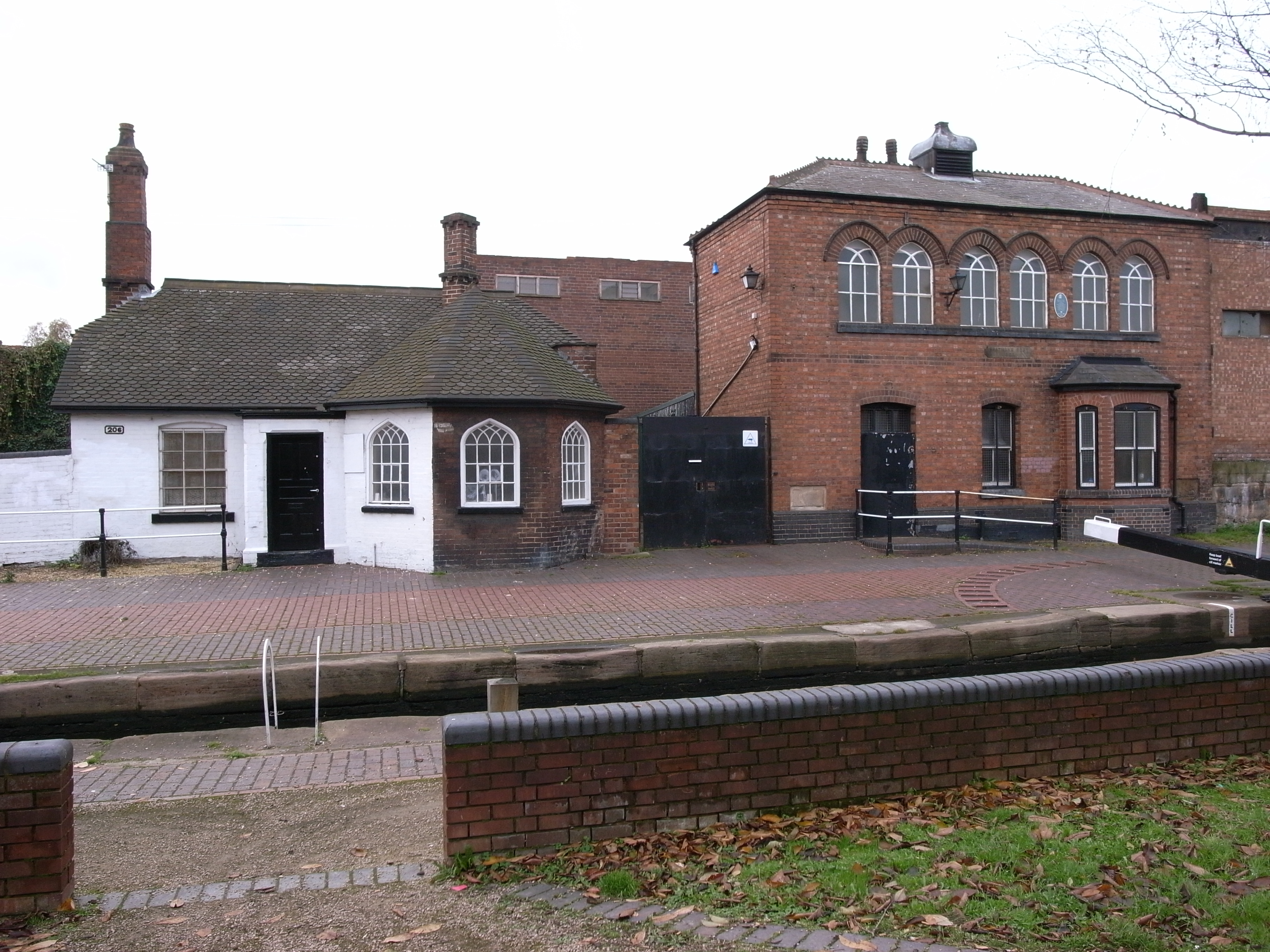
Walsall Locks toll office and Boaters Mission

Meanwhile the Birchills Branch of the Wyrley and Essington Canal reached Bloxwich Wharf to the north-west of Walsall by 1798. Much of this branch from Sneyd Junction was later subsumed into the new mainline of the Wyrley and Essington, when the canal was extended from Birchills Junction to Huddlesford Junction on the Birmingham and Fazeley Canal, authorised by the Wyrley and Essington Canal Act 1794 (34 Geo. 3. c. 25). The final 700 metres (2,300 ft) of the Birchills Branch towards Walsall was left as a stub, but was little used. By 1809, a writer reported that it was dammed off and had been drained for some years, after it broke through into Birchill Colliery Works.

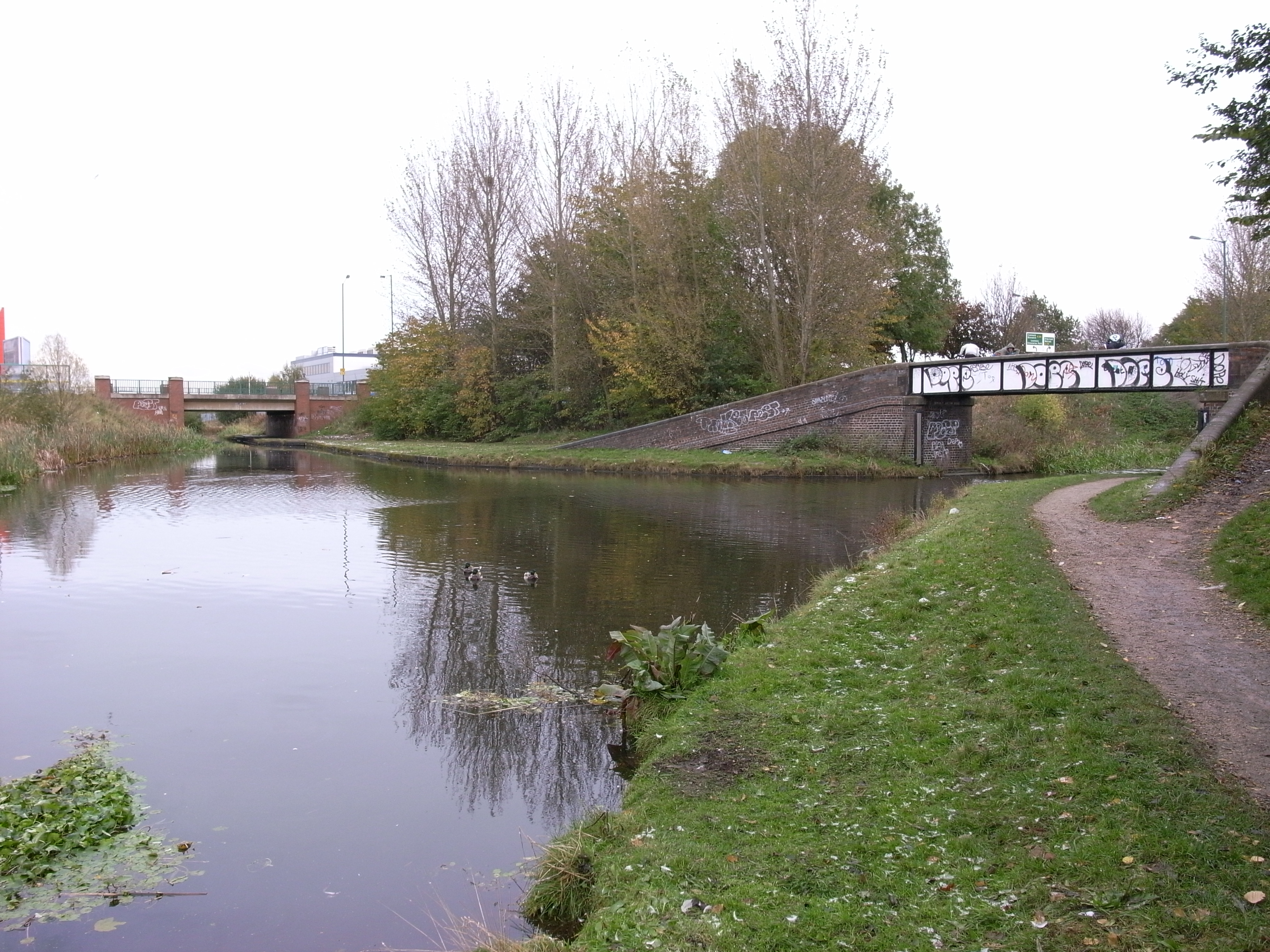
Birchills Junction at the north end of the canal. The Walsall Canal turns to the right, under the towpath bridge.

What was by then known as the Birmingham and Birmingham and Fazeley Canal Company, soon to be incorporated as the Birmingham Canal Navigations Company, was authorised by the combined company's sixth act of Parliament, the Birmingham Canal Navigation Act 1794 (34 Geo. 3. c. 87), of 17 April 1794 to extend the canal from Broadwaters to Walsall. It allowed the company to borrow £45,000, with which to construct the canal to Walsall and three branches to serve iron-stone and coal mines in the locality, all to be completed within three years. Construction began at Broadwaters and reached Darlaston by May 1798. The contractors were Jacob Twigg and Joseph Smith, and the work included a deep cutting to the north of Broadwaters. The whole area has subsequently been affected by subsidence from coal mining, and the scale of their task is now difficult to visualise. Twigg and Smith were engaged to complete the second phase of construction in April 1798, and had until 1 January 1799 to complete excavation of the channel to Walsall. They completed it in 1799, but the canal remained unfinished in 1800. The canal was mapped by John Snape (1737–1816) in 1808 and this was to be his last known map.

The small gap between the Birmingham Canal Navigations line to Walsall and the Wyrley and Essington Canal's Birchills Branch was of concern to businessmen to the north of Walsall, whose access to the south was by a very circuitous route. An independent canal to link the two was planned, but in 1839 the BCN agreed to build a connection. Thomas Townshend was engaged as the contractor for the Walsall Junction Canal in July 1840. It required eight locks to raise the canal by 65 feet (20 m) from the Walsall Level to the Wolverhampton Level of the Wyrley and Essington Canal. The link, which included refurbishment of the final 0.5 miles (0.8 km) of the Birchills Branch from Birchills Junction, was finished in March 1841, and this fourth phase of construction completed the through route and what is now known as the Walsall Canal.

=== Branches ===
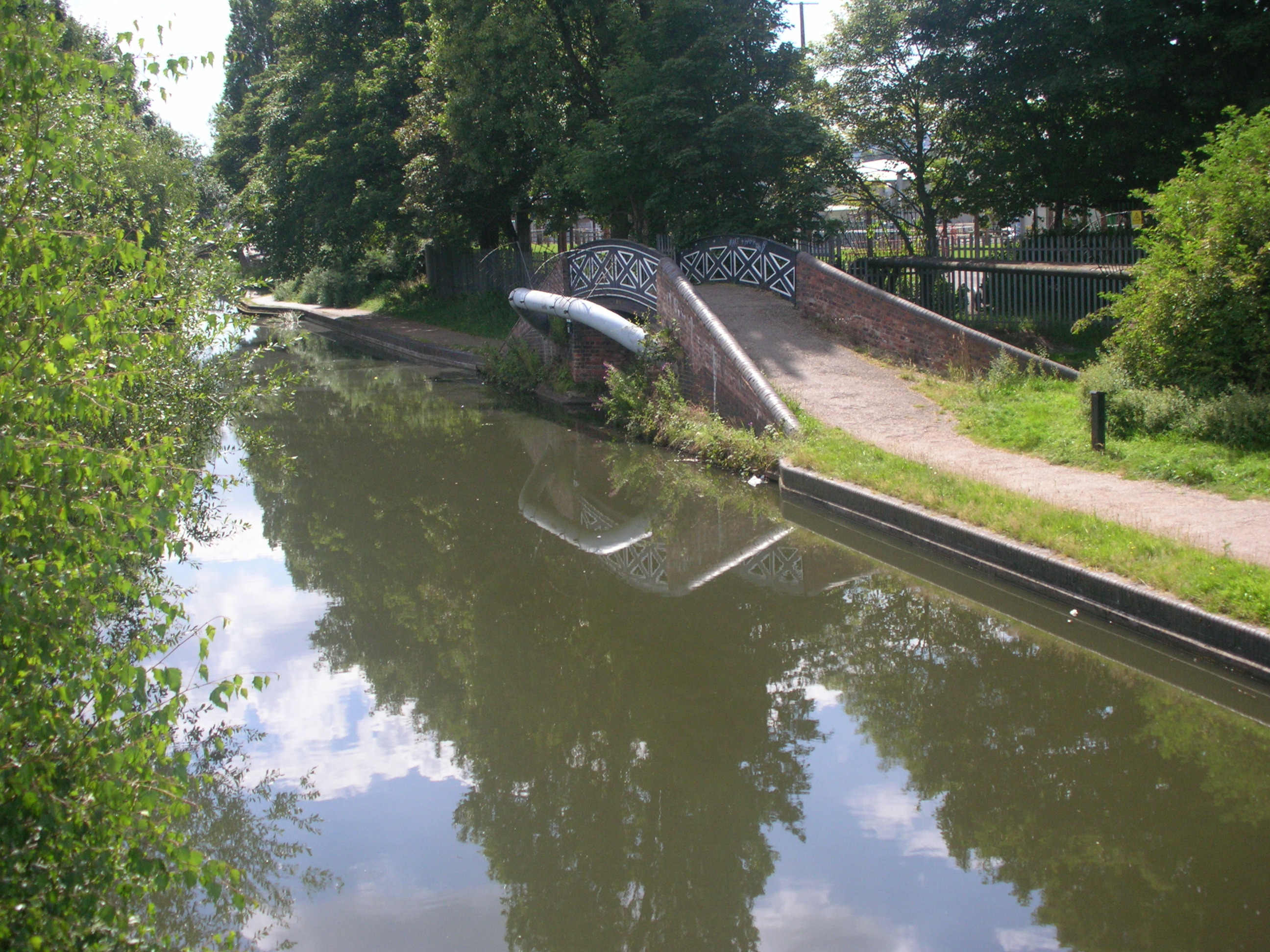
The Ocker Hill Tunnel Branch is now private

The canal had a number of branches and connections. The most southerly was the Haines Branch, which was 0.6 miles (1.0 km) long, and left the canal just below Ryders Green bottom lock. It passed under the Great Bridge Branch railway, Great Bridge Street, which carried a road with a street tramway, and Sheepwash Lane, where the towpath crossed from the east bank to the west. Immediately after the bridge, an aqueduct carried the canal over the River Tame, and a basin to the east served Canal Brick Works. A basin to the west served Denbign Hall Colliery, which was disused by 1904, and the branch ended at wharves for Pumphouse Brick Works. The colliery is now the site of the residential area of Horseley Heath, and much of Pumphouse Brick Works is a lake.

Just to the north of the South Staffordshire line railway bridge, the Danks Branch turned off to the east. It was 0.5 miles (0.8 km) long and was crossed by the railway line twice. In 1904 it ended at Danks Branch Wharf, on the south bank of the Tame Valley Canal. The towpath ran along the east bank. Most of the branch was closed as a result of the British Transport Commission Act 1954 (2 & 3 Eliz. 2. c. lv), At Toll End Junction, the Toll End Branch headed west. It was one of the six collateral cuts authorised by the Birmingham and Fazeley Canal Act 1783 (23 Geo. 3. c. 92). Work began in March 1800, with Jacob Twigg as contractor. The branch went towards Horseley, but was only connected to the collieries at Horseley by a private canal owned by Dixon, Amphlett and Bedford. It included locks, had been built between 1793 and 1794, and made an end-on connection with the Toll End Branch. John Rennie looked at connectivity on the Birmingham canal network in 1808, and proposed a link between Tipton on the main line and Toll End, to provide another link to the Walsall Canal. The project was known as the Toll End Communication, and land was bought in mid 1808, while the private canal was purchased in 1809. Mr Nock and others were contracted to build the locks and bridges, while Joseph Smith cut the channel. The work was virtually complete by 30 June 1809, when boats sailed from Tipton Green to the Walsall Canal. The link included seven locks.

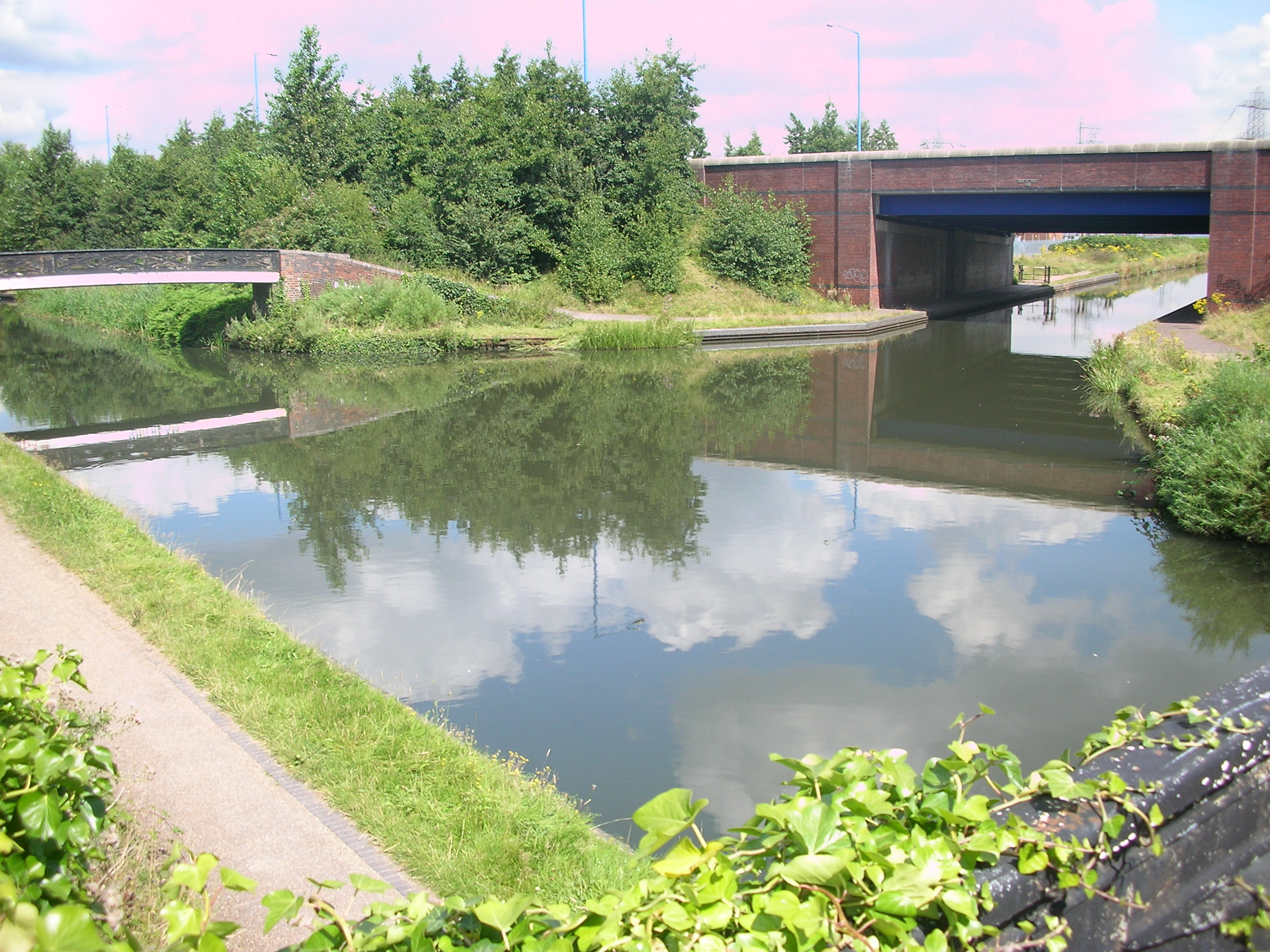
Tame Valley Junction is one end of the Tame Valley Canal

Further north, a basin served the Crown Brick Works, near Ocker Hill, and the Lower Ocker Hill Branch delivered water to Ocker Hill Tunnel, from where it was pumped to the Ocker Hill Branch. It reached the BCN Main Line by joining the Wednesbury Oak Loop at Summer Hill. The canal was joined by the Tame Valley Canal, which was built in the 1840s to provide a northern bypass for the overloaded Farmers Bridge Locks, at the eastern end of the BCN Main Line. The original act of Parliament, the Birmingham Canal Navigations Act 1839 (2 & 3 Vict. c. lxi) authorised a canal from Salford to join the Danks Branch, but was altered by the Wyrley and Essington Canal Navigation Act 1840 (3 & 4 Vict. c. xxiv), which changed the route. It opened on 14 February 1844.

The Gospel Oak Branch ran westwards to Gospel Oak, passing under Coppice Bridge near Willingsworth furnaces, where there were two basins on the north bank, and another on the south bank to serve a colliery. By 1904, the end of the branch was disused, as it was dammed off and shown as marsh. It opened in 1800, and was abandoned in 1954, authorised by the British Transport Commission Act 1954 (2 & 3 Eliz. 2. c. lv). Part of it is still in water, although not navigable. The rest of the 0.5-mile (0.8 km) branch has become a linear park, as far as the A4037 Gospel Oak Road. At one time, the Dumaresq Branch continued from the end of the Gospel Oak Branch, rising through two locks to reach Gospel Oak Ironworks. Opposite the junction with the Walsall Canal, one of two railway interchange basins remains, with attractive cast-iron bridges for users of the towpath.

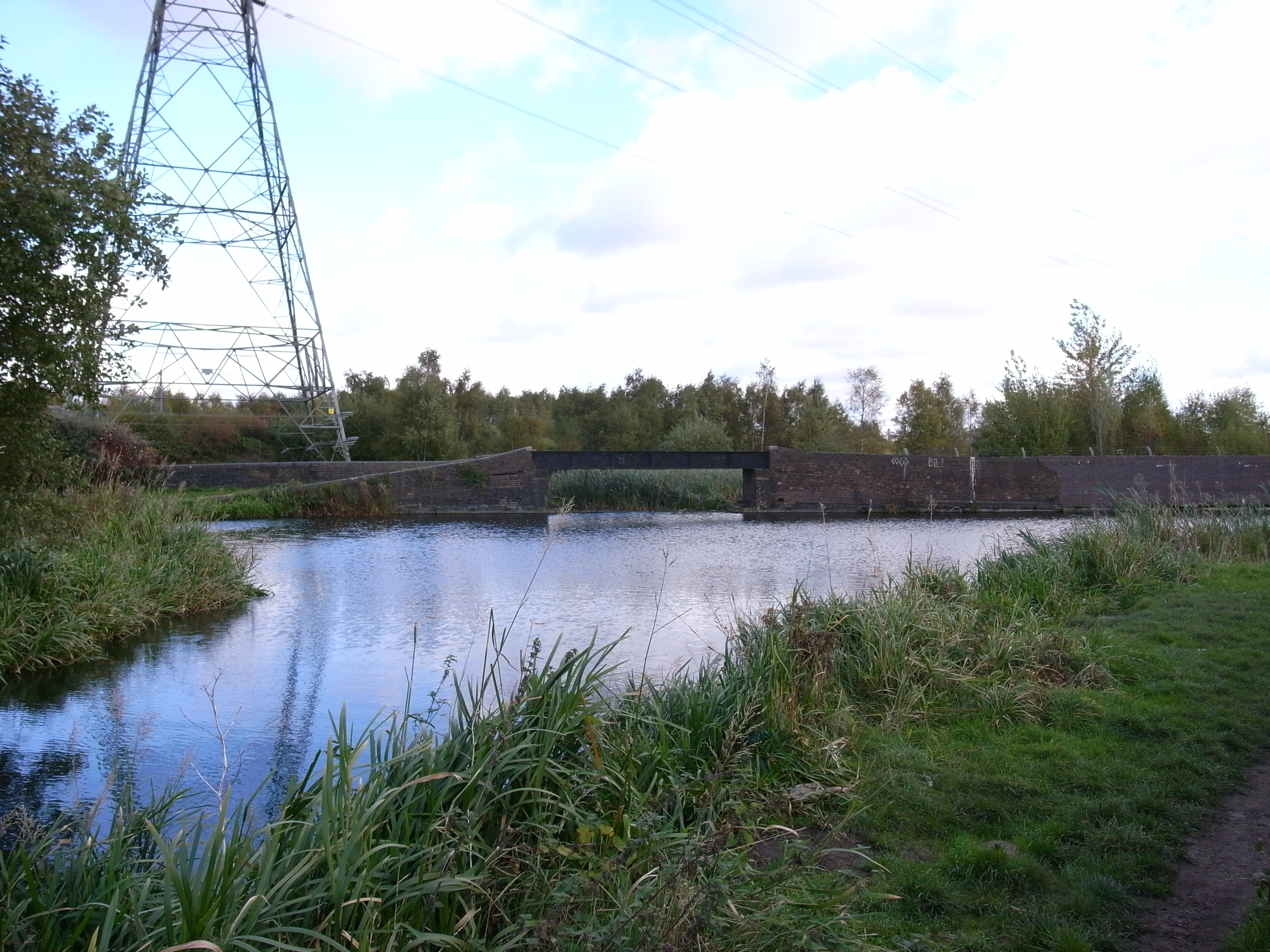
Gospel Oak Junction with the Walsall canal running left and right

A slight widening in the canal beyond the West Midlands Metro bridge marks where the Monway Branch started. Construction of the branch was completed by 1813. It ran to the east, passing under a towpath bridge and the Great Western Railway's Wednesbury Branch. A large basin served Monway iron and steel works and a chemical works. A branch turned to the south, and was crossed by two bridges and a drawbridge. It served Brunswick Works, which manufactured shafts, axletrees and wheels. Monway Works and Brunswick Works became part of the Patent Shaft steelworks, whose site eventually occupied both banks of the Walsall Canal, with the Monway Branch entirely within its boundaries. The branch was abandoned in 1957. It was about 0.37 miles (0.60 km) long. Opposite the entrance was a basin for a chemical works.

The branch had been used to deliver coal to some Lancashire boilers within the works, and as a source of water. Following closure, Patent Shaft bought the branch in the 1970s, as it made development of the site difficult. It was gradually drained and filled in. A reservoir was built on the site, which was supplied with water by a 2.5-foot (0.76 m) pipe from the Walsall Canal. The steelworks closed in 1980, and the buildings were demolished in 1986. Open cast mining was carried out in the early 1990s, and all traces of the Monway Branch were destroyed. The area is now covered with industrial buildings.

The Bradley Branch began as the Bradley Hall Extension, which started at Moorcroft Junction, and rose through three locks to reach Bradley Hall Colliery. The canal was approved in November 1794, and the mine owners were responsible for supplying the water for the locks. The branch was a replacement for some locks which were going to be built from the Gospel Oak Branch, but never were. It took the Birmingham Canal Navigations over two years of arbitration to ensure they were immune to legal action resulting from the change of plan. In 1849 the branch was extended by building another six locks, which linked it to the Gospel Oak Loop Line, part of the BCN old main line, which had been bypassed by a straighter cut through Coseley Tunnel. It was progressively abandoned between 1955 and 1961. Since 2013, there has been an active campaign to restore the branch, which will be known as the Bradley Canal. The top seven locks were filled in when the canal was abandoned, but are still largely intact.

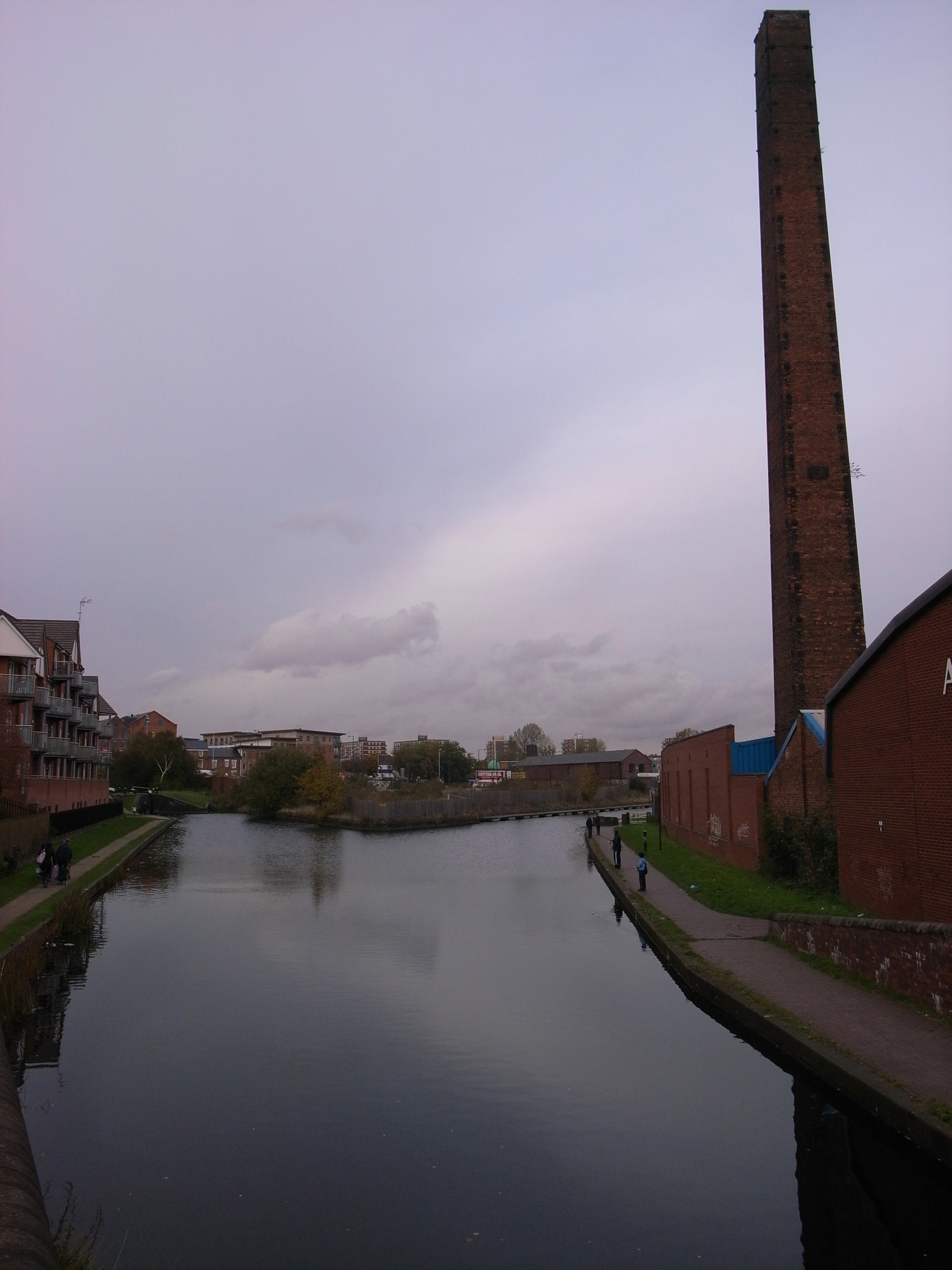
Walsall Junction where the Town Branch starts

The Bilston and Willenhall branches were constructed in the early 1800s, but by 1904 Bilston was shown as disused, and was disconnected from the canal. A short stub of Willenhall was still in water, connected by a tramway to a clay pit, beyond which it was dry. Both were formally abandoned under the British Transport Commission Act 1953 (1 & 2 Eliz. 2. c. xlii). The Anson Branch was surveyed by Thomas Telford in 1830, and Thomas Townsend started building it in March 1830. It was almost straight, with four bridges, and an aqueduct over the northern branch of the River Tame. It served Bentley furnaces and mines, to which it was connected by horse-drawn tramways. The Bentley Branch was started in 1840, to serve mines near Little London at Willenhall, but it was extended to the Wyrley and Essington Canal at Wednesfield, becoming the Bentley Canal and creating another through route. The Bentley Canal closed in 1961, and navigation stopped on the Anson Branch at around the same time. However, it was used to supply water to Birchills power station. The spent water was discharged into the Wolverhampton Level. Consequently, when the M6 motorway was constructed, maintenance craft still used the canal, and it was routed through a large culvert beneath junction 10 of the motorway.

== Points of interest ==
| Point | Coordinates (Links to map resources) | OS Grid Ref | Notes |
|---|---|---|---|
| Ryders Green Junction | 52.5228°N 2.0221°W | SO985916 | Wednesbury Old Canal |
| Toll End Junction | 52.5372°N 2.0356°W | SO976932 | Toll End Communication Canal |
| Ocker Hill Tunnel Branch | 52.5394°N 2.0357°W | SO976934 | |
| Tame Valley Junction (Doe Bank Junction) | 52.5400°N 2.0354°W | SO976935 | Tame Valley Canal |
| Gospel Oak Branch Junction | 52.5493°N 2.0370°W | SO975945 | |
| Moorcroft Junction | 52.5541°N 2.0411°W | SO972951 | Bradley Branch |
| Anson Branch Junction | 52.5775°N 2.0221°W | SO986977 | Anson Branch, leading to Bentley Canal |
| Walsall Junction | 52.5848°N 1.9928°W | SP005986 | Short branch to Walsall centre |
| Birchills Junction | 52.5987°N 1.9979°W | SK002000 | Wyrley and Essington Canal |

== See also ==
- Canals of the United Kingdom
- History of the British canal system

== Bibliography ==
- Broadbridge, S. R. (1974). The Birmingham Canal Navigations, Vol. 1 1768 - 1846. David & Charles. ISBN 978-0-7509-2077-3.
- Chester-Browne, Richard (1991). The Other Sixty Miles. Birmingham Canal Navigations Society.
- Cumberlidge, Jane (2009). Inland Waterways of Great Britain (8th Ed.). Imray Laurie Norie and Wilson. ISBN 978-1-84623-010-3.
- Hadfield, Charles (1985). The Canals of the West Midlands. David and Charles. ISBN 978-0-7153-8644-6.
- Nicholson (2006). Nicholson Guides Vol 2: Severn Avon and Birmingham. Harper Collins. ISBN 978-0-00-721110-4.
- Paget-Tomlinson, Edward (1993). The Illustrated History of Canal & River Navigations. Sheffield Academic Press. ISBN 978-1-85075-277-6.
- Pearson, Michael (1989). Canal Companion - Birmingham Canal Navigations. J. M. Pearson & Associates. ISBN 978-0-907864-49-3.
- Priestley, Joseph (1831). "Historical Account of the Navigable Rivers, Canals and Railways of Great Britain". Archived from the original on 3 March 2016.
- Shill, Ray (2005). Birmingham and the Black Country's Canalside Industries. Tempus Publishing. ISBN 978-0-7524-3262-5.
- Shill, Ray (2011a). "BCN Branches and Byeways: Ansons Branch". Boundary Post. Vol. 191. Birmingham Canal Navigations Society. Archived from the original on 1 October 2011.
- Shill, Ray (2011b). Silent Highways - The forgotten heritage of the Midlands canals. History Press. ISBN 978-0-7524-5842-7.
- Skempton, Sir Alec; et al. (2002). A Biographical Dictionary of Civil Engineers in Great Britain and Ireland: Vol 1: 1500 to 1830. Thomas Telford. ISBN 978-0-7277-2939-2.
- Tidy, Andy (Summer 2014). "Bradley Locks and Gospel Oak Canals walk (BCN)". The Boundary Post. Birmingham Canal Navigations Society.
