= Tipton Green and Toll End Canals =

Defunct canal system near Tipton, West Midlands

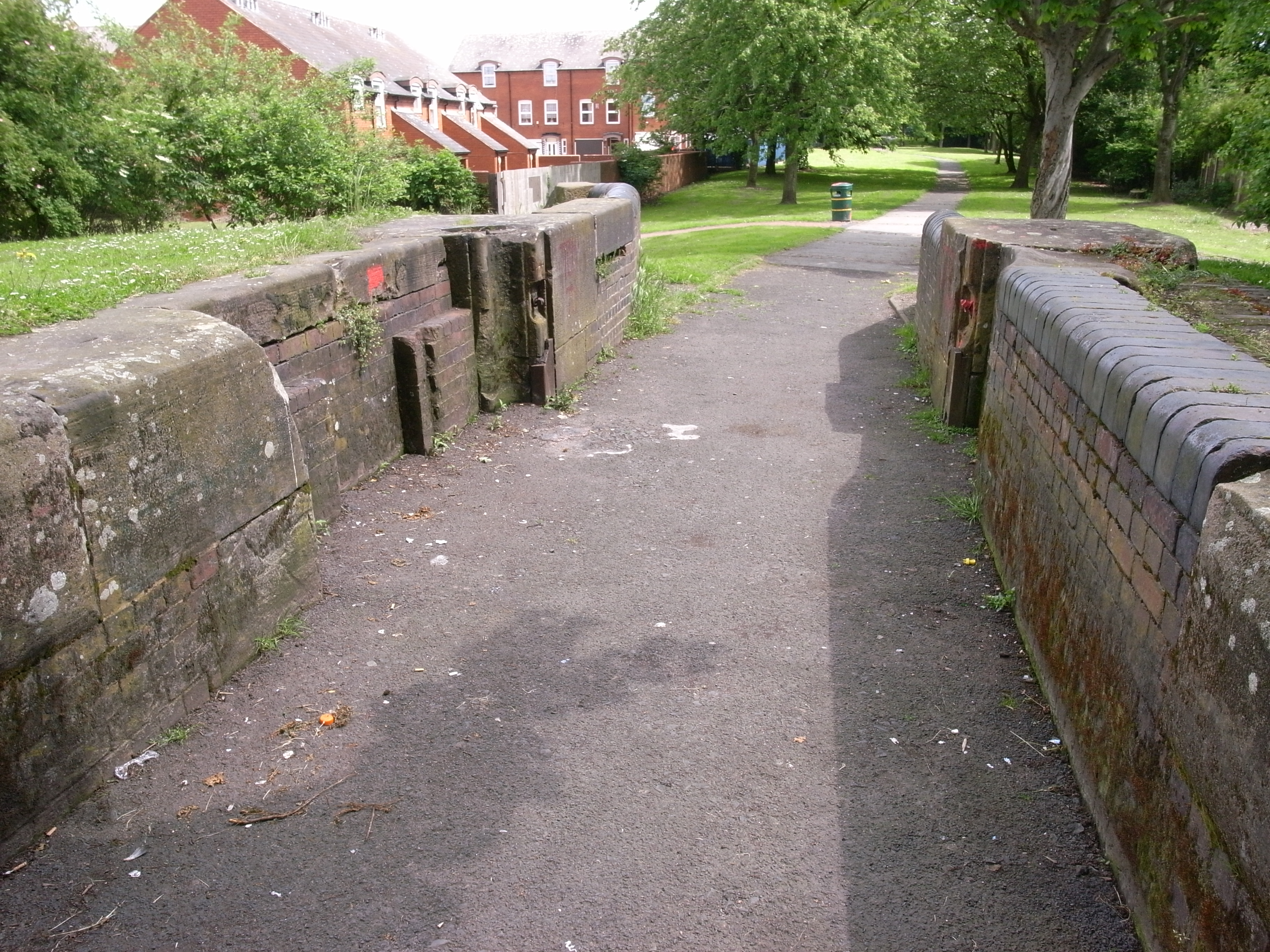
A derelict lock on the Tipton Green Canal, closed in the 1960s, now a public walkway.

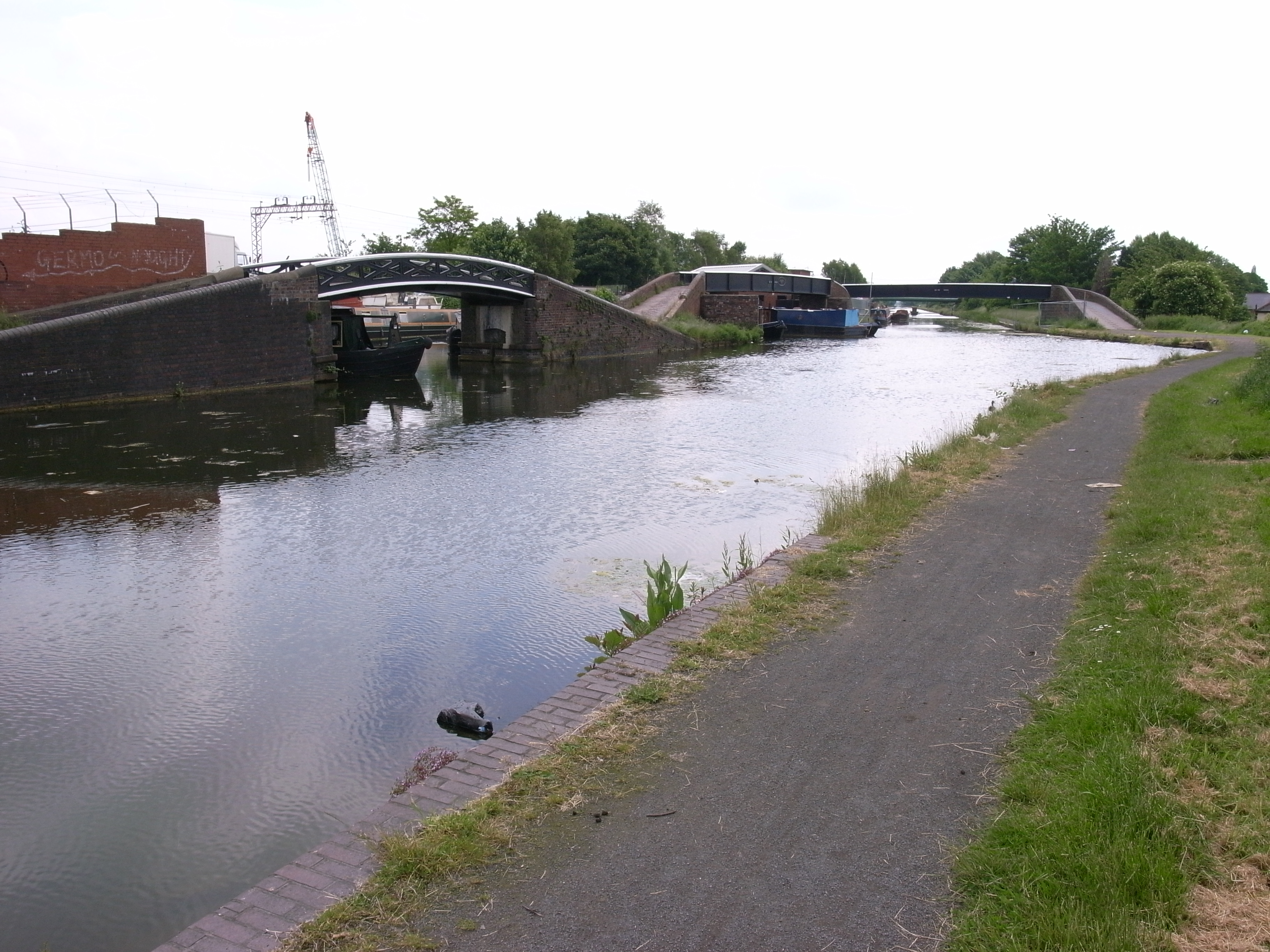
Watery Lane Junction. Caggy's Boatyard (started in the 1960s), within the start of the derelict Toll End Communication Canal (left and centre bridges).

The canals of the BCN around Tipton. Tipton Green and Toll End Branches running across the centre

The Tipton Green Branch and Toll End Branch (or Toll End Communication Canal) were narrow canals comprising part of the Birmingham Canal Navigations near Tipton (formerly in Staffordshire), West Midlands, England. These canals no longer exist.

== History ==
The Tipton Green Branch was completed around 1805 with 3 locks and a length of quarter of a mile.

The Toll End Branch was authorised by an act of Parliament in 1783 (along with the Birmingham and Fazeley Canal, Broadwaters Canal, and several other branches) to provide access to a proposed new coal mine. Work was started from the Broadwaters Canal (now part of the Walsall Canal) but halted in 1784 for eight years, being completed as a closed branch with two locks in 1801. In 1806 it was decided to extend this branch to the Tipton Green Branch with further locks, and in January 1809 the Toll End Communication Canal was completed making the length 1 ^{3}/_{8} miles.

In 1829 Thomas Telford's BCN New Main Line (Island Line)cut across the Tipton Green Canal, forming Watery Lane Junction, and creating a de facto Tipton Green Locks Branch of three locks and a Toll End Locks Branch of seven locks. From the later 20th century, Caggy's Boatyard occupied the basin at Watery Lane Junction.

The Horseley Ironworks operated their first foundry from a site between the two branches where many iron bridges, including the Engine Arm Aqueduct (1825), two roving bridges at Smethwick Junction (1828) and Galton Bridge, were cast.

Having suffered from a century or more of declining traffic due to the advent of trains and then motor vehicles, the Tipton Green Branch became disused in 1960, and the Toll End Branch in 1966, after some of the locks along the canal became immovable. The locks and canals were infilled in 1968. The Tipton Green locks were lined with houses which were built around the mid 19th century, but these were demolished around the time of the canal's closure.

The brick base of one lock on the Tipton Green canal, however, remains in existence, forming part of a public footpath that followed the course of the canal and was opened in about 1975.

One part of the Toll End canal has since been occupied by the car park of a factory on Toll End Road. There is also an "open" drain along the route of the canal at the back of Tipton Cemetery, but apart from this the canal has been almost obliterated. Almost all of the bridges are still in existence, apart from the bridge on Bridge Road which carried the road under the Toll End Canal. This bridge was replaced with a flat road several years after the canal was filled in.

== Route ==
Point	Coordinates (Links to map resources)	OS Grid Ref	Notes
Toll End Junction	52.5372°N 2.0356°W	SO976932	Walsall Canal
Toll End Road bridge	52.5367°N 2.0387°W	SO973932	
Lock 1	52.5353°N 2.0432°W	SO970930	
Lock 2	52.5348°N 2.0467°W	SO968930	
Northern terminus of Tipton Green Canal	52.5352°N 2.0509°W	SO965930	
Upper Church Lane bridge on Tipton Green Canal	52.5325°N 2.0557°W	SO962927	
Horseley Ironworks (original site)	52.5338°N 2.0517°W	SO964929	
Lock 3	52.5316°N 2.0545°W	SO963926	
Lock 4	52.5316°N 2.0556°W	SO962926	
Junction with Tipton Green Canal	52.5319°N 2.0565°W	SO961927	
Lock 5	52.5304°N 2.0593°W	SO959925	(Tipton Green Canal)
Lock 6	52.5294°N 2.0620°W	SO957924	under Alexander Road bridge (Tipton Green Canal)
Basin	52.5296°N 2.0628°W	SO957924	
Lock 7	52.5291°N 2.0633°W	SO957924	(Tipton Green Canal)
Watery Lane Junction	52.5289°N 2.0638°W	SO956923	BCN New Main Line (Island Line)
Lock 8	52.5291°N 2.0633°W	SO957924	(Tipton Green Canal)
Lock 9	52.5278°N 2.0688°W	SO953922	(Tipton Green Canal)
Lock 10	52.5275°N 2.0699°W	SO952922	under Elliotts Road bridge (Tipton Green Canal)
Tipton Green Junction	52.5275°N 2.0701°W	SO952922	BCN Old Main Line (Tipton Green Canal)

== See also ==
- Canals of the United Kingdom
- History of the British canal system
