= Toll End =

Residential area in Tipton, England

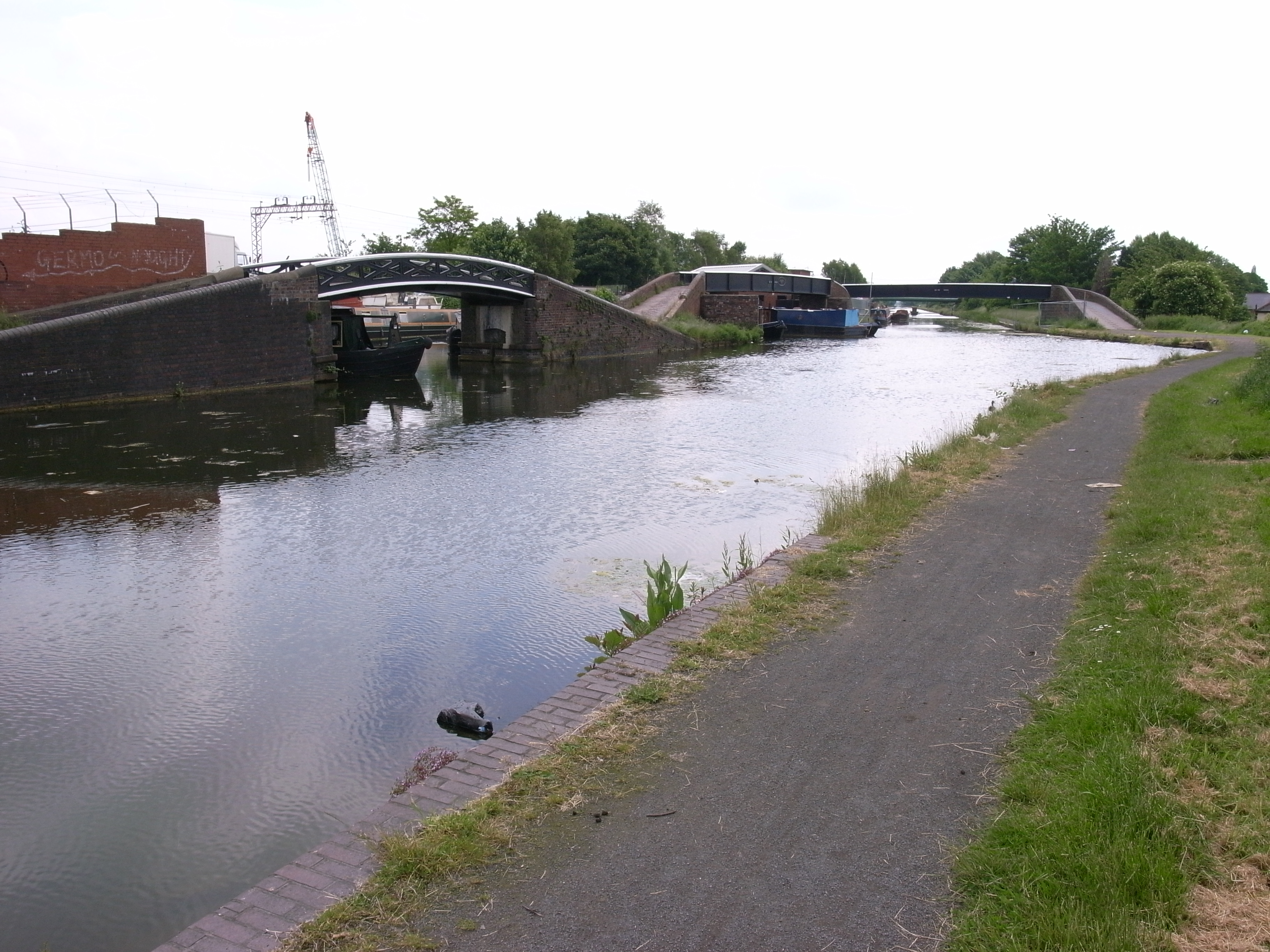
Watery Lane Junction. Caggy's Boatyard (started in the 1960s), within the start of the derelict Toll End Communication Canal (left and centre bridges).

Toll End is a residential area of Tipton in the West Midlands of England. It was developed during the 19th century during the Industrial Revolution which saw previously rural Tipton developed as one of the most prolific manufacturing and mining towns in the country. It is situated on the former A461 road which connects Dudley to Walsall.

Several factories were built around Toll End as the area developed during Victorian times, and many houses were built to accommodate the workers. Private and council housing saw the area further expand between 1920 and 1970.

The main road through Toll End - Toll End Road - is no longer part of the main Dudley to Walsall route following the completion of the Black Country Spine Road in 1995.

But the biggest change around Toll End has no doubt been the de-industrialisation of the area since the 1970s. Most of the local industry has gone due to a de-industrialisation of the Black Country, although the offices and works of Tipton Division of the former Midlands Electricity Board on Toll End Road continue to be used by its successors, Avon Energy, then GPU Power Distribution, then Aquila Networks, then Central Networks and now Western Power distribution since the buildings were constructed in about 1960.

Much of the land around Toll End previously occupied by industry has been developed for modern housing, with a number of substantial private housing developments having taken place since 1990.

Despite the extensive residential developments around Toll End in the last 20 years, many older buildings still remain, including dozens of turn-of-the-20th century terraced houses on the main Toll End Road.

== Tipton Green and Toll End Canals ==
In 1806 it was decided to extend this branch to the Tipton Green Branch of the Tipton Green and Toll End Canals., with further locks, and in January 1809 the Toll End Communication Canal was completed making the length 1 ^{3}/_{8} miles.

The Tipton Green Branch became disused in 1960, and the Toll End Branch in 1966. The locks and canals were infilled soon after closure and a pedestrian walkway was erected along the path of the Tipton Green Branch during the 1970s. The level crossing in Tipton which carried the B4517 road over the West Coast Main Line has been replaced by a road tunnel which permanently severs the Tipton Green canal alignment from the Birmingham Main Line.

== Eagle Rail Crossing ==
Eagle Rail Crossing - a level crossing situated in Eagle Lane on the border with West Bromwich - was a significant local landmark in Toll End. It was opened in 1850 on the completion of the South Staffordshire Line between Stourbridge and Walsall.

The line at Eagle Rail Crossing closed on 19 March 1993 and two years later a four-span "viaduct" style roadbridge was constructed above road level to carry the new Spine Road. The signal box survived until it was damaged by arsonists in 1996. The construction of the roadbridge over Eagle Crossing saw it being closed to motor vehicles, although it is still passable for pedestrians.

Eagle Lane was also home to a factory owned by Birmingham-based firm JF Ratcliff metals, built in the late 19th century and employing hundreds of workers until its closure in December 1989. Demolition took place shortly after closure and within four years the site was occupied by a private housing estate, one of the roads being called Ratcliff Way.

== See also ==
- npower UK
