= Wednesbury Oak Loop =

Canal in the West Midlands, England

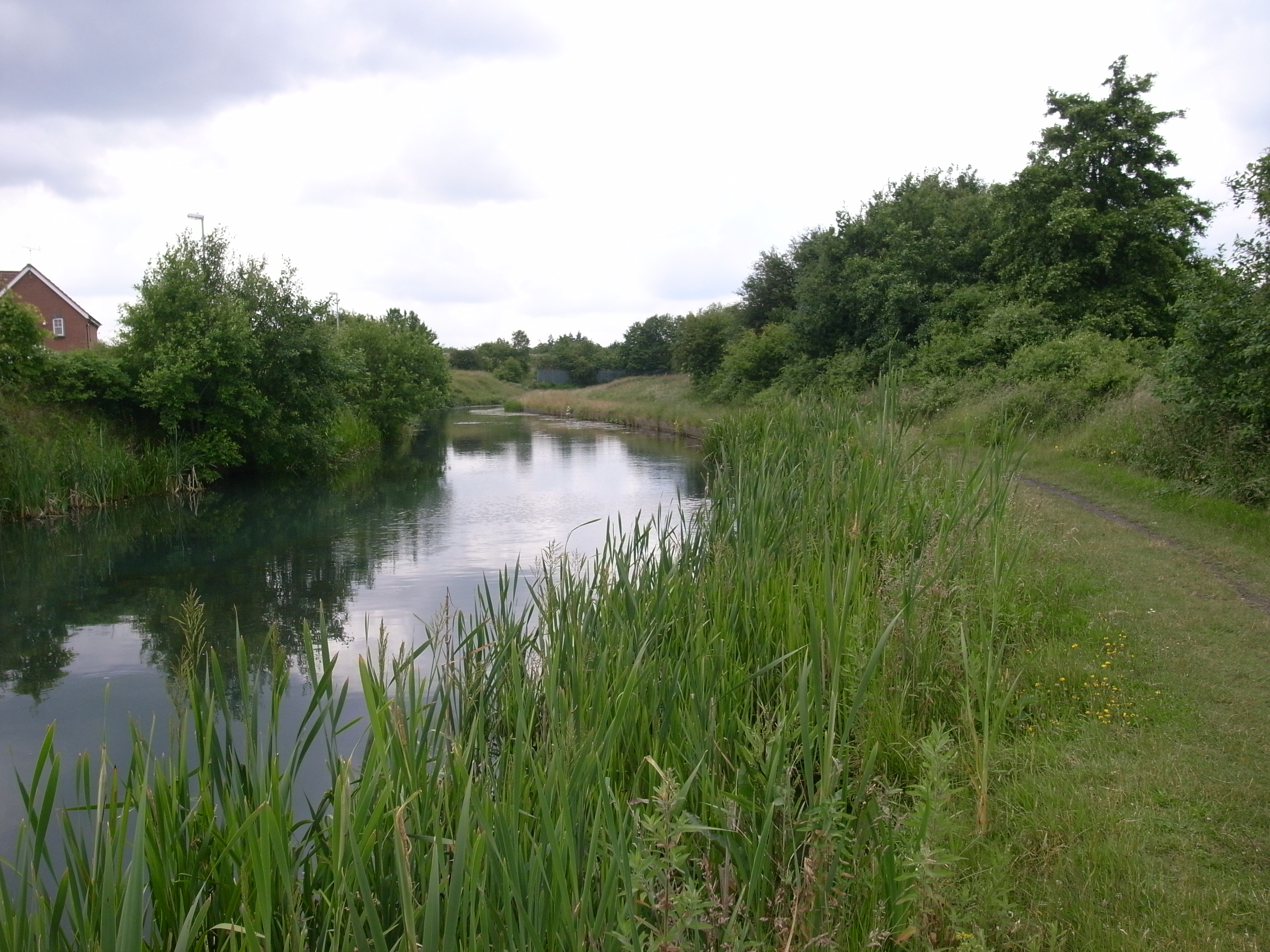
- A rural scene on the Wednesbury Oak Loop
- Interactive map of Wednesbury Oak Loop

Specifications
- Status: Part open, Part destroyed
- Navigation authority: Canal and River Trust

History
- Principal engineer: James Brindley
- Date of act: 1768
- Date of first use: 1772
- Date completed: 1837
- Date closed: 1954

Geography
- Start point: Bloomfield Junction
- End point: Deepfields Junction
- Branch of: Birmingham Canal Navigations

The Wednesbury Oak Loop, sometimes known as the Bradley Arm, is a canal in the West Midlands, England. It is part of the Birmingham Canal Navigations (BCN), and was originally part of James Brindley's main line, but became a loop when Thomas Telford's improvements of the 1830s bypassed it by the construction of the Coseley Tunnel. The south-eastern end of the loop was closed and in parts built over, following the designation of the entire loop as "abandoned" in 1954, including the section which was filled in at the beginning of the 1960s to make way for the Glebefields Estate in Tipton.

== History ==
The Wednesbury Oak Loop was one of the loops in the original, meandering Birmingham Canal, later called the BCN Main Line, which was built by James Brindley after the company obtained an Act of Parliament in 1768. A line from coal mines at Wednesbury to central Birmingham was opened in 1769, with both ends built on the 453-foot (138 m) contour, and a summit in the middle, which rose to 491 feet (150 m) to pass over high ground at Smethwick. This created a lucrative coal trade, and the rest of the main line, which passed around the Wednesbury Oak Loop, was started in 1770. This section was built to follow the 473-foot (144 m) contour, leaving the first section half-way up the flight of six locks at Spon Lane. It too faced high ground at Coseley, but in this case, a circuitous route was followed to avoid a change in level and any locks. The line ended with a flight of twenty locks at Wolverhampton, later increased by one, to drop the canal down to meet the Staffordshire and Worcestershire Canal at Aldersley Junction, and this section of the main line opened on 21 September 1772. There was some suggestion at the time that Brindley had added extra meanders to increase the length of the canal, and therefore the tolls that could be charged, but this was strenuously denied in a newspaper advertisement placed by Brindley on 14 January 1771, where he argued that the winding route was necessary to ensure that the most customers could be served.

In 1824, Thomas Telford was asked to improve the main line, which he did by straightening and widening parts of it, and creating a new main line from Tipton to Smethwick. Telford was one of a later generation of canal engineers, who used cuttings and embankments to allow his canals to follow as direct a route as possible, and the long winding loop around Wednesbury Oak was an obvious target for removal. Some work was done on a cutting between Bloomfield and Deepfields, but work then stopped. With the opening of the Birmingham and Liverpool Junction Canal imminent in 1834, and the prospect of much more trade on the western section of the canal, a new Act of Parliament was obtained in 1835 to authorise a 360-yard (330 m) tunnel through the hill at Coseley. It would have a towpath on both sides of the canal, and opened on 6 November 1837. The route through Wednesbury Oak now became the Wednesbury Oak Loop, as it was considerably longer than the new tunnel and its cut. The loop met the new cut at Deepfields Junction to the north-west of the tunnel, which marks the northern limit of Telford's route change, and Bloomfield Junction to the south-east, which had railway wharves for the Great Western Railway (GWR) and London and North Western Railway (LNWR). Telford's improvements reduced the length of the main line by one third, from 22.5 miles (36.2 km) to 15.5 miles (24.9 km), a large part of the reduction being the bypassing of the Wednesbury Oak Loop.

The Ocker Hill Branch, for which provision was made in the same 1768 Act of Parliament which authorised the Birmingham Canal and Wednesbury Canal, was a branch from the Wednesbury Oak Loop. It was 0.6 miles (0.97 km) long, and opened in 1774. Following the successful installation of Boulton and Watt steam engines to pump water up the Spon Lane locks in 1778 and the Smethwick locks in 1779, a similar installation was planned for the Ocker Hill Branch. Water would be fed through a tunnel from the 408-foot (124 m) Broadwaters Level, which was under construction at the time and later became part of the Walsall Canal. The Ocker Hill Tunnel Branch would end at a sump, from which water would be pumped to feed the 473-foot (144 m) Wolverhampton Level of the Birmingham Canal Navigations. There were five steam engines at the pumping station in 1851. The tunnel needed to be repaired on a number of occasions, as it was affected by mining subsidence, but remained in use until it was designated as 'abandoned' in 1954 and was filled in at the start of the 1960s, with part of the infilled section being developed as the Glebefields housing estate in Tipton.

In 1849 the Bradley Locks Branch opened, connecting the loop with the Walsall Canal. It was one of a number of connecting links made following the amalgamation of the Wyrley and Essington Canal and the Birmingham Canal Navigations in 1840. After it was closed in 1961, most of it was simply covered up, and became part of a linear park. The Birmingham Canal Navigations Society have suggested it as a possible candidate for restoration, since most of the structures are still in situ, and the only significant obstacle would be Tup Street Bridge on the Wednesbury Oak Loop which crosses the canal immediately after the Canal & River Trust.

In 1954, along with many other branches and canals in the BCN, much of the Wednesbury Oak Loop was given 'abandoned' status and was subsequently filled in and partly built over, beginning with the section of the canal which was filled in around 1961 to make way for the Glebefields Estate. The southern section around Bloomfield Road was filled in about a decade later, with the aqueduct over Central Avenue (built in the 1930s) being demolished at this time. The northern stretch, also sometimes known today as the Bradley Arm (not to be confused with the Bradley Branch or Bradley Locks Branch), remains navigable to the Canal & River Trust (CRT) workshops built at Bradley in 1960. Next to the CRT workshops is the modern Bradley pumping station which draws water from flooded coal mines into the Wolverhampton Level.

== Route ==
Hover mouse pointer over a canal junction to see its name

Map of Wednesbury Oak Loop (shown in pink), an original part of James Brindley's Birmingham Canal, and its modern neighbours. The canal as it stands today is shown as a solid line.

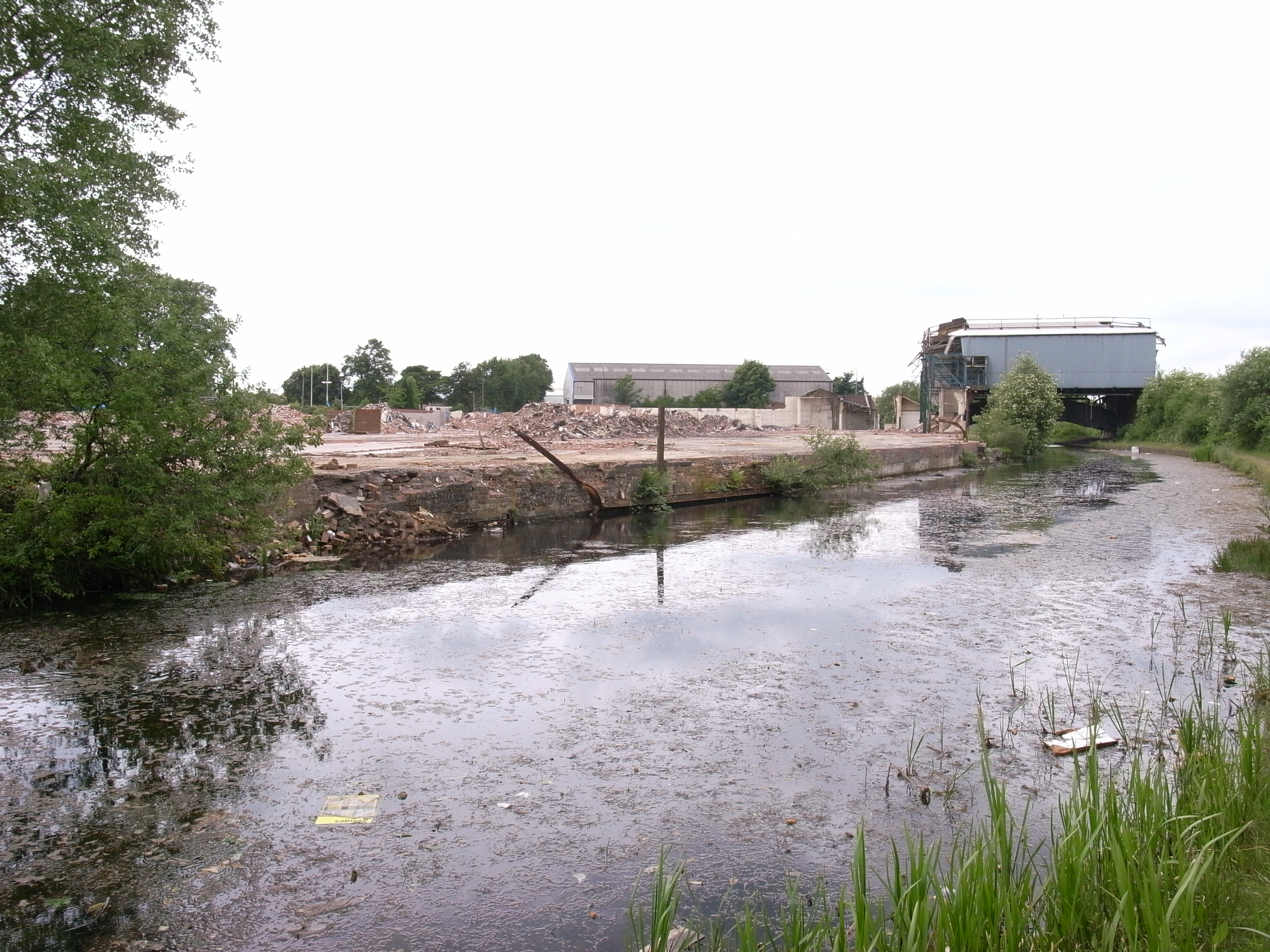
An industrial scene on the Wednesbury Oak Loop, less than a mile from the rural scene

From Deepfields Junction, the canal passes under a London, Midland and Scottish Railway bridge, after which there was a basin to the north, which served Deepfields Colliery Pit No. 4 in 1887. It was partially filled in between 1938 and 1967, and is now gone. Beyond it was Deepfields Bridge, carrying Ladymoor Road over the canal. Then the canal turned to the north-east on a very wide bend, with a basin to the south, serving Deepfields Works, which was manufacturing sheet iron in 1887. By 1919, the works had gone and just a small section of the basin remained. The whole area was covered by Deepfields colliery, which had also engulfed a boat building yard situated by the next bend in 1887 but gone by 1903. By the next bend, there were three basins, the first of which is still there, while the next two had been filled in by 1967. Highfields Bridge carries Highfields Road, and then there was a basin, which still exists and which provides a winding point. After the next bend there is a much wider section, which acted as a basin and is the final winding point on the branch outside of the hours when the Canal & River Trust depot is open.

Opposite it, Capponfield Furnaces was served by a basin which lasted until after 1938, although the works was still active in 1967. The Oxford, Worcester and Wolverhampton Railway crossed next, with a basin on the north bank on either side of the bridge, the second serving Capponfield Iron Works. Two more basins were located on the south bank, and then a large rectangular basin served Barbor's Field Furnaces on the north bank. Only the second of the two to the south remained in 1967, the first having been covered by a refuse tip. Banks Bridge was located where Dudley Street crossed, and the line followed a big sweeping arc, to turn to the south. There were two more basins on the outside of the arc, and one inside, to serve Bradley Field Iron Works. Pothouse Bridge carries Salop Road over the canal, and then another basin served the Regent Iron Works.

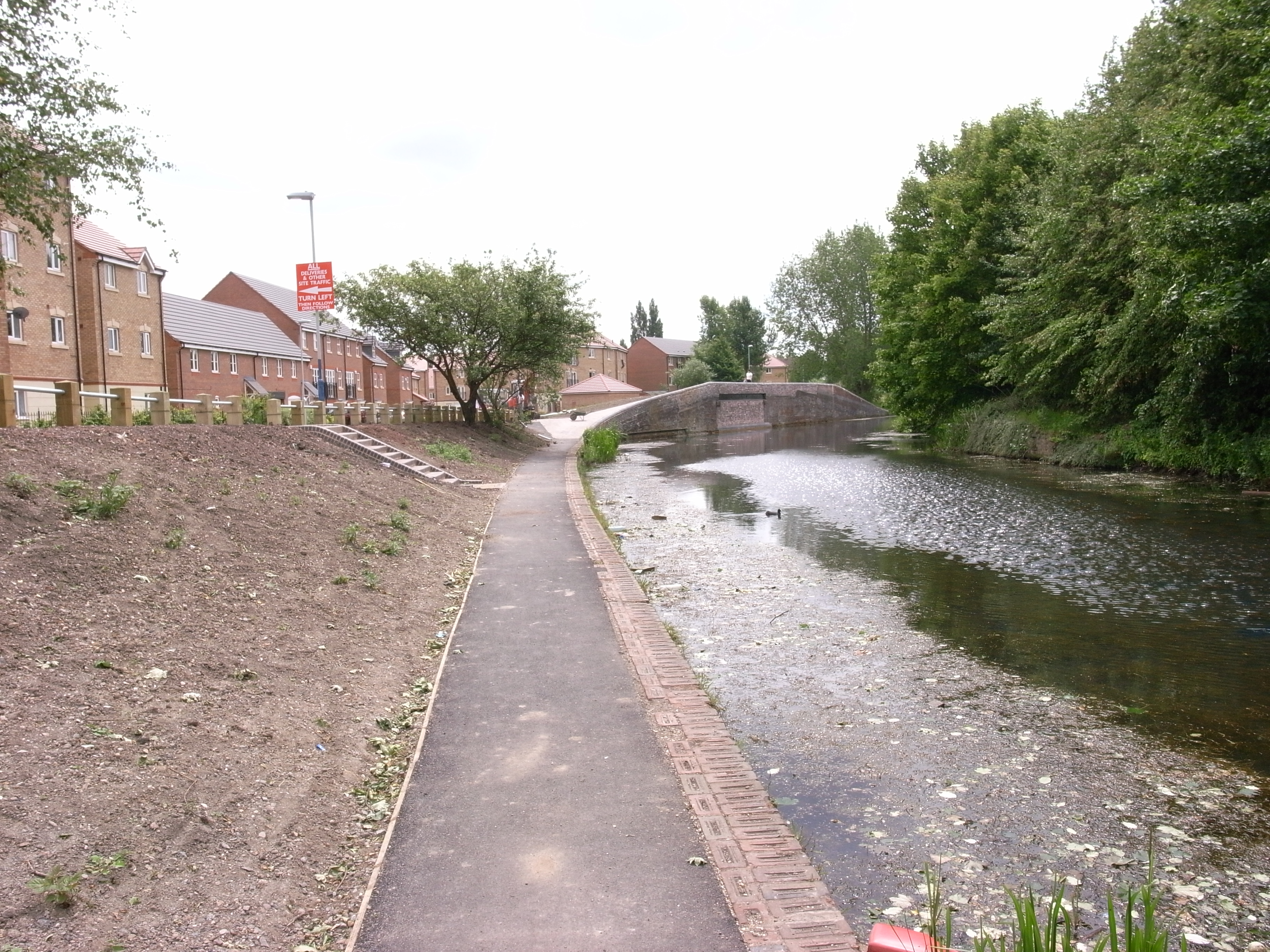
Modern housing over an in-filled loop

The old line of the canal swung in a big loop to the east of the current line, passing Britannia and Bradley Hall Works, both of which made bar iron, and an unnamed chemical works. The loop ended where the modern Canal & River Trust depot is located. A new line, which is now the only line, was cut across the neck of the loop some time before 1887. Bradley Pumping Engine was located where they rejoined. By 1938, most of the loop, apart from the basin near the pumping engine, was dry. Tup Street Bridge carried Cross Street over the canal just beyond the present end of the watered section. A small basin to the west served Batman's Hill Iron Works, and then there was another large loop, this time to the west, its course roughly corresponding to the borders of Weddell Wynd Community Woodland. A small basin served a coal pit within the loop, which had gone by 1903, and a much longer one branched westwards from the loop to serve Wednesbury Oak Colliery, with a branch which headed northwards to Hardingsfield Colliery. Half of the northern branch had gone by 1903, and the entire basin was dry by 1919.

At some time prior to the opening of the Bradley Locks Branch in 1849, a straight cut had been made across the neck of the loop, and the new branch connected to it. Just beyond the end of the cut, a network of basins headed eastwards, to serve the Wednesbury Oak Iron Works, and some furnaces that produced pig iron. A tramway crossed, a basin served Schoolfields Colliery No 2, already disused by 1887, and a railway crossed. Beyond it, Schoolfields Colliery No 3 and its basin were also disused by this date, although the No 5 Colliery was operational, to the east of the canal, and its basin was linked to two tramways in 1903, but had gone by 1938. A modern school occupies the site of the basin. After another large bend, Gospel Oak Iron Works had a large basin with a northern branch, and Summer Hill Iron Works had a smaller basin. The canal passed round the village of Summer Hill in a large loop to the east, from which the Ocker Hill Branch left, and a basin served Hope Colliery and another served Hope Iron Works. Both had gone by 1904, when the whole area had become Moat Colliery.

Church Lane crossed the canal to the south-west of Summer Hill. After more sweeping bends, two basins served old clay pits to the north of the canal, and two more served Tipton Green Iron Furnaces to the south. A tramway bridge, three railway bridges, and a series of basins completed the final section, before it rejoined the cut from Coseley Tunnel. Most of the basins had gone by 1920.

Point	Coordinates (Links to map resources)	OS Grid Ref	Notes
Deepfields Junction	52.5528°N 2.0904°W	SO938950	BCN Main Line
Pothouse Bridge Junction	52.5585°N 2.0662°W	SO955956	Loxdale Street
Current terminus	52.5536°N 2.0661°W	SO955951	Canal & River Trust workshops
Tup Street Bridge	52.5528°N 2.0654°W	SO955950	
Ocker Hill Branch junction	52.5385°N 2.0564°W	SO961934	(dry - estimated from map)
Bloomfield Junction	52.5351°N 2.0795°W	SO946930	(dry) - Wednesbury Oak Loop originally rejoined the BCN Main Line

== See also ==
- Canals of the United Kingdom
- History of the British canal system

== Bibliography ==
- Broadbridge, S. R. (1974). The Birmingham Canal Navigations, Vol. 1 1768 - 1846. David & Charles. ISBN 978-0-7509-2077-3.
- Hadfield, Charles (1985). The Canals of the West Midlands. David and Charles. ISBN 978-0-7153-8644-6.
- Nicholson (2006). Nicholson Guide Vol 2: Severn, Avon & Birmingham. Harper Collins. ISBN 978-0-00-721110-4.
- Pearson, Michael (1989). Canal Companion - Birmingham Canal Navigations. J. M. Pearson & Associates. ISBN 978-0-907864-49-3.
- White, William (1851). History, Gazetteer and Directory of Staffordshire. Sheffield. Archived from the original on 28 December 2020.
