= Bumble Hole Branch Canal =

Canal in West Midlands, England

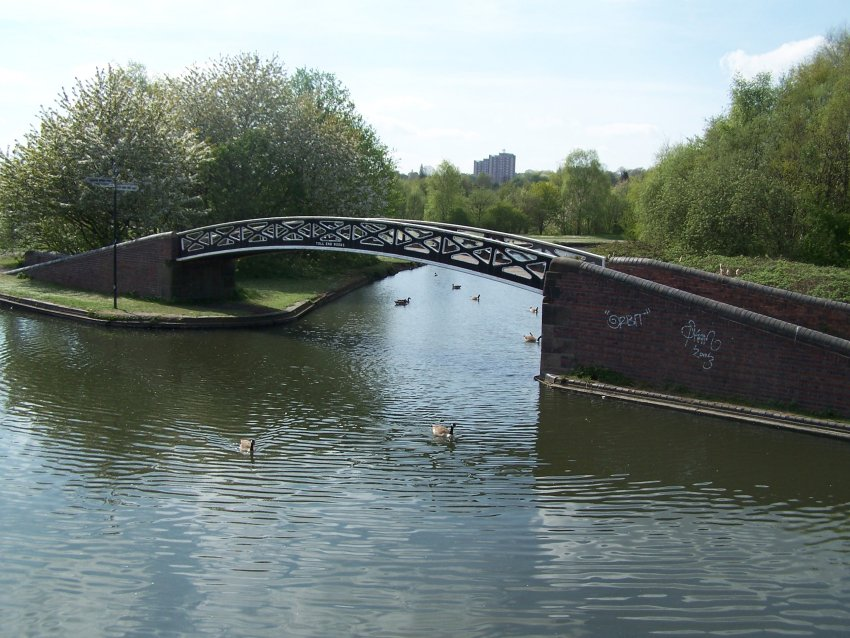
- Entrance to Boshboil Branch (under Boshboil Arm Bridge)]
- Interactive map of Bumble Hole Branch Canal

Specifications
- Status: Navigable
- Navigation authority: Canal and River Trust

History
- Date of act: 1793
- Date completed: 1798

Geography
- Connects to: Dudley Canal; Netherton Tunnel

The present day Bumble Hole Branch Canal and Boshboil Branch surround Bumble Hole, a water-filled clay pit, in Bumble Hole and Warren's Hall Nature Reserve, Rowley Regis, West Midlands, England. They formed a looped part of the original Dudley No. 2 Canal until the opening of the Netherton Tunnel in 1858 when the loop was bypassed by a new cut, in line with the new tunnel. Part of the bypassed canal loop, which surrounds Bumble Hole, is now in-filled giving access to the pool of Bumble Hole. An area next to the Bumble Hole and Dudley canals is the Bumble Hole Local Nature Reserve.

== History ==
The Dudley Canal had completed a route from south of Dudley to Delph Locks, at the bottom of which it connected to the Stourbridge Canal. It opened in 1779, but trade only started to develop when the Stourbridge Canal was completed in 1781. They then set about linking it to the Birmingham Canal Navigations by constructing a long tunnel through the ridge of land to the north of their canal. This was fraught with delays, but finally opened in 1792. Within months, they embarked on a plan for another canal, known as the Dudley No. 2 Canal, which would link the south end of Dudley Tunnel to the Worcester and Birmingham Canal at Selly Oak, involving another long tunnel at Lappal. This was authorised by the Selly Oak Canal Act 1793 (33 Geo. 3. c. 121), and construction of the canal was finished in May 1798.

At Netherton, around 2.4 miles (3.9 km) from the start of the canal, it made a loop to the west, to access collieries at Netherton. From the western side of the loop, the Bufferies Branch ran to the north-west, to serve Netherton Colliery. This was one of several collateral cuts authorised by the 1793 act of Parliament. Only around half of the authorised length was actually constructed, and it opened in 1803. It was originally planned to end at Baptistend Colliery, but instead a tramway was built to the coal mine, while a feeder carried water into the canal. Close to Bufferies Junction, another branch heading northwards served Windmillend Colliery, to which it was connected by a tramway with two long inclines. By 1904, the tramway had been extended south to Bufferies Junction, and the basin was no more.

The Birmingham Canal Navigations Act 1855 (18 & 19 Vict. c. cxxi) was obtained, which authorised the construction of the Netherton Tunnel, to provide a better link between the Birmingham Canal Navigations and the Dudley Canal. It also authorised the construction of the Two Locks Line, a short link which saved boats from having to travel north on the No.1 Canal, around the Bumblehole loop, and then south on the No.2 Canal, and straightening of the canal at Bumblehole, effectively cutting across the neck of the loop to provide better access to the tunnel when it was completed.

At the time of the 1855 act, the area was called Bumble Hole, as Bumble Hole toll gate was mentioned as the termination of the Netherton Tunnel branch, although the canal at that point was called the Netherton Branch. By 1904, there were two short basins heading north from the northern side of the loop. One served the Windmillend Boiler Works, which was disused at the time, and the other was connected by a tramway to Cobb's Engine House, a pumping engine next to the Netherton Tunnel approach. Dean shows Dixon's Green Furnace at roughly the same location as Windmillend Boiler Works, but gives no date.

The Bufferies Branch, also referred to as the Bumble Hole Branch, was closed as a result of the British Transport Commission Act 1955 (4 & 5 Eliz. 2. c. xxx) from just before Bumble Hole Bridge, which carried Bumblehole Road, to its terminus, 145 yards (133 m) to the north west. Bumble Hole Road has since been renamed to St Peter's Road, as it passes St Peter's Church near the junction of the Bumble Hole Branch with the Dudley Canal. At some point, part of the northern side of the Bumblehole Loop was filled in after it was affected by mining subsidence, and the short stub from Windmill End Junction became known as the Boshboil Branch.

== Features ==
The towpath on the Dudley No.2 Canal is on the east bank, and consequently ran around the inside of the Bumble Hole loop. A towpath bridge crosses the Dudley Canal immediately to the north of the junction with the Bumble Hole Branch, and another crosses the start of the Bumble Hole Branch. The Dudley Canal bridge is a grade II listed roving footbridge. It is made of cast iron, with brick abutments, and was manufactured by Toll End Works at Tipton. The side panels are pierced, to create a lattice of saltire crosses. The bridge over the Bumble Hole Branch is constructed of bricks. The canal is flanked by private gardens to the south west and the landscaped remains of the Bumble Hole clay pit on the towpath side. At the end of the branch is a 'Y' shaped basin, where there is a timber gallows crane, the last one known to survive, which dates from before 1882.

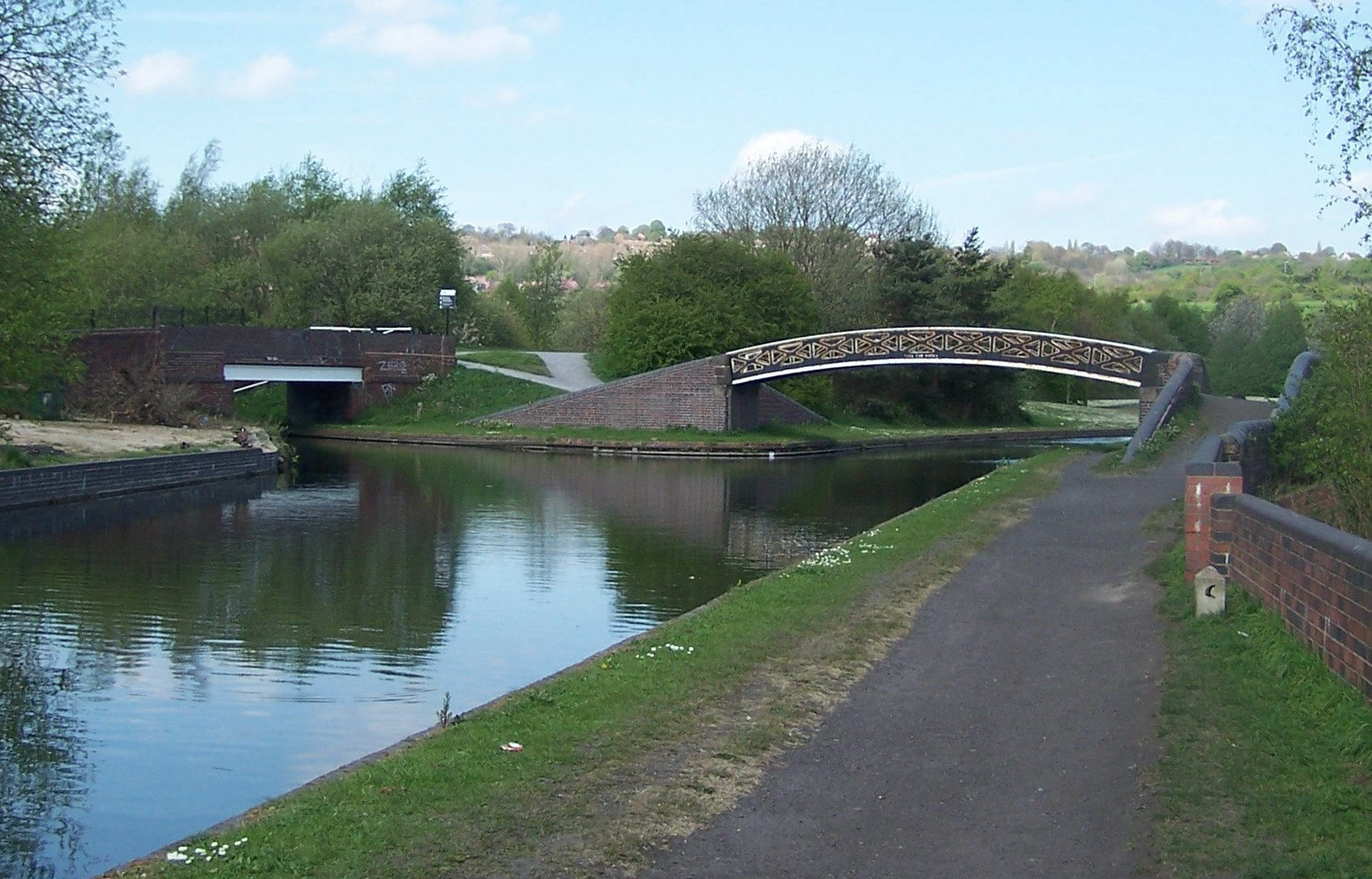
The brick-built Dunn's Bridge over the start of Bumble Hole Branch Canal on the left with the cast iron Bumble Hole Bridge over the Dudley No.2 Canal on the right

At Windmill End Junction, there is another grade II listed footbridge, manufactured by Toll End Works and very similar to that near the Bumble Hole Branch. This one crosses the Netherton Tunnel branch, and was probably built for the opening of that branch in 1858. There are two more towpath bridges connected with it, one over the Boshboil Arm and the other over the Dudley Canal as it heads east from the junction. A little further to the north are the remains of Cobb's Engine House, built in 1831 by Sir Horace St Paul, to drain the coal mines in the area. Next to it is a square-section chimney, 95 feet (29 m) tall. Both are scheduled monuments, and the engine house is the earliest of its type still standing.

Coal for the boilers was delivered by a double-track mineral railway, which crossed the canal on the large bridge constructed of blue bricks, located just to the south of the engine house. When the engine house was operating, it pumped 367,500 imperial gallons (1.671 Ml) of water from the mines into the canal each day. Bumble Hole Lake, in the former clay pit, is now a haven for wildlife, and also acts as a storm water balancing tank. The lake was created around 1970, and is bordered by flowering rushes. There is a visitor centre to the south of Windmill End Junction, opened in 1997. It is staffed by volunteers from the Bumble Hole Conservation Group, which was formed in 1994, and carries out maintenance on two nature reserves. These are the Bumble Hole Local Nature Reserve and Warrens Hall Local Nature Reserve, which surround the Bumble Hole Branch Canal and an area to the north of it. The nature reserve is the focal point for the Black Country Boating Festival which is held every year.

== Naming ==
Fisher suggests three possible derivations for the naming of Bumble Hole. The first is based on the large number of public houses by the canal at Windmill End, and Bumble Hole may refer to a place where people bumbled, or moved ineptly. The second relates to a steam hammer in the bottom of the clay pit, which made a "bum-hul" noise when operating. The "bum-hul in the hole" was then contracted to Bumble Hole. The third refers to an opening in furnaces, of which there were several in the foundries based around the loop. However, a map of Dudley Parish dating from 1780 shows a large house labelled Bumble Hole, and this usage predates the industrial development of the area.

For Boshboil, Fisher suggests a derivation from the process of making coke. Coal was heated in ovens, and the coke that formed was cooled by tipping it into "bosh tubs" which were large tanks full of water.

== Bumble Hole railway ==
The Bumble Hole railway used to cross the canal near Windmill End Junction, but was dismantled in 1969.

== Locations ==
Point	Coordinates (Links to map resources)	OS Grid Ref	Notes
Netherton Tunnel south portal	52.4933°N 2.0692°W	SO953884	
Cobb's Engine House	52.4929°N 2.0690°W	SO953883	
Windmill End Junction	52.4916°N 2.0702°W	SO952882	
Bumble Hole pool	52.4912°N 2.0732°W	SO950881	
Bumble Hole Branch (junction)	52.4900°N 2.0725°W	SO950880	

== See also ==
- Canals of the United Kingdom

== Bibliography ==
- Chester-Browne, Richard (1991). The Other Sixty Miles. Birmingham Canal Navigations Society.
- Dean, Richard (1989). Historical map of the Birmingham Canals. M & M Baldwin. ISBN 978-0-947712-08-2.
- Fisher, Graham (2021). "Down the Bumble Hole" (PDF). Royal Geographical Society. Archived (PDF) from the original on 26 January 2021.
- Hadfield, Charles (1985). The Canals of the West Midlands. David and Charles. ISBN 978-0-7153-8644-6.
- Palmer, Marilyn; Neaverson, Peter (1994). Industry in the Landscape, 1700-1900. Routledge. ISBN 0-415-11206-0.
- Nicholson (2014). Nicholson Guides Vol 2: Severn Avon and Birmingham. Harper Collins. ISBN 978-0-00-753898-0.
