= Gower Branch Canal =

Half-mile canal at Tividale, England

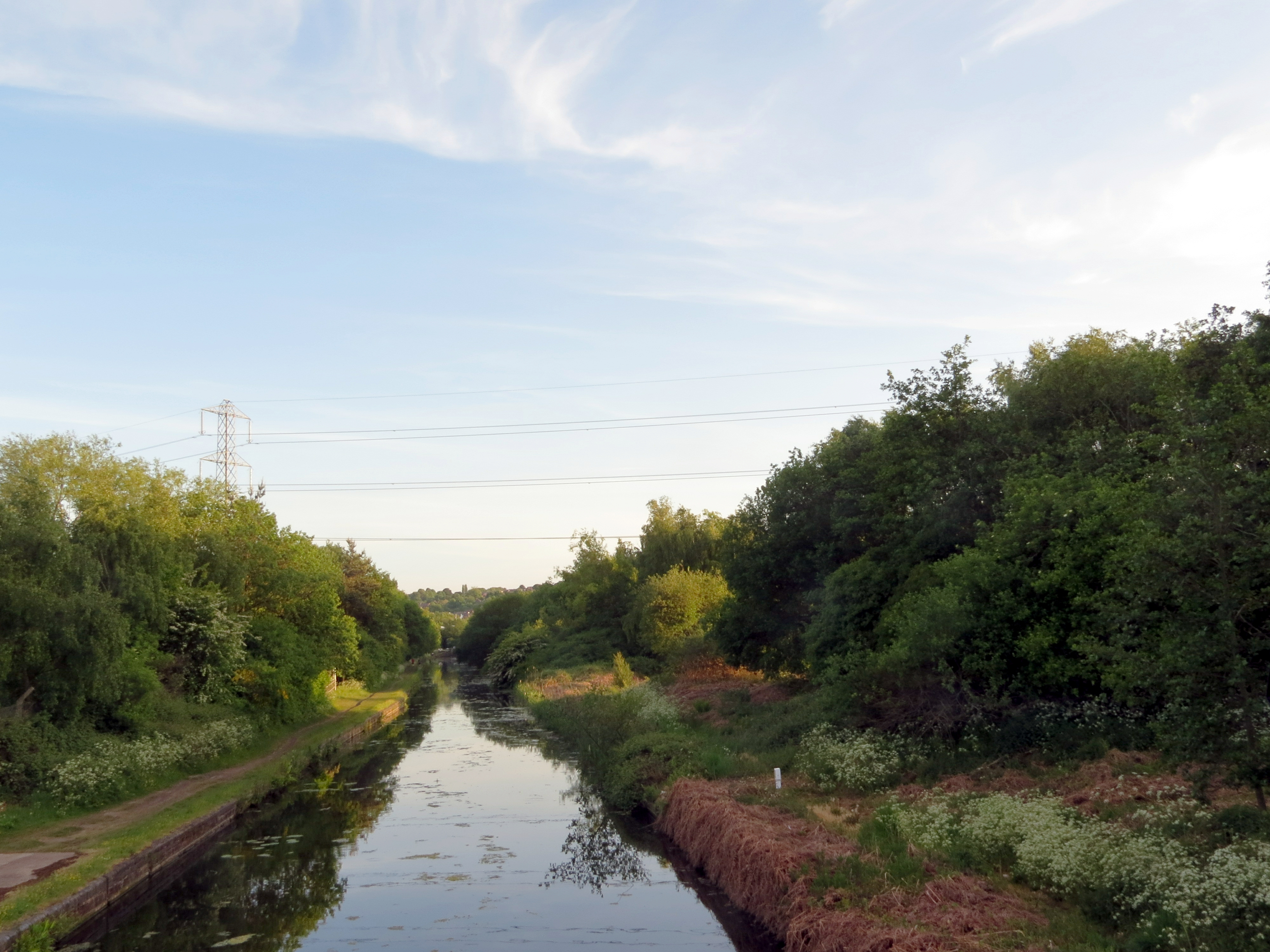
- Gower Branch Canal viewed from Albion Junction

Specifications
- Locks: 3
- Status: Navigable

History
- Date of act: 1768

Geography
- Connects to: BCN Old Main Line; Netherton Tunnel Branch Canal

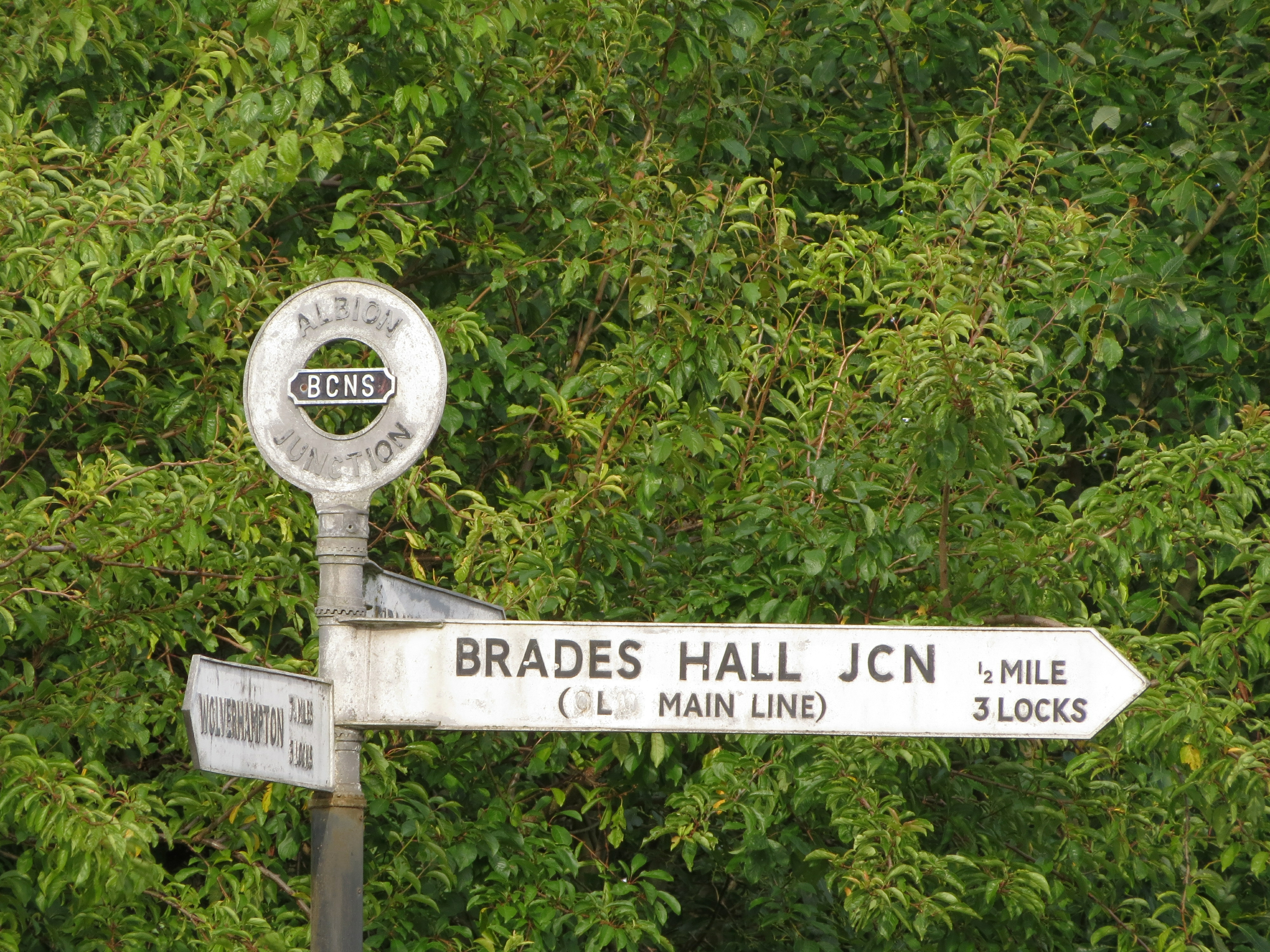
Signpost at Albion Junction for Brades Hall Junction.

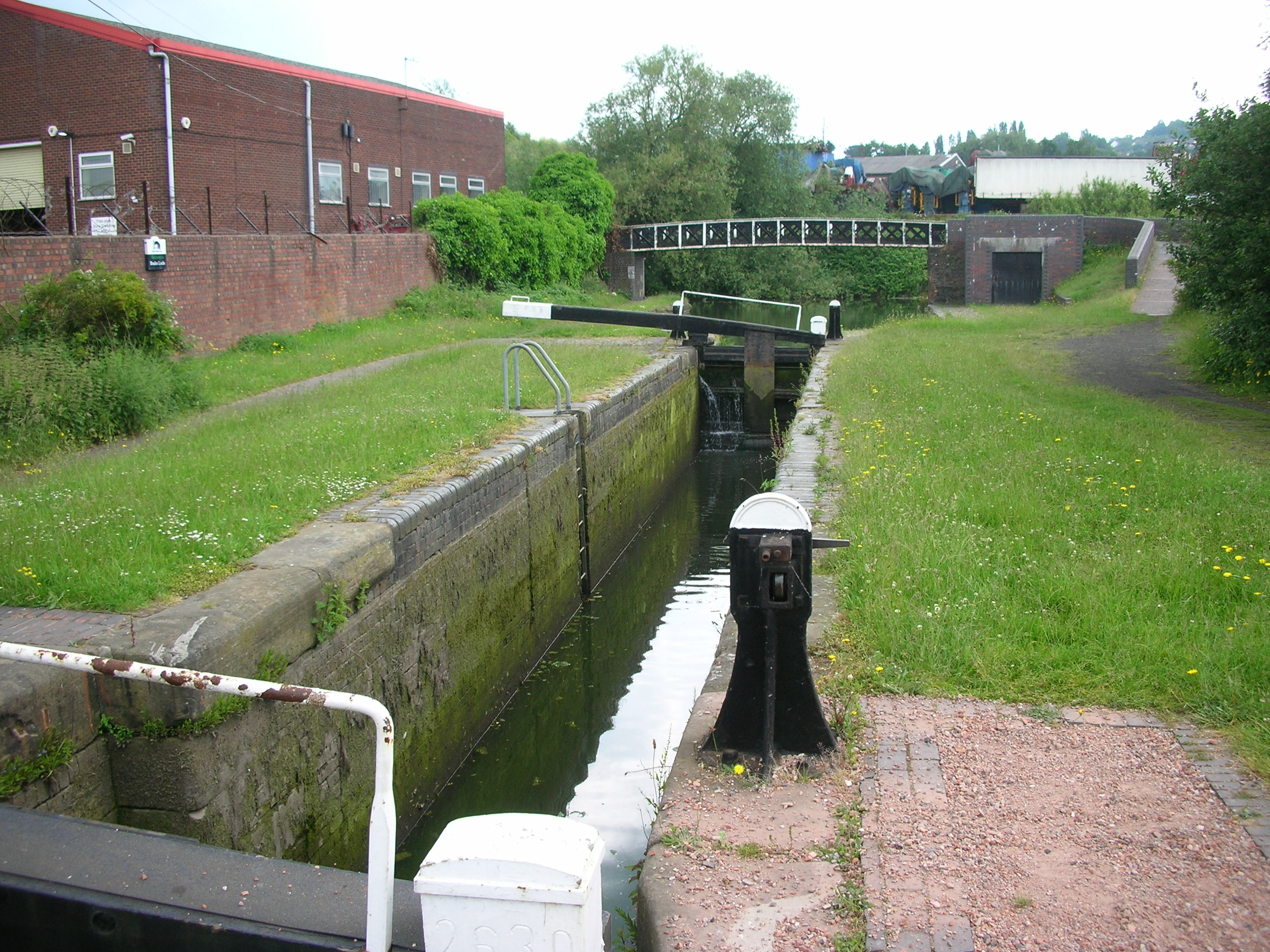
Top staircase lock and Brades Hall Junction (behind the iron bridge)

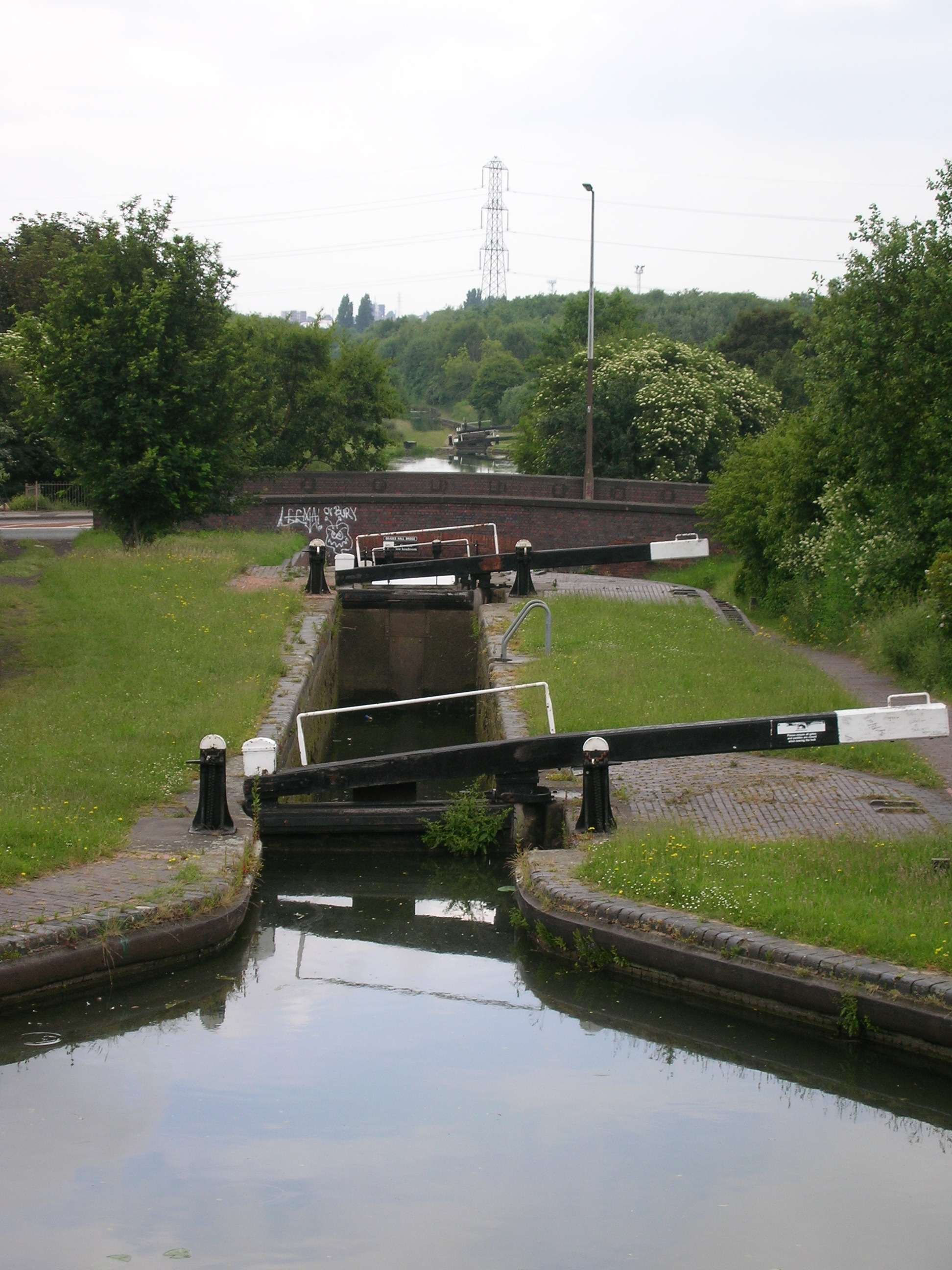
Brades (staircase) locks, photographed from the bridge

The Gower Branch Canal is a half-mile canal at Tividale in England, linking Albion Junction on the Birmingham Level (453 feet above sea) of the Birmingham Canal Navigations, and Brades Hall Junction (sometimes written Bradeshall Junction) on the BCN's older Wolverhampton (473 ft) level, via three locks, the Brades Locks, at the Southern, Brades Hall end.

It has a towpath on its eastern side and is crossed by only one road, the A457, just north of the middle lock. The branch is suitable for narrowboats of up to 70 foot length and 7 foot beam.

It facilitated travel between the Netherton Tunnel Branch Canal and the BCN Old Main Line, without the need for a long detour to Tipton or Smethwick and back.

== History ==
The branch was authorised by the Birmingham Canal Navigation Act 1768 (8 Geo. 3. c. 38), but was not completed until 1836.

== Features ==
Point	Coordinates (Links to map resources)	OS Grid Ref	Notes
Albion Junction	52.5177°N 2.0292°W	SO981911	BCN New Main Line (Island Line)
Mid point	52.5142°N 2.0311°W	SO978907	
Single lock	52.5127°N 2.0319°W	SO978905	
A457 bridge	52.5115°N 2.0328°W	SO977904	Dudley Road East
Staircase lock	52.5112°N 2.033°W	SO977904	
Brades Hall Junction	52.5106°N 2.0334°W	SO978903	BCN Old Main Line

== Photographs ==
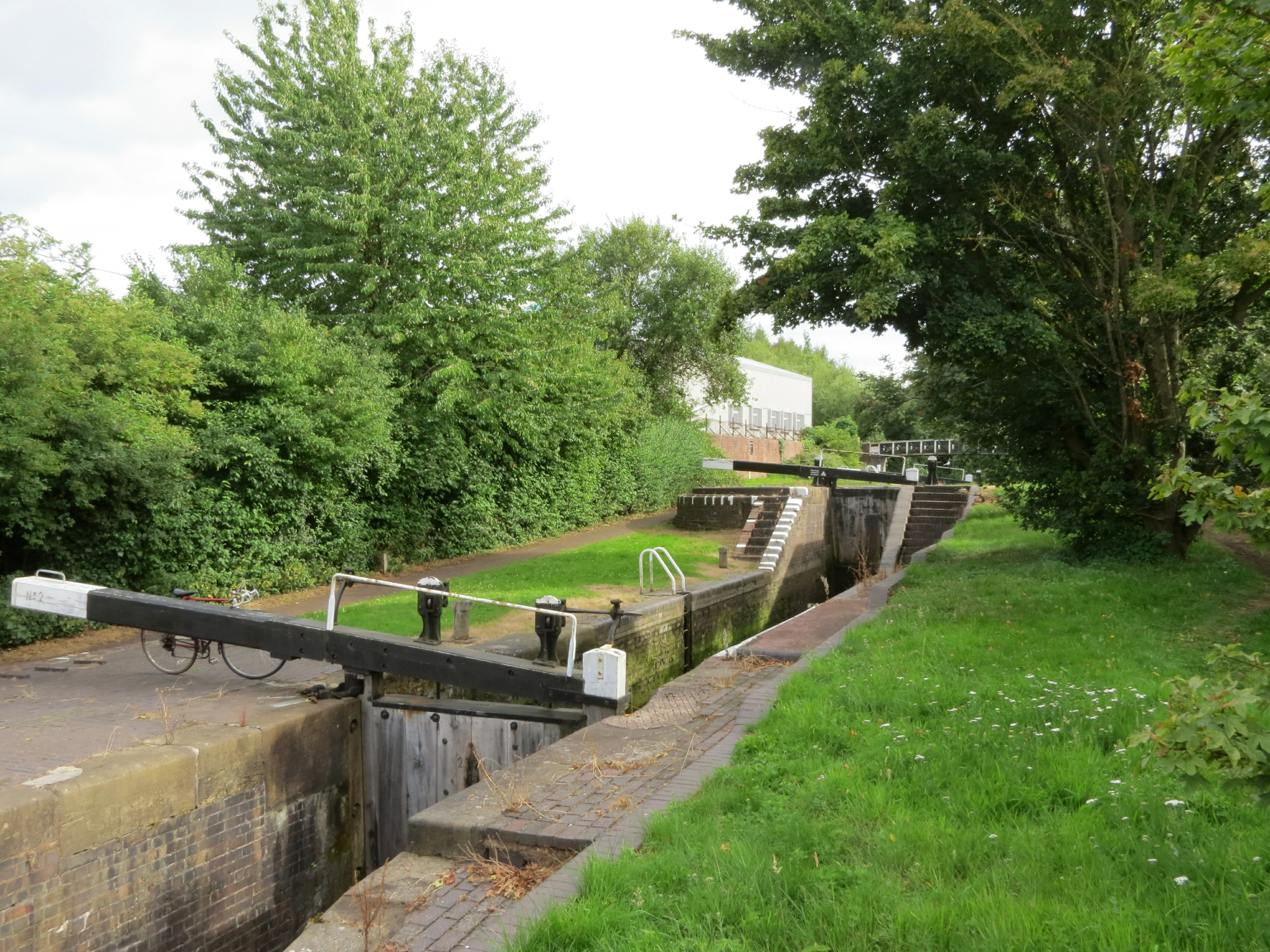
Looking up Brades Lock.

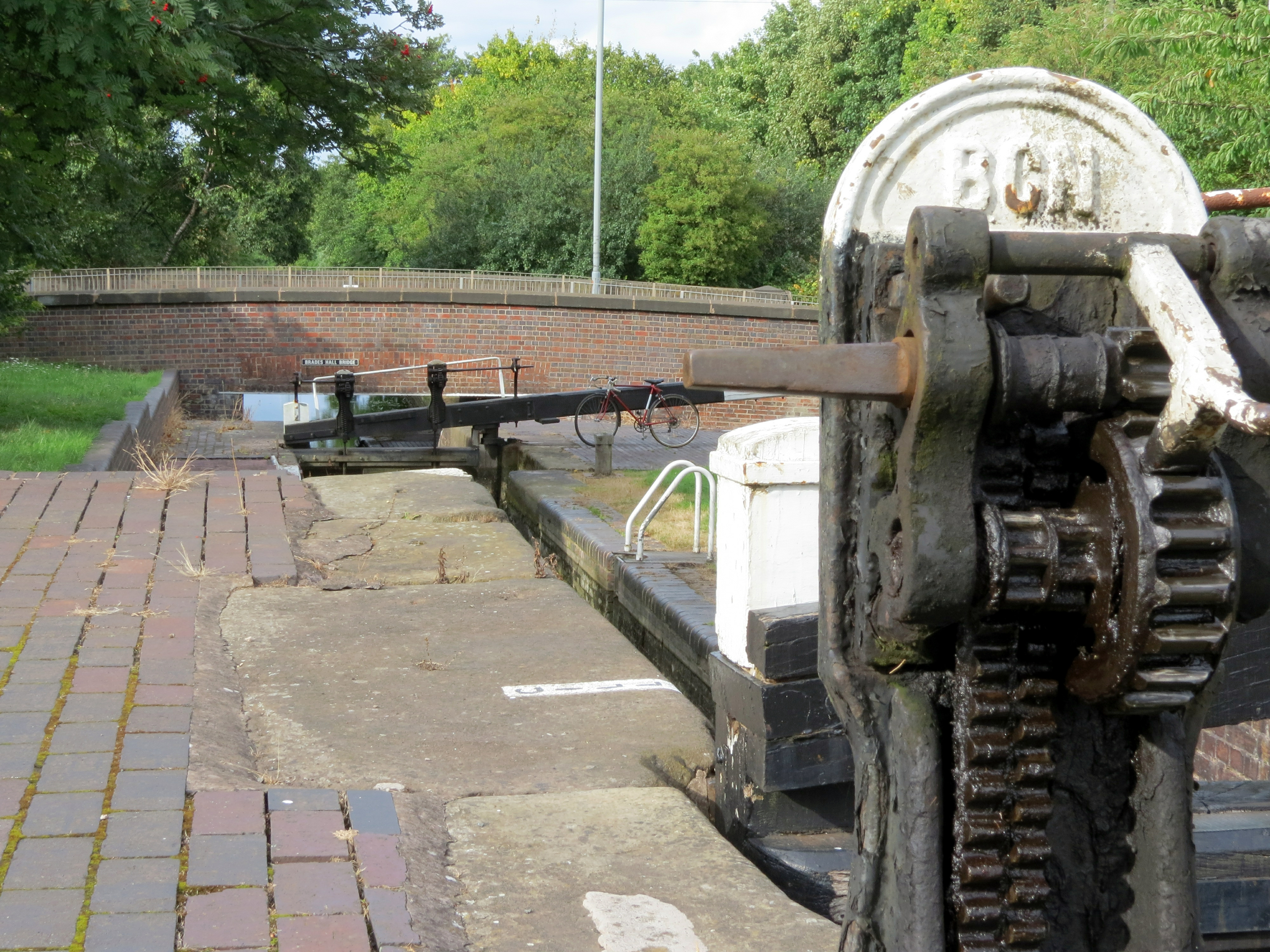
Middle section of Brades Lock.

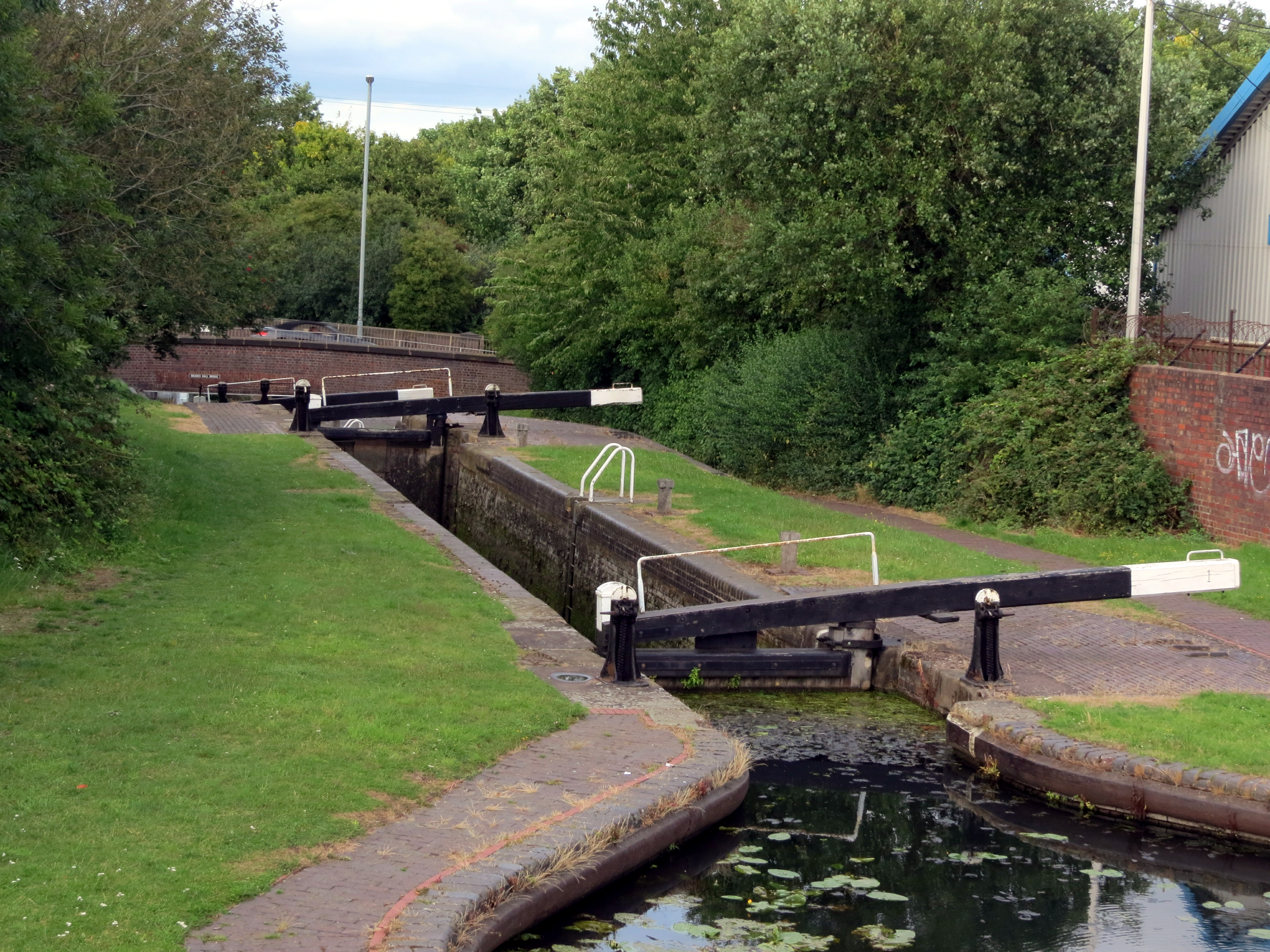
Looking down Brades Lock from the junction bridge.

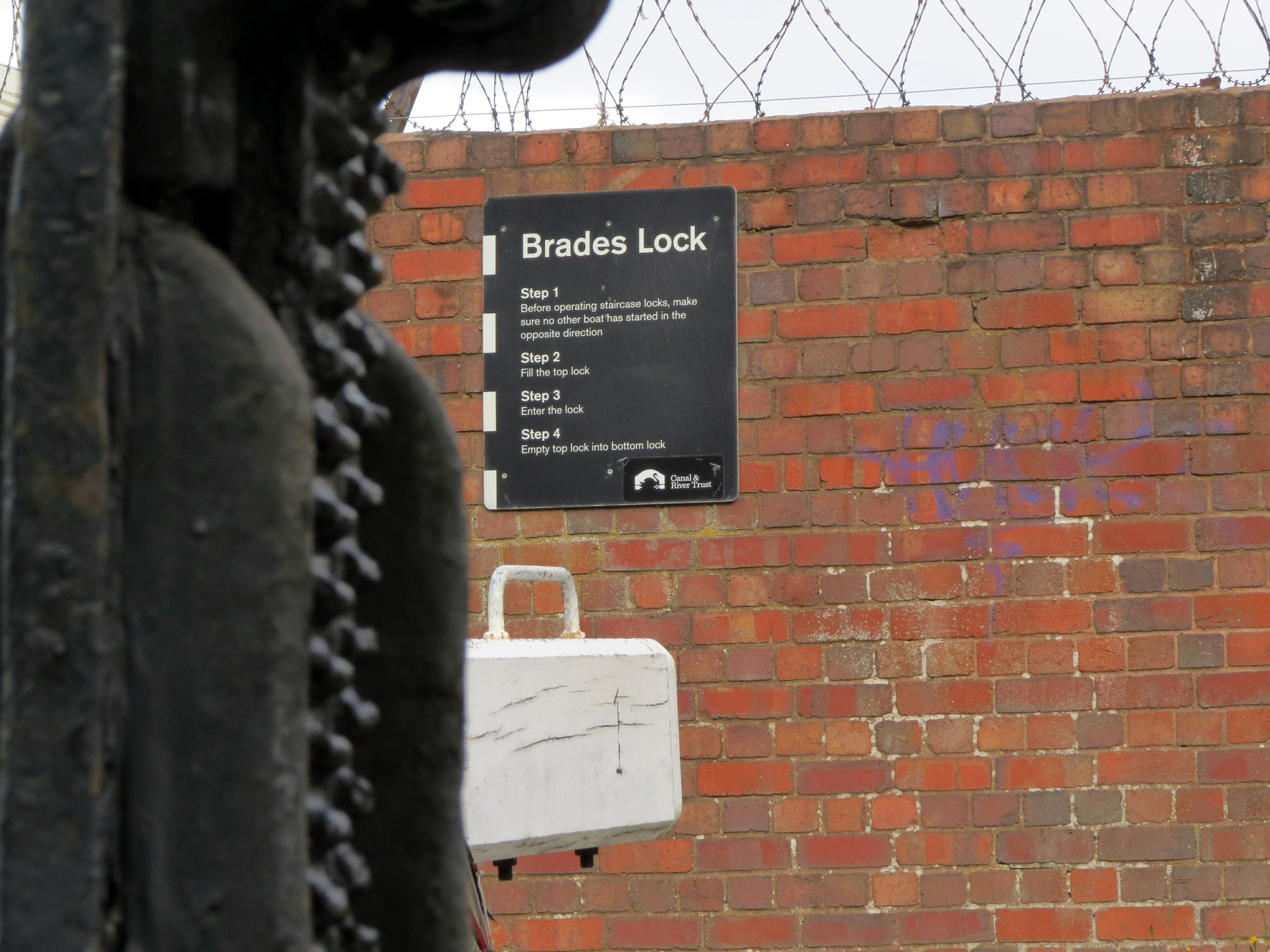
The instructions for using a staircase lock.

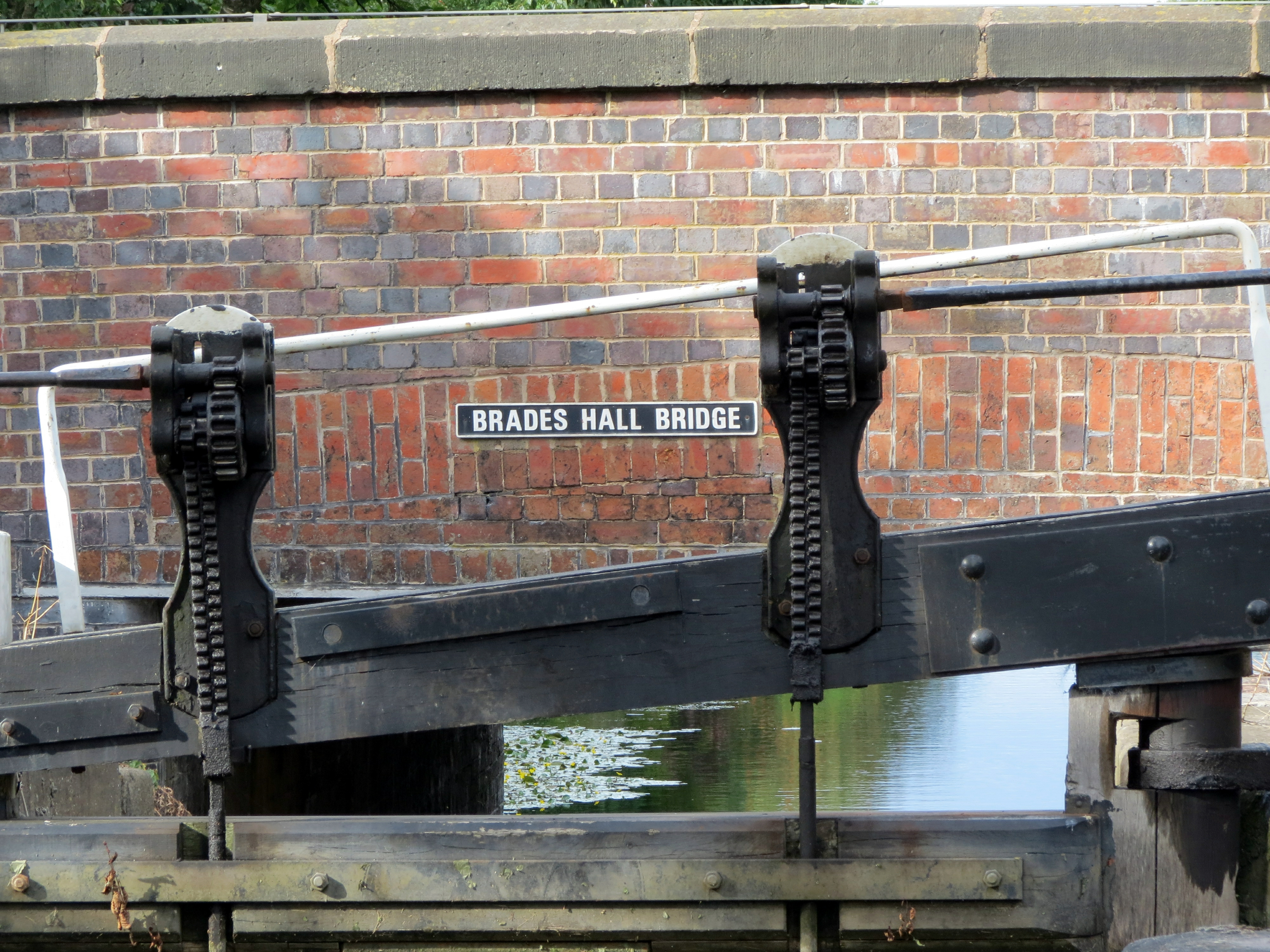
The lower lock gate of Brades Lock showing the bridge sign.

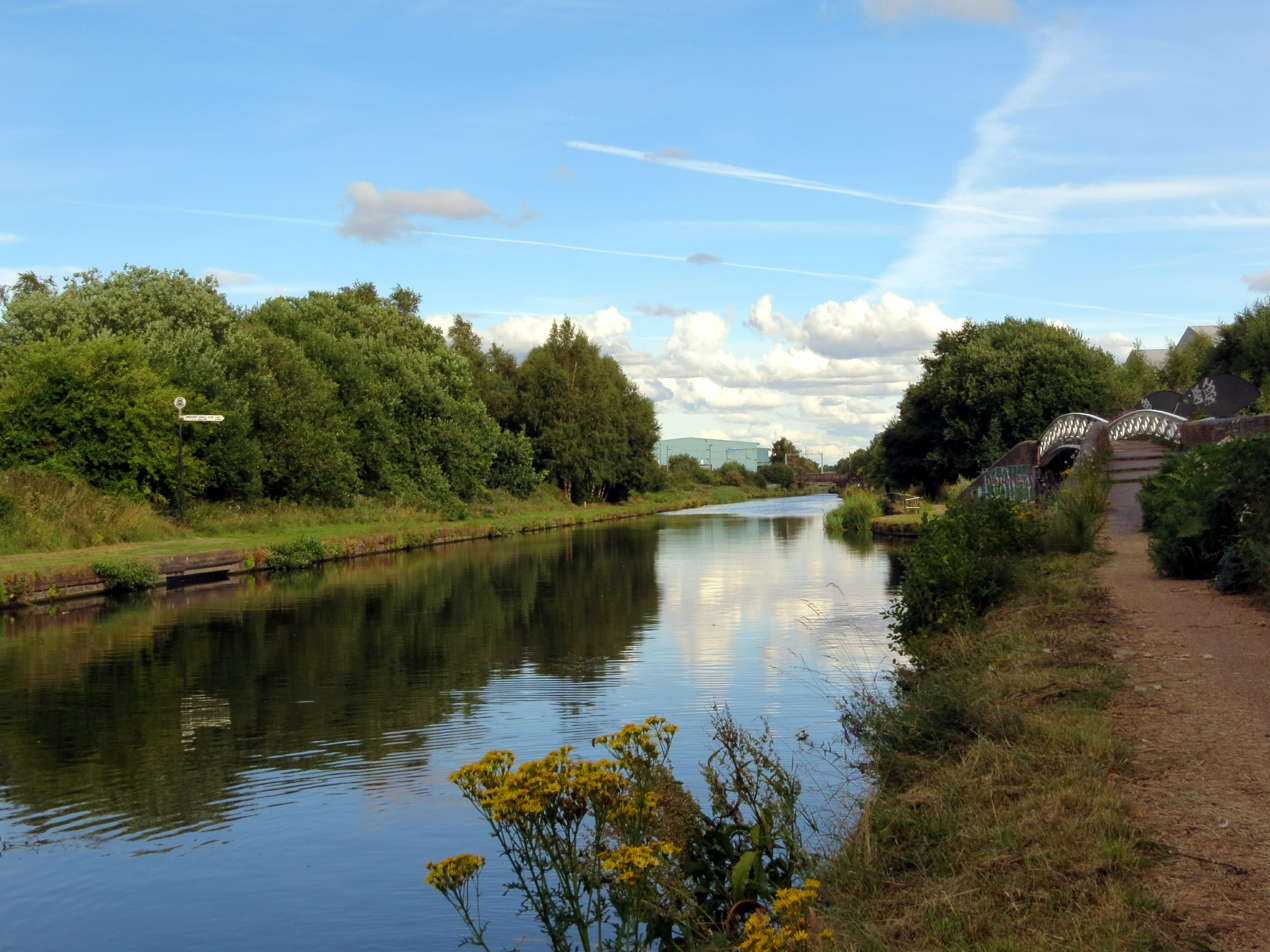
New Mainline Canal at Albion Junction.

== See also ==
- Canals of the United Kingdom
- History of the British canal system
