= Bumble Hole Local Nature Reserve =

Nature reserve in the West Midlands of England

Bumble Hole
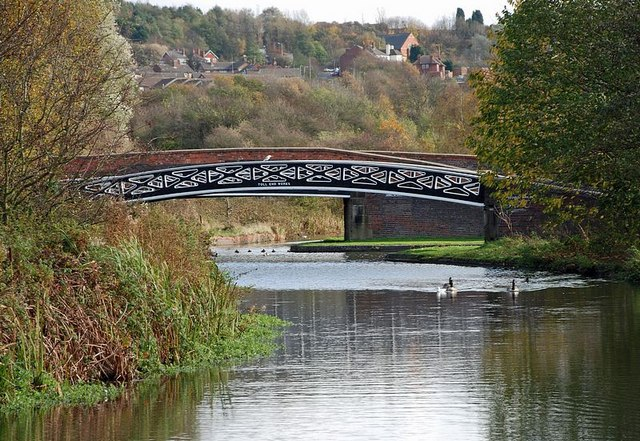
- The Bushboil Arm - a canal branch inside the reserve
- Interactive map of Bumble Hole
- Type: Local Nature Reserve
- Location: Netherton, England
- Coordinates: 52.492°N 2.072°W
- Created: 1996
- Operator: Dudley Metropolitan Borough Council
- Website: http://www.dudley.gov.uk/resident/environment/countryside/nature-reserves/bumble-hole-and-warrens-hall-local-nature-res/

Bumble Hole Local Nature Reserve is situated in the Netherton area of Dudley Metropolitan Borough in the county of West Midlands, England. This former industrial area now features canals, ponds, grassland and wooded areas. The reserve lies adjacent to the Warren's Hall Local Nature Reserve (which is in Sandwell Metropolitan Borough). It was declared a local nature reserve in 1996.

== History ==
The area comprising the Bumble Hole Local Nature Reserve and its neighbour, Warren's Hall Local Nature Reserve, once was a scene of industry, including coal mining, clay extraction, coke furnaces and boat building. A railway (known as the Bumble Hole Line) ran through the area, linking Dudley to Old Hill.

== Location ==
The reserve is located to the east of Netherton, about 1.5 miles south of Dudley, on the border with Sandwell Metropolitan Borough. Main access is via St Peter's Road, Netherton.

== Landscape ==
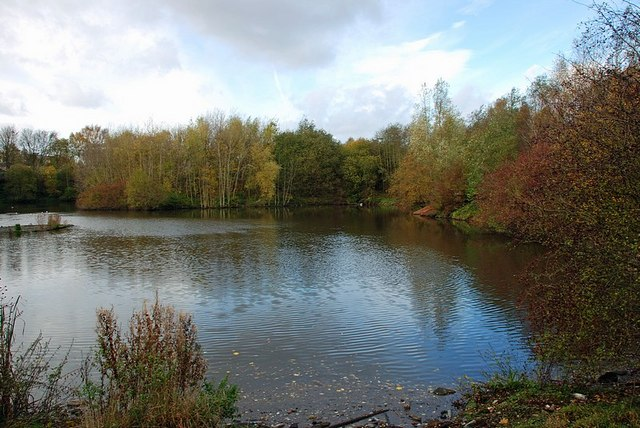
Bumble Hole Lake

The reserve contains areas of grassland, small wooded regions, canals and ponds. The Dudley No. 2 Canal runs into the reserve. Two short arms lead off from this canal: the Bumble Hole Branch and the Bushboil Arm. Bumble Hole Lake, a former clay pit, forms the largest body of water in the reserve. There is no visible border with the neighboring Warren's Hall Local Nature Reserve, so the two reserves effectively form a single visitor attraction.

== Facilities ==
A canal-side visitor centre run by volunteers from the Bumble Hole Conservation Group offers information on the reserve, as well as refreshments and toilet facilities. There is also a football pitch.

== Boating festival ==
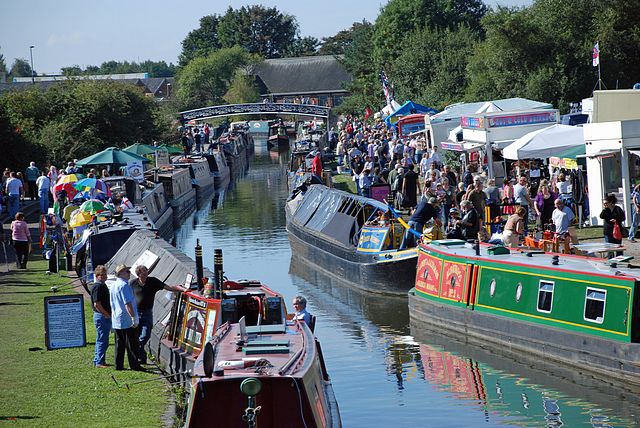
Annual boating festival at Bumble Hole

The reserve (plus the neighboring Warren's Hall Local Nature Reserve) is the site for an annual boating festival. The event attracts canal boats every September and features stalls, canal trips and a funfair.
