= Cobb's Engine House =

Engine house in Sandwell, West Midlands, England

Coordinates: 52.4929°N 2.069°W

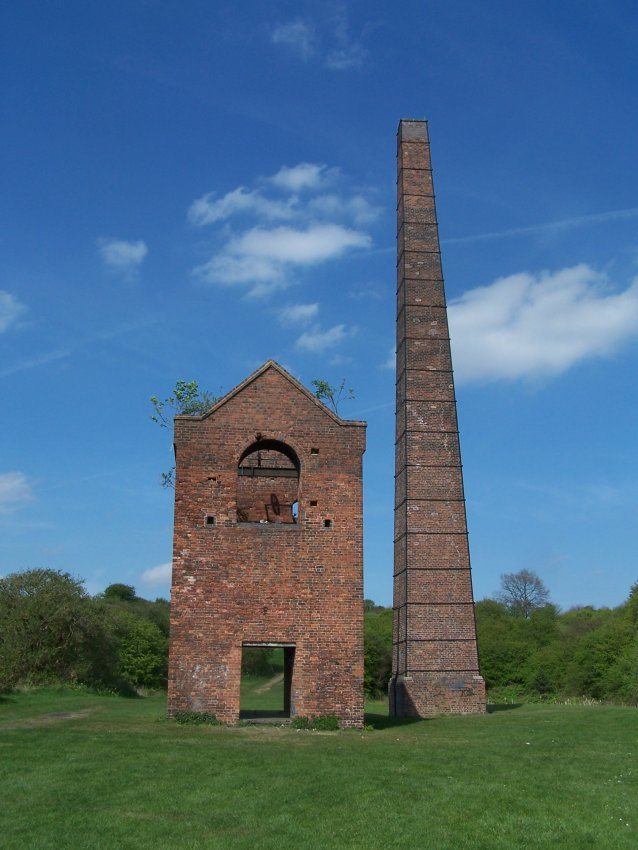
Cobb's Engine House

Cobb's Engine House (properly known as Windmill End Pumping Station) in Rowley Regis, West Midlands, England, is a scheduled ancient monument and a Grade II listed building built around 1831.

It housed a stationary steam pump used to pump water firstly from Windmill End Colliery and later other mines in the area. Utilising a shaft 525 feet deep, 1,600,000 litres of water were pumped from the mines into the canal daily. The engine was overhauled in 1874. In 1919–20 financial difficulties in the local coal mining industry led to many pits being flooded and Cobb's became the last colliery pumping engine operating in the area.

It ceased work in 1928. Certain sources state that the Newcomen type engine was moved to the Henry Ford Museum in Dearborn, Michigan in 1930, though another source states The Henry Ford Museum purchased a (modified) Newcomen Winding Engine from the same complex and removed it and its engine house to the museum. A photograph caption of the reconstructed installation on the museum website lists it as 'The Dudley Engine, circa 1791'.

Cobb's engine house originally had a cylinder floor at ground level and two floors above but they and the roof have gone, leaving the building as a shell. The chimney stands 95 feet (29 m) high and is 11.5 square feet (1.07 m^{2}) at the base, successively narrowing to 4 square feet (0.37 m^{2}) at the top.

The name of Cobb derives from a farmer who owned land in the neighbourhood before the engine house was built. From 1877 the engine house came to be officially known as Windmill End Pumping Station. It stands near Windmill End Junction in the Warren's Hall local nature reserve, where the Dudley No. 2 Canal and the Boshboil Arm meets the southern end of the Netherton Tunnel Branch Canal. The area came into the possession of Sir Horace St.Paul from his father-in-law, John Ward, 2nd Viscount Dudley and Ward, on his marriage to John's daughter Anna Maria Ward. It was Horace who instigated the construction of the engine house.
