= Warren's Hall Country Park =

Local natural reserve in Sandwell metropolitan Borough

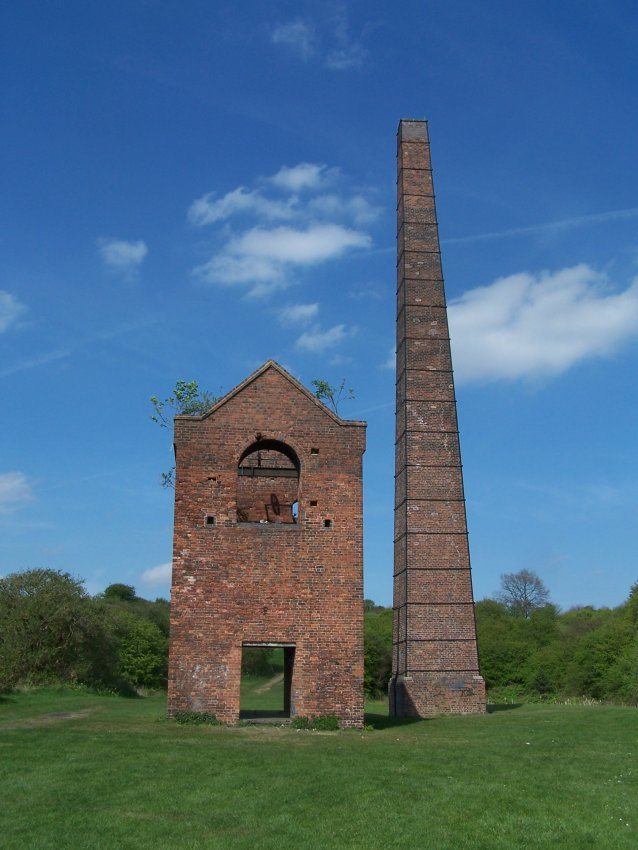
- Cobb's Engine House in the reserve. It once pumped water from the local coal mines
- Interactive map of Warren's Hall Country Park
- Type: Local Nature Reserve
- Location: Rowley Regis, England
- Coordinates: 52.494°N 2.067°W
- Created: 1996
- Operator: Sandwell Metropolitan Borough Council

Warren's Hall Country Park (also known as Warren's Hall Local Nature Reserve) is a local nature reserve situated in Sandwell Metropolitan Borough in the West Midlands of England. It lies next to Bumble Hole Local Nature Reserve. It includes ponds, canals, grassland, small wooded areas and the entrance to Netherton Canal Tunnel.

== History ==
The area comprising the Warren's Hall Local Nature Reserve—like that of its immediate neighbour, the Bumble Hole Local Nature Reserve—was once was a scene of industry, including coal mining. The reserve is laid out partly on farmland and partly on the sites of Windmill Hill and Warren's Hall collieries. The most obvious remains from this period include Cobb's Engine House and the Dudley No. 2 Canal, including the entrance to Netherton Tunnel.

The area was declared a local nature reserve in 1996.

== Location ==
The reserve is to the east of Netherton, about 1.5 miles south of Dudley, on the border with Dudley Metropolitan Borough. Main access by car is via Dudley Road.

== Landscape ==
The area contains grassland, ponds, canals and small wooded areas. The reserve contains the Blow Cold Bank Colliery Spoil Heap, which is now grassed over.

== Facilities ==
A visitor centre located by the Dudley No. 2 Canal provides information on both the Warren's Park and Bumble Hole Nature Reserves. The centre is sited on the Bumble Hole side. Fishing is allowed on two of the small pools in the reserve on payment of a fee and under certain conditions.
