= Netherton Tunnel Branch Canal =

Canal tunnel in the West Midlands, England

Netherton Tunnel
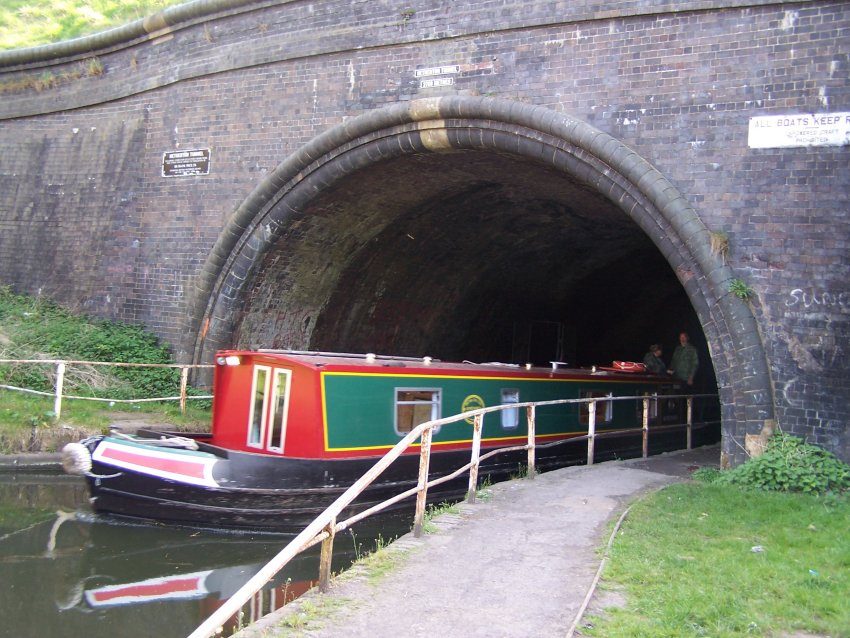
- Netherton Tunnel North Portal in use 2007
- Interactive map of Netherton Tunnel

Overview
- Coordinates: 52.50435°N 2.05932°W
- Status: Open
- Waterway: Birmingham Canal Navigations
- Start: 52.51534°N 2.04948°W
- End: 52.49335°N 2.06916°W

Operation
- Constructed: 1855–1858
- Opened: 20 August 1858
- Owner: Canal and River Trust

Technical
- Length: 9,081 feet (2,768 m)
- Tunnel clearance: 16 feet (4.9 m)
- Width: 27 feet (8.2 m)
- Towpath: Yes (two)
- Boat-passable: Yes

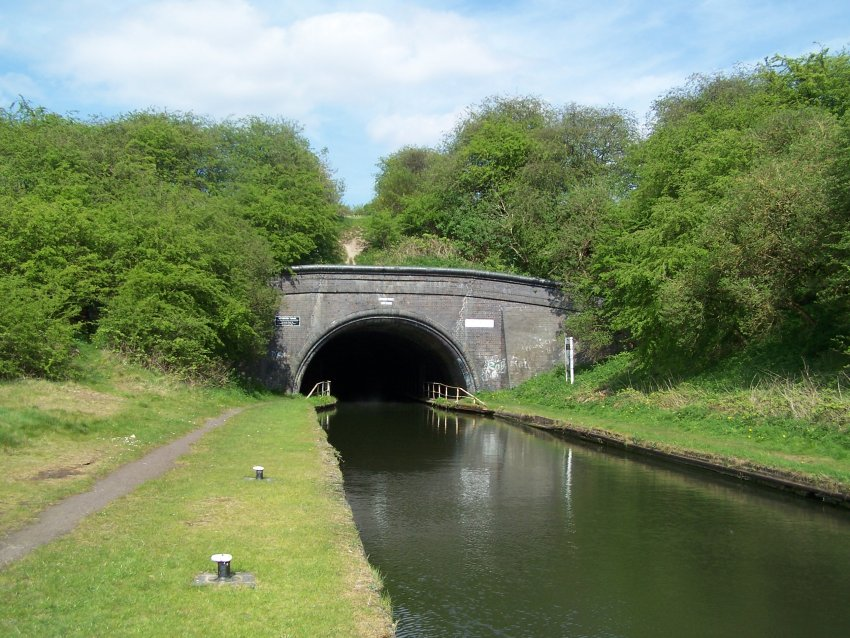
Netherton Tunnel South Portal 2007

Netherton Tunnel Branch Canal, in the West Midlands county, England, is part of the Birmingham Canal Navigations, (BCN). It was constructed at a 453–foot elevation, the Wednesbury or Birmingham level; it has no locks. The total length of the branch canal is 2.4 miles (3.9 km) and the canal tunnel is 9,081 feet (2,768 m) long.

Netherton Tunnel was the last canal tunnel to be built in Britain during the Canal Age. The first sod was turned by the Lord Ward on 31 December 1855 and the canal opened on 20 August 1858, providing a waterway connection between the Black Country towns of Netherton and Tipton. It was built to relieve the bottleneck of the adjacent Dudley Tunnel which is very narrow, has alternating blocks of one-way working, and had waiting times of eight hours or more, and sometimes several days.

The Netherton tunnel was built with a width of 27 feet (8.2 m) to allow two-way working of narrowboats; and is brick lined throughout. It has towpaths running through it, one on each side, which enabled horse-drawn narrowboats to be pulled through it. Chainage (distance) markers are still visible on the Eastern wall. The tunnel was fitted, from the start, with gas lighting over the towpaths, though this was later converted to electricity and it is now unlit.

The air vents that run along the line of the tunnel and provide ventilation, and a shaft of light into the canal, are known by the locals as "pepper pots", because of their shape. They are brick-lined and the openings are covered by an iron frame or grill. The wide bore and good ventilation mean that boats using the tunnel today are allowed to use the power of their internal combustion engines, which is prohibited in the narrower Dudley Tunnel.

The tunnel cost £302,000 as opposed to the £238,000 estimate prior to construction. The main reason for the project being overbudget was the extra works necessitated by the condition of the ground through which the tunnel passes.

== Repairs ==
In 1983, the British Waterways Board had 80 yards (73.2 m) of the brick invert replaced with concrete as a result of the invert rising sufficiently to impede navigation.

In 2011, significant cracks were found in part of the tunnel lining. Traffic through the tunnel was limited, as a result. Repair work began early in 2013.

== Route ==
The canal runs south-west from the BCN New Main Line at Dudley Port Junction and under the Old Main Line at Tividale Aqueduct. The northern mouth of the tunnel is near Dudley Road West, close to Tipton's border with Oldbury. An air-vent stands in the middle of Aston Road; another stands between two houses in Regent Road, both in the Tividale Hall estate near Dudley. The southern mouth of the tunnel is in Warrens Hall Park on the border of Dudley and Rowley Regis - the Bumble Hole and Cobb's Engine House are nearby. The Bumble Hole is a landscaped man made lake on the site of a former clay pit. The Dudley No. 2 Canal and the Boshboil Canal Arm are joined at Windmill End Junction. The Boshboil Arm was once part of a loop of the original Dudley Canal which went around Bumble Hole. This loop ceased to be part of the main line when a more direct line was cut. The loop became severed into two arms as a result of subsidence. The northern arm is the Boshboil Arm the southern is the Bumble Hole Branch.

=== Features ===
Point	Coordinates (links to map & photo sources)
Dudley Port Junction	52.52204°N 2.04331°W
Groveland Bridge (Tipton Road, A457)	52.51758°N 2.04760°W
Tividale Aqueduct (Old BCN Main Line)	52.51640°N 2.04843°W
Northern tunnel portal	52.51534°N 2.04948°W
Air vent No. 16	52.512436°N 2.052015°W
Packwood Road Air vent (No. 14)	52.50986°N 2.054329°W
Aston Road air vent	52.50850°N 2.05518°W
Regent Road air vent	52.50697°N 2.05708°W
Approx. tunnel midpoint	52.50435°N 2.05932°W
Air vent No. 8	52.504191°N 2.059364°W
Air vent No. 6	52.501551°N 2.061764°W
Air vent No. 4	52.499036°N 2.064032°W
Air vent No. 2	52.496345°N 2.066459°W
Southern tunnel portal	52.49335°N 2.06916°W
Windmill End Junction	52.49157°N 2.07019°W

== Gallery ==
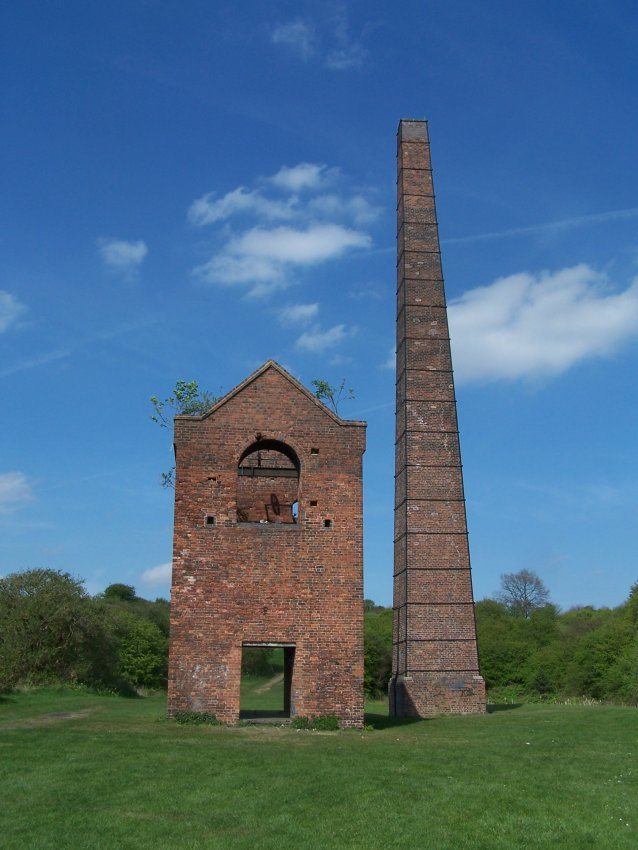
Cobb's Engine House near the southern portal

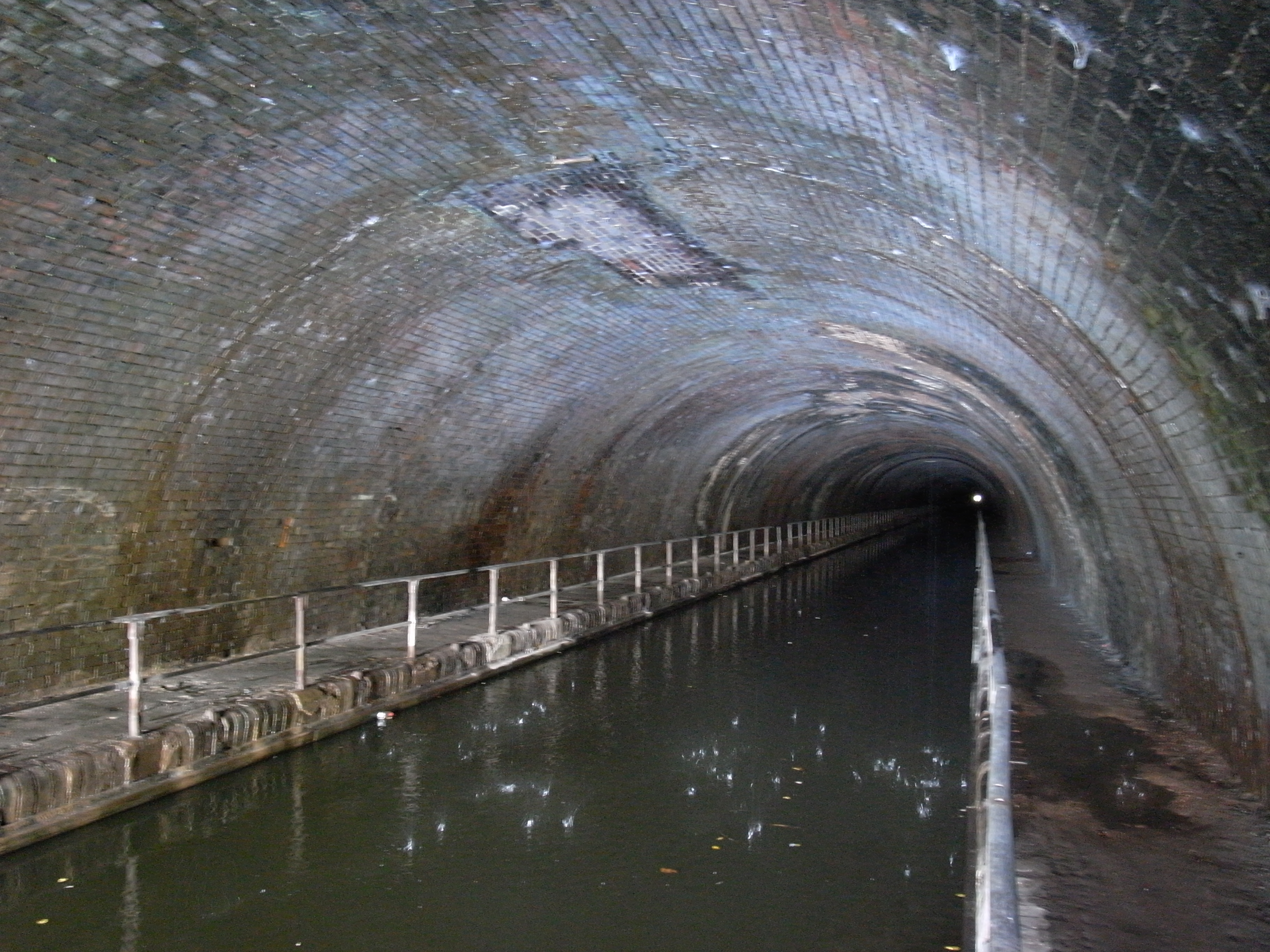
Netherton Tunnel inside northern portal showing the dual towpath

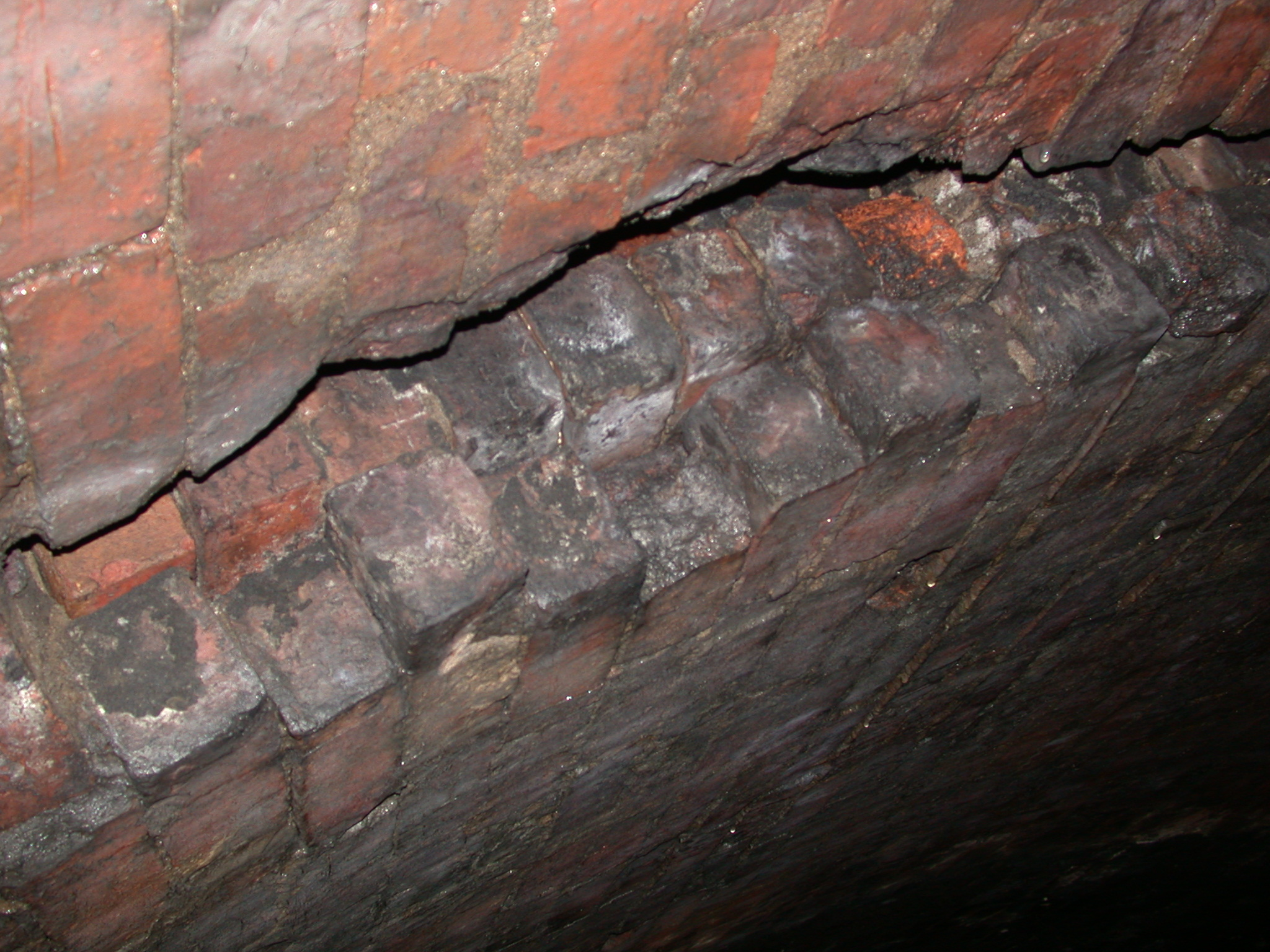
Slippage in the roof of a southern end of the tunnel, caused by the 2002 Dudley earthquake

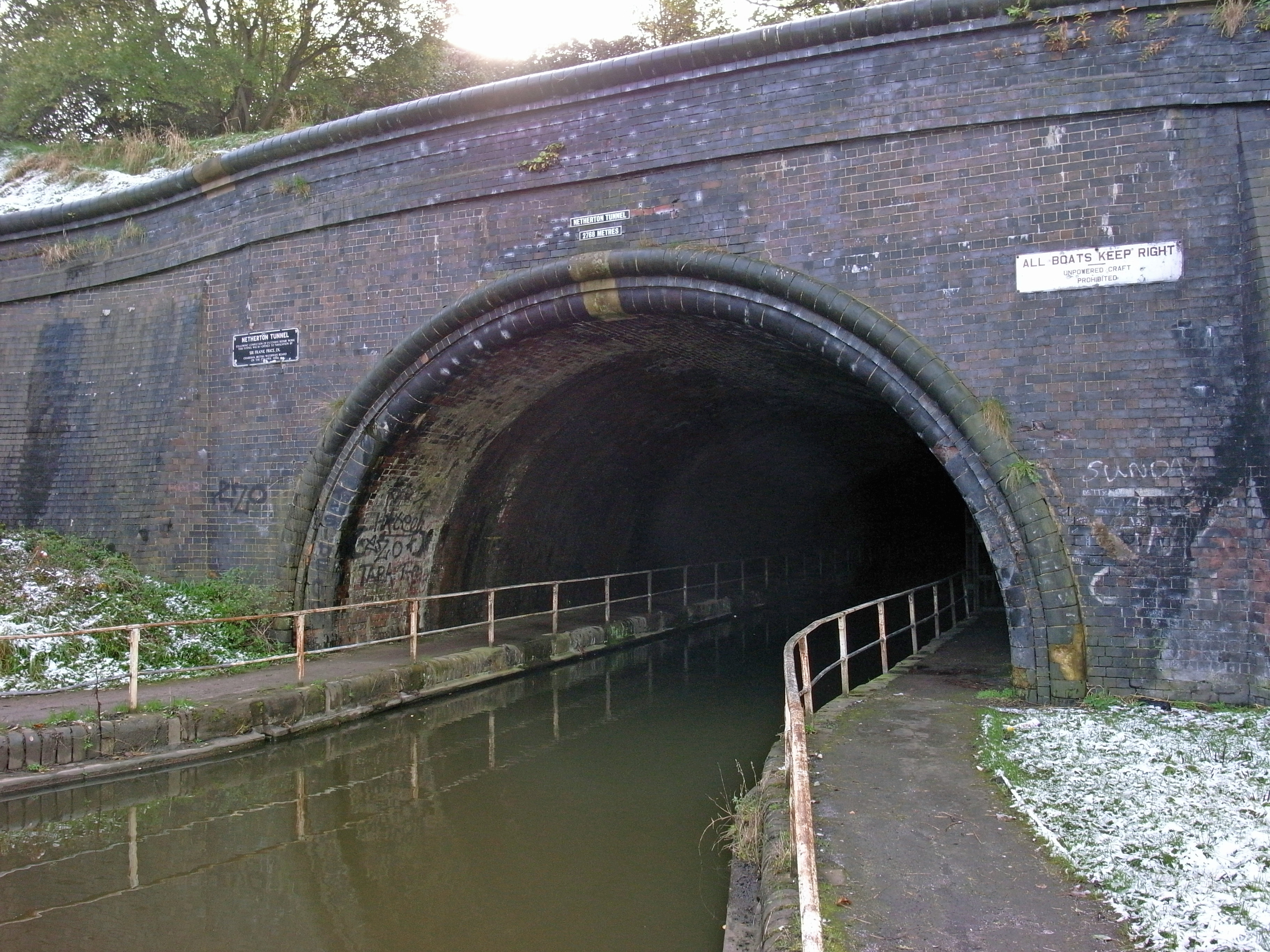
Netherton Tunnel northern portal

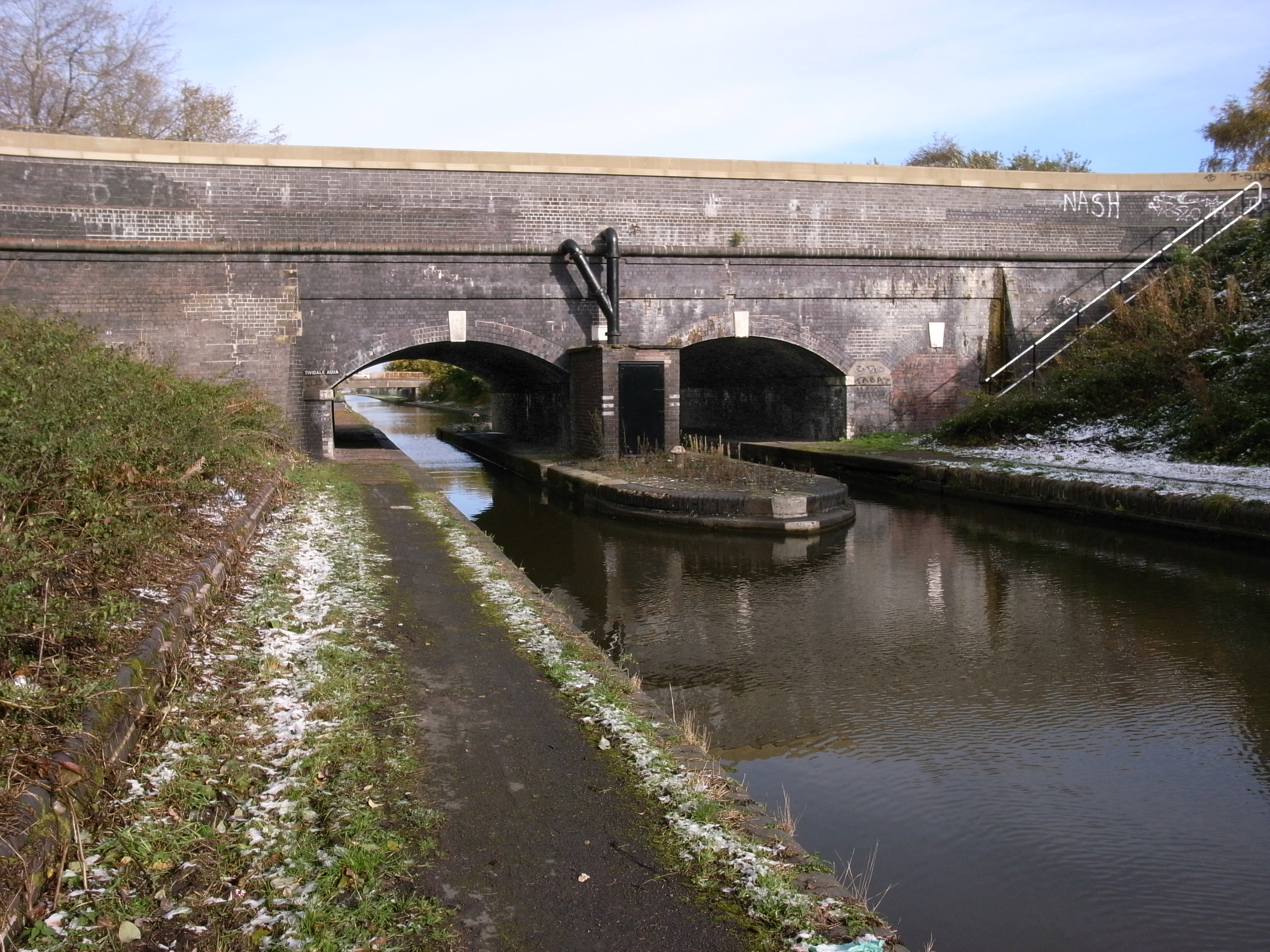
Tividale Aqueduct with old turbine which once generated electricity to illuminate the tunnel

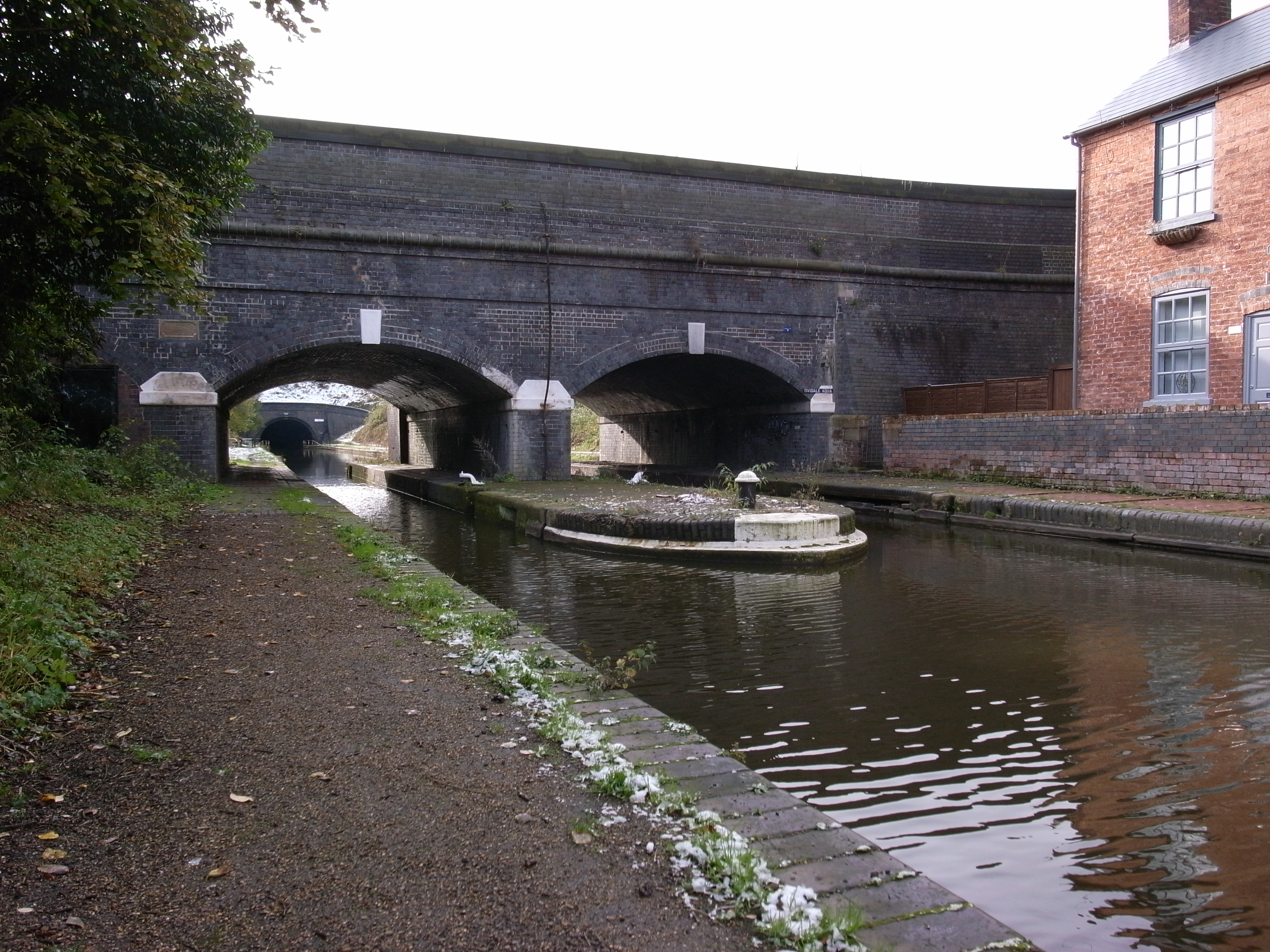
Tividale Aqueduct and Netherton Tunnel northern portal

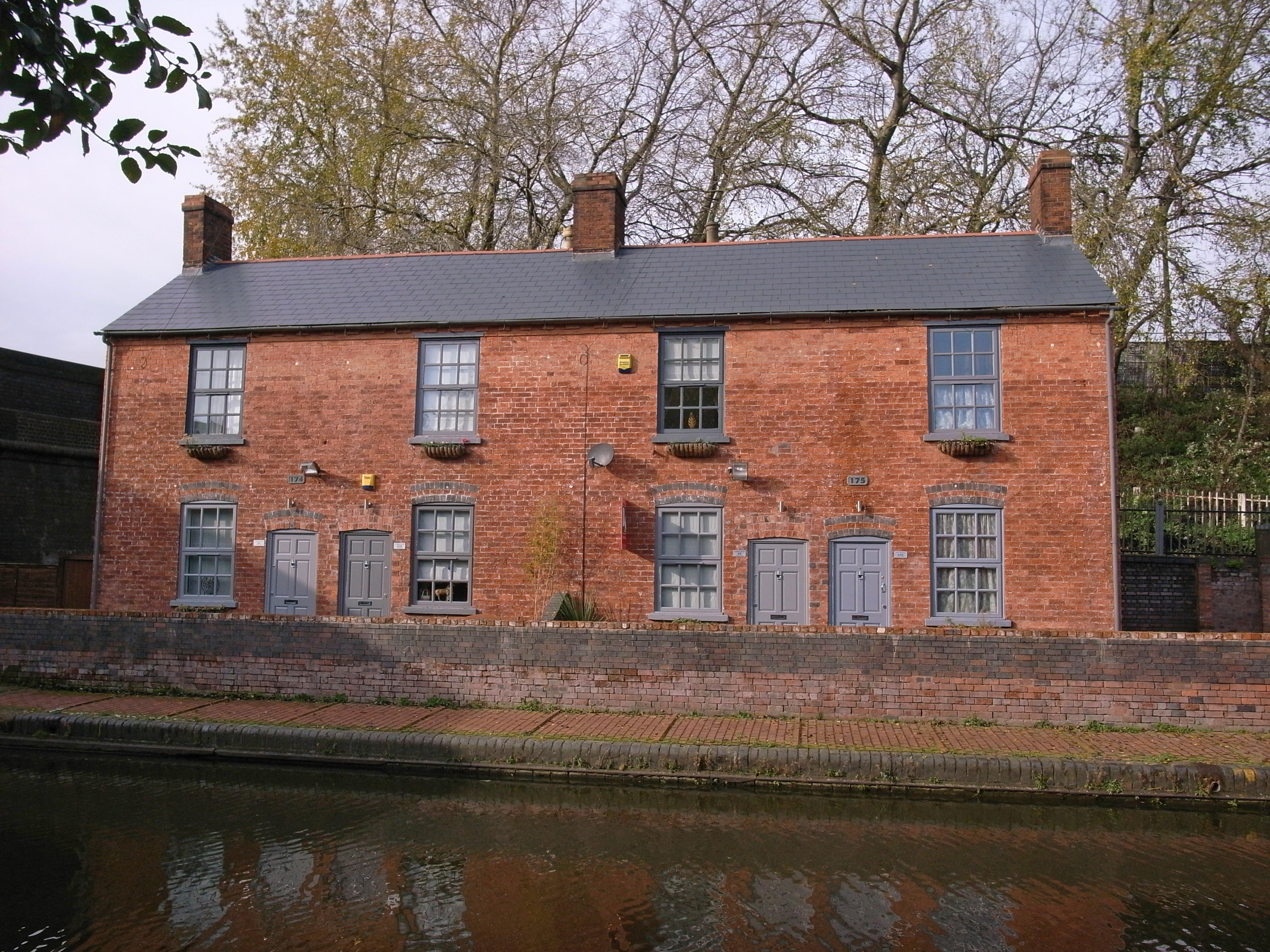
Canal cottages on the branch at Tividale Aqueduct

== See also ==
- List of canal tunnels in the United Kingdom
