= Little Heath, Coventry =

Suburb of Coventry, West Midlands, England

Coordinates: 52°26.4′N 1°29.3′W

Little Heath is an area of Coventry, in the county of West Midlands, in England. Most of the Little Heath area is in the Longford ward of the city.

Little Heath mainly consists of the following residential streets: Gayer Street, Thomas Lane Street, Partridge Croft, Quilletts Close, part of Proffitt Avenue and most of Old Church Road. It also contains a former Courtaulds factory, which is currently being demolished, and Little Heath Industrial Estate. The Coventry Canal passes through the area. Little Heath is within walking distance of the Arena Park Tesco Superstore, and close to the Foleshill fire station. The Royal Hotel is situated on Old Church Road by the canal bridge and is the only public house in the area.

Most of the area's terraced properties were built around 1910–1930, and Little Heath is served by a primary school of the same name. Also in the area is Good Shepherd Roman Catholic (RC) Primary School, which shares its sports field with Little Heath Primary School. The Catholic parish church for Good Shepherd Primary School is St. Elizabeth's RC Church in Edgwick. The Church of England (C of E) church for Little Heath is St Laurence's, which has a church hall also used for groups such as the Brownies and Girl Guides. At the top end of Old Church Road there is another school - St Laurence's C of E Primary School, which was previously known as Foleshill C of E Primary school - which is not actually in modern-day Foleshill, but is so-named due to the historical placement of the Church within the estate of Foleshill, first mentioned in 1086, as an estate owned by Lady Godiva.

The canal towpath can be accessed from the Old Church Road canal bridge.

Shops in Proffitt Avenue include a betting shop, a Chinese takeaway, a beauty salon, a hairdresser and a newsagent.
