= Warwickshire ring =

Canal ring in England

Coordinates: 52.6209°N 1.7093°W

Warwickshire Ring
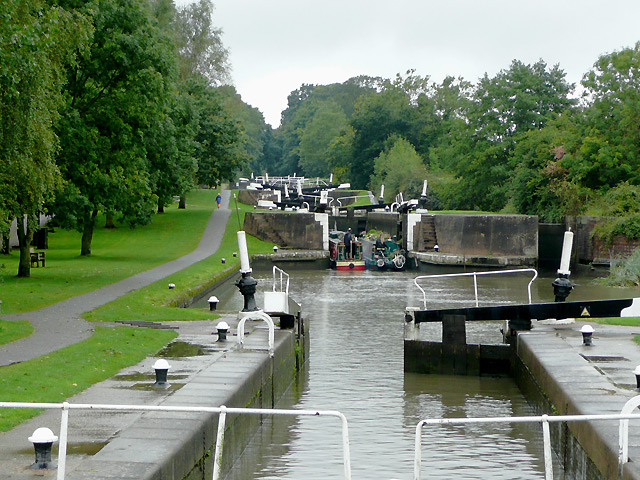
- Two boats entering lock 44 of the Hatton flight, the third from the top
- Interactive map of Warwickshire Ring

Specifications
- Length: 116 miles (187 km)
- Locks: 105
- Status: Canal ring
- Navigation authority: Canal & River Trust

The Warwickshire ring is a connected series of canals forming a circuit around the West Midlands area of England. The ring is formed from the Coventry Canal, the Oxford Canal, the Grand Union Canal, the Stratford-upon-Avon Canal and the Birmingham and Fazeley Canal. It is a popular route with tourists due to its circular route and mixture of urban and rural landscapes.

The ring totals 106 miles and has 115 locks, although there are two alternative routes through the southern part of Birmingham - from Kingswood Junction, one route follows the Grand Union Canal to Salford Junction, where it joins the Birmingham and Fazeley Canal, and the other follows the Stratford Canal (north) and Worcester and Birmingham Canal to Gas Street Basin in central Birmingham. The latter route is slightly longer and has more locks, but many consider it to be more scenic and interesting.

== Route ==
There is something of everything, in canal terms, around the Warwickshire Ring. There are wide beam and narrowbeam locks; there is idyllic open rolling countryside, and the grimness of industry, some of it removed, some of it improved, and some of it still there in all its awfulness. There are tourist honeypot sites, like Warwick Castle, and there are world class attractions like Drayton Manor Theme Park.

The ring is made up of parts of four canals.

- Grand Union Canal
- Birmingham and Fazeley Canal
- Coventry Canal
- Oxford Canal

=== Grand Union Canal ===
Starting at Braunston Turn, the route heads west along the Grand Union Main Line for five miles to Napton Junction, through pleasant farm land. The only village close to the canal is Lower Shuckburgh. This section was originally owned by the Oxford Canal. At Napton Junction, the Oxford Canal continues straight ahead, but the ring turns to the north, passing Napton Reservoirs on the left before descending through the first three locks at Calcutt. Prior to 1929, this section was owned by the Warwick and Napton Canal company, which amalgamated with several other companies to form the Grand Union Canal. One immediate benefit was a plan costing £881,000 to widen the locks. The original narrow locks, replaced by three wide beam ones in the 1930s, are still there alongside.

Turning westward, the canal heads towards Stockton locks. These eight locks carry the canal downhill to Long Itchington, and again the old narrow locks are still visible. After two more isolated locks, there are the Bascote four, with the top two forming a staircase. Six more locks take the canal on to the floor of the Leam (pronounced "Lem") and Avon valleys. At Royal Leamington Spa, the ornamental Jephson Gardens commemorate Dr. Jephson, who lived from 1798 to 1878, who worked hard to establish the medical reputation of the spa, while tourist attractions at Warwick include the fourteenth century Warwick Castle, which is set in grounds laid out by the landscape architect Capability Brown.

The climb out of the Avon Valley begins at the two Cape Locks, where the Cape of Good Hope pub serves a locally brewed ale called Two Locks, on account of the brewery being two locks down from the pub. The route then turns right onto the line of the Warwick and Birmingham Canal, another of the constituent canals that made up the Grand Union Canal. To the left Saltisford Basin is run by a Canal Trust; it once led to the terminus of the Warwick and Birmingham Canal, prior to the construction of the Warwick and Napton Canal.

After climbing a few of the 21 Hatton Locks, the view opens up to show the enormous locks climbing the hill in an unbroken line westwards. Although heavy to operate, the locks fill and empty quickly. From Hatton top, there is a ten-mile respite from locks, punctuated by the 443-yard (405 m) Shrewley Tunnel, which passes under Shrewley village. The tunnel, which has a towpath and is wide enough to allow two 7-foot (2.1 m) boats to pass each other, emerges near to the village centre.

At Kingswood Junction, there is a choice of route. For those intending to go to Gas Street and Birmingham city centre, the narrowbeam Stratford-on-Avon Canal offers more locks and a longer passage, but for boaters going straight round the ring, the main line route is shorter and quicker. The five locks at Knowle raise the canal to its summit. They replaced six narrow locks in 1930, the remains of which can still be seen to one side of the channel, and are the last wide locks before Birmingham. After passing under the M42 motorway, an aqueduct carries the canal over the River Blythe, before it turns to the west near Solihull. The journey through Solihull is in a deep leafy cutting, shielding the boater from urban views. Trees then give way to disused wharves and housing estates.

The six Camp Hill locks are narrow beam and drop the canal down to Bordesley Junction, where the Warwickshire Ring turns to the right. Ahead is the route to Digbeth Basin: in the 1930s it was the Birmingham Hub of a national canal transport system. There are bonded warehouses, an ice house, a major Fellows Moreton & Clayton warehouse, a banana warehouse and in Typhoo Basin, a tea warehouse.

From Bordesley Junction, Saltley Cut was reviled as the filthiest place on the whole canal system, with gas works, a power station, railway works and a chemical works all generating or receiving cargoes, and discharging waste into the canal. It has been cleaned up now, and there is new housing facing the waterfront.

The five Garrison Locks lower the canal into the valley of the River Rea, which it crosses on an aqueduct. The Rea is a tributary of the River Tame, which it also crosses just before Salford Junction, where the Grand Union Canal meets the Birmingham and Fazeley Canal and the Tame Valley Canal. Nechells Shallow Lock once controlled the exit from the Grand Union Canal, but is no longer fitted with gates. The junction and the aqueduct are overshadowed by the road decks of spaghetti junction, which tower above them.

=== Birmingham and Fazeley Canal ===
At Salford Junction, boaters following the Warwickshire Ring turn to the right onto the Birmingham and Fazeley Canal, which is sandwiched between the backs of factories and the M6 motorway. The route passes a major electricity high voltage distribution centre on the south bank, before reaching Erdington Hall, where a factory has been built over the canal, almost forming a tunnel, although one side remains open to the light. Close by was Fort Dunlop, where the Dunlop Rubber company made pneumatic tyres, employing 10,000 workers at the peak of production in the 1950s.

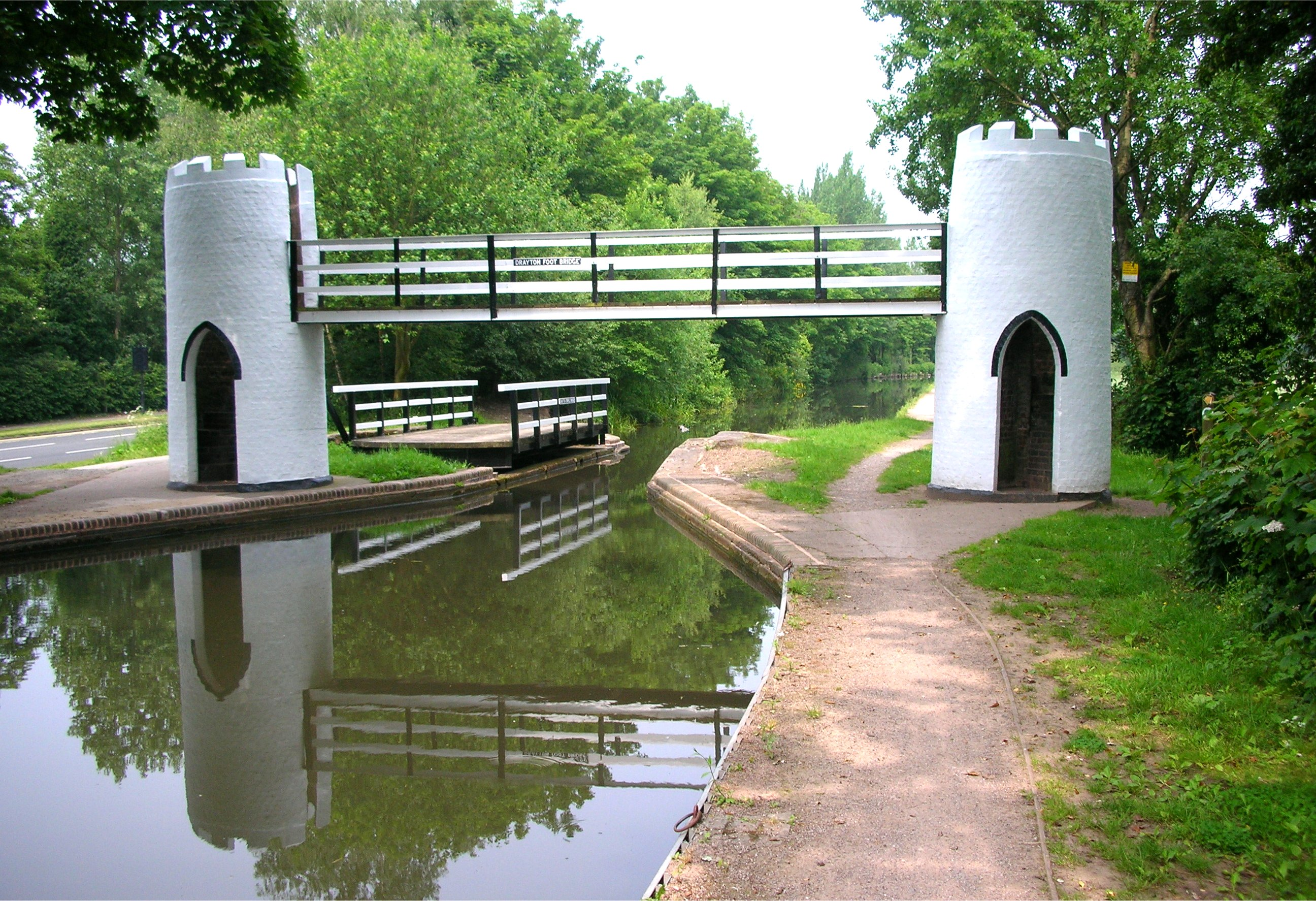
The folly-like footbridge and adjacent swing bridge at Drayton Bassett, one mile from Fazeley Junction.

Eventually the canal re-emerges into the comparative calm of Minworth, where three locks lower the level of the canal. To the south is Minworth Sewage Treatment Works, one of the largest in Britain, capable of treating 220 million gallons (1000 Megalitres) per day. The canal continues through a cutting lined with trees, through the short Curdworth tunnel, which is 57 yards (52 m) long, to pass under the M6 Toll motorway. The first of the eleven Curdworth locks is immediately after the bridge, and the canal continues through open countryside and flooded gravel pits, although the M42 motorway is never far away to the east.

Some of the gravel pits have been landscaped to form Kingsbury Water Park, which covers 600 acres (240 ha) and contains 30 lakes and pools, providing activities including walking, nature trails, sailing, windsurfing, power boating and horse riding. There is also a children's farm at Broomey Croft. At Fazeley, the canal runs alongside Drayton Manor Theme Park, and crosses Bourne Brook, another tributary of the River Tame, to arrive at Fazeley Junction and the Coventry Canal.

=== Coventry Canal ===
The section of the Coventry Canal which turns to the left was actually built by the Birmingham and Fazeley Canal, because the Coventry Canal ran out of money. However, the Warwickshire Ring turns to the right, along the section built before the shortage of capital occurred. Near the junction is Fazeley Mill, which began making tape in 1886, and has continued to use the same processes ever since. There is also a mill which was built to Richard Arkwright's pattern in 1791, and is one of the best surviving mills of its type.

A large aqueduct carries the canal over the River Tame, after which it is bordered by the houses and factories of Tamworth. Between the 1930s and 2001, the Reliant Car Company was based in Tamworth, and manufactured Reliant Robin cars beside the canal. Tamworth also has a castle, which exhibits a wide mix of architectural styles. The motte is Norman, the timbered hall is Elizabethan and the apartments are Jacobean.

Two locks raise the level of the canal in Tamworth, after which there is a long level section. Once beyond the housing estates of Tamworth, the canal passes the remains of Alvecote Priory and turns to the south-east. After being crossed by the M42 motorway, it joins the valley of the River Anker, which it follows on a ledge on the west side of the valley. It passes through the centre of Polesworth, and is then surrounded by farmland, before it begins to ascend out of the valley to Atherstone, through a flight of eleven narrow locks. Atherstone was a hatting town, where hats were made from Tudor times, including many for the armies of the world. Towards the end of the twentieth century, hats went out of fashion, and the economy of the town declined. Mercury was used to make certain types of felt, and its toxicity, which affects the brain, led to the expression "Mad as a Hatter".

Between Atherstone and Nuneaton, the canal water is rust coloured, caused by leaching of minerals from the soil, and there are the remains of large granite quarries, many now landscaped and acting as nature reserves. A prominent feature is Mount Judd, a mountain created from waste material from Judkins Quarry.

To the south of Nuneaton is Marston Junction, where the Ashby Canal joins, and beyond that, the canal skirts the eastern edge of Bedworth in a long cutting. Shortly afterwards, the canal reaches Hawkesbury Junction, where the Coventry Canal continues for another 5.5 miles (8.9 km) into the centre of Coventry, and the Oxford Canal turns off to the south-east. Originally, the junction was a little further to the south at Longford.

At Hawkesbury Junction there is an old engine house, a graceful curved bridge and the Greyhound pub. Although not part of the Warwickshire Ring, the route into Coventry is a flagship of urban regeneration. The towpath has been cleaned up, resurfaced, lit, policed, and adorned with sculptures and other works of art, and is now a thoroughly pleasant place to walk or cruise. The journey is like a catalogue for a historic vehicle rally, for manufactured here were Daimlers, Rileys, Hillmans and Humbers.

Access to Coventry Basin is through a tiny bridge hole, which was designed so that it could be sealed off each evening by a large wooden beam. The basin has been beautifully and sympathetically restored, with new retail units blending seamlessly with buildings from another era. The focal point is a more than life sized statue of James Brindley standing in the centre.

=== Oxford Canal ===
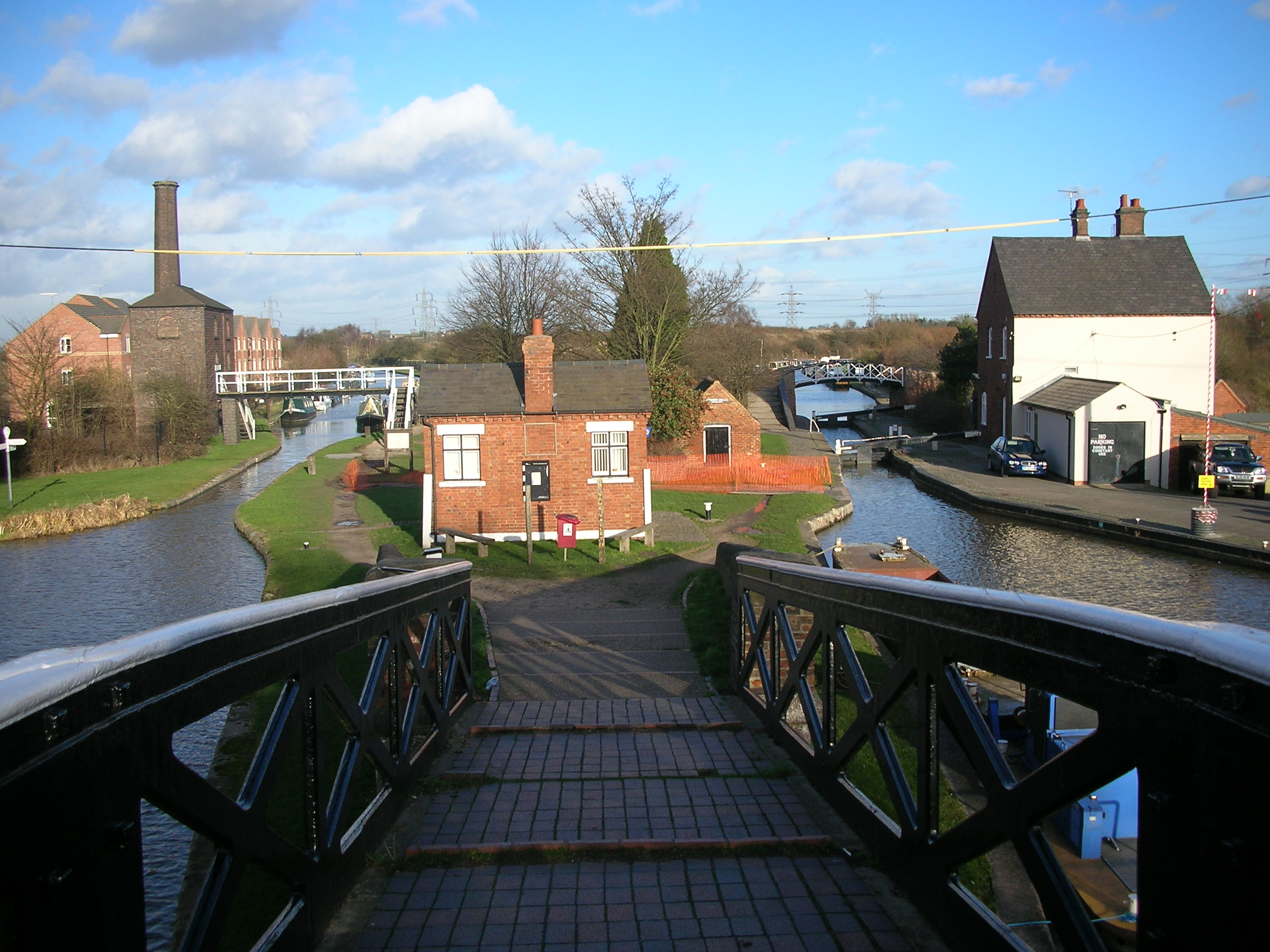
Hawkesbury Junction, where the Oxford Canal (on the right) joins the Coventry Canal

From Hawkesbury Junction, the Oxford Canal twists and turns while generally heading south east, as its engineer James Brindley built a contour canal which closely followed the contours of the land. In the 1820s, it was straightened and shortened by creating cuttings and embankments to make it a better competitor to the railways, and the distance to Braunston was almost reduced from 36 miles (58 km) to 22 miles (35 km). Where the original meanderings remain, the towpath is carried over the junction on elegantly engineered cast iron bridges, carrying the inscription "Horseley Ironworks 1828".

Much of the route is rural, although the M69 motorway and the M6 motorway both cross the canal. Brinklow was once served by an arm of the canal, which is now disused, and an aqueduct on the main line near its start has been turned into an embankment by filling in the arches. At Newbold-on-Avon there is a 250-yard (230 m) tunnel, beyond which the scenery is much more urban, although the canal passes to the north-east of Rugby on an embankment, and is separated from it by a railway line.

There is quite a community of boaters and businesses at Hillmorton Locks, which were duplicated in the 1830s to alleviate congestion. The 820-foot (250 m) high Hillmorton Wireless Aerials, built in 1924, are a significant landmark for miles around. Beyond Hillmorton, the canal turns under the railway, and then passes under the M45 motorway, to head for Braunston. The very distinctive spire of Braunston Church is another landmark on the final part of the journey back to the start of the Warwickshire Ring.

== Bibliography ==
- Cumberlidge, Jane (2009). Inland Waterways of Great Britain (8th Ed.). Imray Laurie Norie and Wilson. ISBN 978-1-84623-010-3.
- Hadfield, Charles (1970). The Canals of the East Midlands. David and Charles. ISBN 978-0-7153-4871-0.
- Nicholson (2003). Nicholson Guides Vol 3: Birmingham and the heart of England. Harper Collings. ISBN 978-0-00-713666-7.
