= Coventry Canal =

Canal in Staffordshire, England

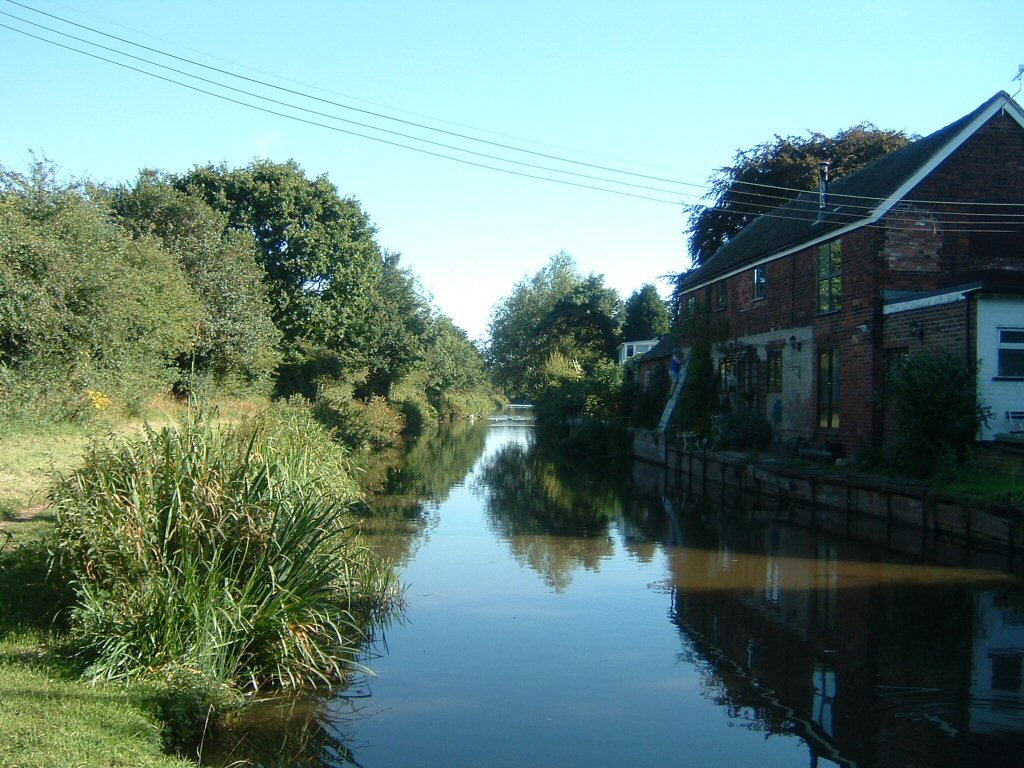
- Coventry canal near Fradley
- Interactive map of Coventry Canal

Specifications
- Locks: 13
- Status: Navigable

History
- Date of act: 1768

Geography
- Connects to: Trent and Mersey Canal

The Coventry Canal is a navigable, narrow canal in England's Midlands.

It starts in Coventry and ends 38 miles (61 km) to the north at Fradley Junction, just north of Lichfield, where it joins the Trent and Mersey Canal. It also connects to the Ashby Canal, the Birmingham and Fazeley Canal, and the Oxford Canal.

Some maps show the canal as northern and southern sections, connected by a stretch of the Birmingham and Fazeley Canal, but others, including the Canal and River Trust, show the through route as the Coventry Canal. This reflects a complicated period of ownership and re-leasing when the Coventry Canal company was in financial difficulties during construction.

It runs through or past the towns of Bedworth, Nuneaton, Atherstone, Polesworth and Tamworth. It is navigable for boats up to 21.9 m (72 ft) in length, 2.1 m (7 ft) in beam, and 1.98 m (6 ft 6 in) in headroom. It forms part of the Warwickshire ring.

== Route in detail ==
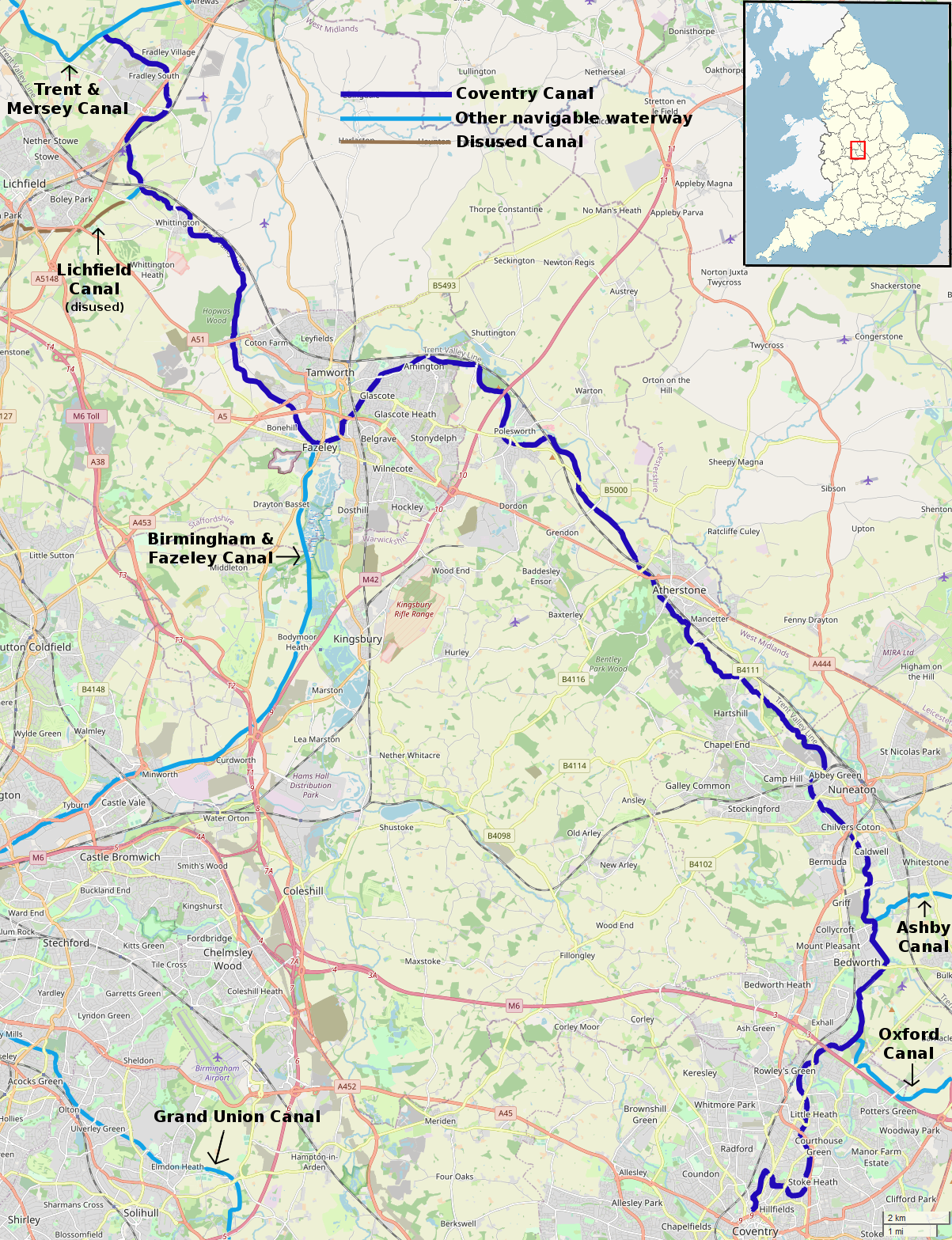
Geographic map of the Coventry Canal (zoom in to see detail)

The canal starts at Coventry Canal Basin. The basin was opened in 1769 and expanded in 1788. It is situated just north of Coventry City Centre and just outside the city's inner ring road. Many of the buildings and the site were restored between 1993 and 1995. The Canal Bridge, Canal House, and the warehouses are Grade II listed buildings. All boats entering and leaving Coventry Canal Basin must pass through the Canal Bridge.

From the canal basin, the canal meanders north through Coventry, passing under many road bridges, including prominent hump-back bridges under Foleshill Road (Foleshill) and Longford Road (Longford), through Little Heath.

Five miles north of Coventry, at Hawkesbury Junction, a superbly preserved iron bridge crosses the start of the Oxford Canal, which journeys southwards to join the River Thames at Oxford. At Hawkesbury Junction, buildings remain from the canal's working days, and the Greyhound pub is a traditional stop for boaters. Hawkesbury Junction is also known to regular boaters as Sutton Stop, though this strictly refers to the stop lock a short distance along the Oxford Canal.

A few miles north of Hawkesbury, just outside Bedworth, is Marston Junction, where the Ashby-de-la-Zouch Canal starts its meandering, rural, lock-free journey towards the former coal mines at Moira. However, it is now navigable only for 22 miles (35 km) to Snarestone.

From Marston Junction, the Coventry Canal runs north-west through Nuneaton, Atherstone, and Polesworth to Tamworth. At Atherstone, a set of 11 locks (Top Lock No. 1 to Atherstone Bottom Lock No. 11) lowers the level of the canal 80 feet (24 m) towards Polesworth. The only other locks on the Coventry Canal are the two Glascote locks, which lower the canal level a further 13 feet 8 inches (4.2 m) over about one mile (1.6 km) before Fazeley Junction.

In a suburb of Tamworth, at Fazeley Junction, boaters can turn south towards Birmingham along the Birmingham & Fazeley Canal.

The Coventry Canal continues north to Fradley Junction, where it joins the Trent and Mersey Canal. From Fazeley to a point halfway to Fradley, some maps show the canal as the "Birmingham and Fazeley Canal" (see History).

== History ==
Coventry Canal Act 1768
- Act of Parliament
- Parliament of Great Britain
- Long title: An Act for making and maintaining a Navigable Canal from the City of Coventry, to communicate, upon Fradley Health in the County of Stafford, with a Canal now making between the Rivers Trent and Mersey.
- Citation: 8 Geo. 3. c. 36
- Territorial extent: Great Britain

Dates
- Royal assent: 29 January 1768
- Commencement: 24 November 1767 (Note: Start of session.)
Other legislation
Amended by	Coventry Canal Navigation Act 1819; Coventry Canal Navigation Act 1881
Relates to	Coventry Canal Act 1786

Status: Amended

Text of statute as originally enacted

Coventry Canal Act 1786
- Act of Parliament
- Parliament of Great Britain
- Long title: An Act to enable the Company of Proprietors of the Coventry Canal Navigation, to complete the said Canal to Fradley Heath in the County of Stafford, and for other Purposes therein mentioned.
- Citation: 26 Geo. 3. c. 30
- Territorial extent: Great Britain

Dates
- Royal assent: 22 May 1786
- Commencement: 24 January 1786
Other legislation
Relates to	Coventry Canal Act 1768; Coventry Canal Navigation Act 1819; Coventry Canal Navigation Act 1881

Status: Current legislation

Text of statute as originally enacted

The Coventry Canal Company was formed by the Coventry Canal Act 1768 (8 Geo. 3. c. 36). James Brindley was commissioned to build the canal, and work started on it in December that year. Because of the high construction standards Brindley demanded, the canal company ran out of money by the time the canal reached Atherstone in 1769, and Thomas Yeoman replaced Brindley.

Thomas Dadford advised on the canal's aqueduct over the River Tame (now known as Tame Aqueduct) in 1784, and in June 1785 Thomas Sheasby was awarded the contract to connect the Coventry Canal to the Trent and Mersey Canal.

Although the canal reached the Birmingham and Fazeley Canal at Fazeley, the final Parliament-approved stretch to the Trent and Mersey at Fradley was not finished until 1789.

The Trent and Mersey Company, and the Birmingham and Fazeley Company, anxious to allow through traffic between Birmingham and the Trent and Mersey Canal, gained permission to complete and operate the approved but unbuilt section from Fazeley to Fradley. The B&F worked north from Fazeley, and the T&M worked south from Fradley. The full length from Coventry to Fradley was opened in 1789.

The Coventry Canal Company later bought the northern section, nowadays sometimes referred to as Coventry Canal (detached portion). In contrast, the middle section remained under the ownership of the Birmingham and Fazeley Canal. Thus, some maps show this middle section as the Birmingham and Fazeley Canal, but others describe the complete route as the Coventry Canal. The Canal and River Trust, which manages the canal, describes the whole route from Coventry to the Trent and Mersey Canal as the Coventry Canal.

== Operation ==
The Coventry Canal was a vital trade artery for many years. In particular, it was part of a Birmingham–London route via the Birmingham and Fazeley Canal, Coventry Canal, Oxford Canal, and the River Thames.

When the Grand Junction Canal and some smaller companies (which much later merged to form the Grand Union Canal company) opened a direct rival route from Birmingham to London, via Warwick, Napton, Braunston, and Bletchley, trade remained high on the Coventry. This was partly because the Oxford company shortened its route north of Braunston, and because Grand Junction traffic using the Braunston–Fazeley route avoided the high tolls charged by the Oxford Canal company on its Braunston–Napton section (which was also part of the new route).

The Coventry Canal paid a dividend right up to 1947 and remained navigable to the present day. Today, the canal is also a popular route for narrowboat trips. Many tourists hire narrowboats to explore Coventry's industrial heritage.

It was nationalised in 1948 and operated first by the British Transport Commission and then by the British Waterways Board, the forerunner of the Canal & River Trust.

In 1957, the Coventry Canal Society was established to promote the proper use and maintenance of the canal and to protect its interests. The canal serves as a base for Mercia Canoe Club, which is part of the Coventry Canal Society.

== Features ==
Point	Coordinates
Fradley Junction	52.7236°N 1.7934°W
Bell bridge (A38/Ryknild Street)	52.7113°N 1.7658°W
Huddlesford Junction	52.6831°N 1.7769°W
Fazeley Junction	52.6154°N 1.7010°W
Tame Aqueduct	52.6176°N 1.6920°W
Glascote Basin	52.6362°N 1.6356°W
Baddesley Basin	52.5832°N 1.5612°W
Mill Bridge (Polesworth)	52.6158°N 1.6167°W
Atherstone Top Lock	52.5748°N 1.5509°W
Marston Junction	52.4902°N 1.4592°W
Hawkesbury Junction	52.4578°N 1.4690°W
Coventry Canal Basin	52.4134°N 1.5120°W

== See also ==
- Arbury Canals

== Gallery ==
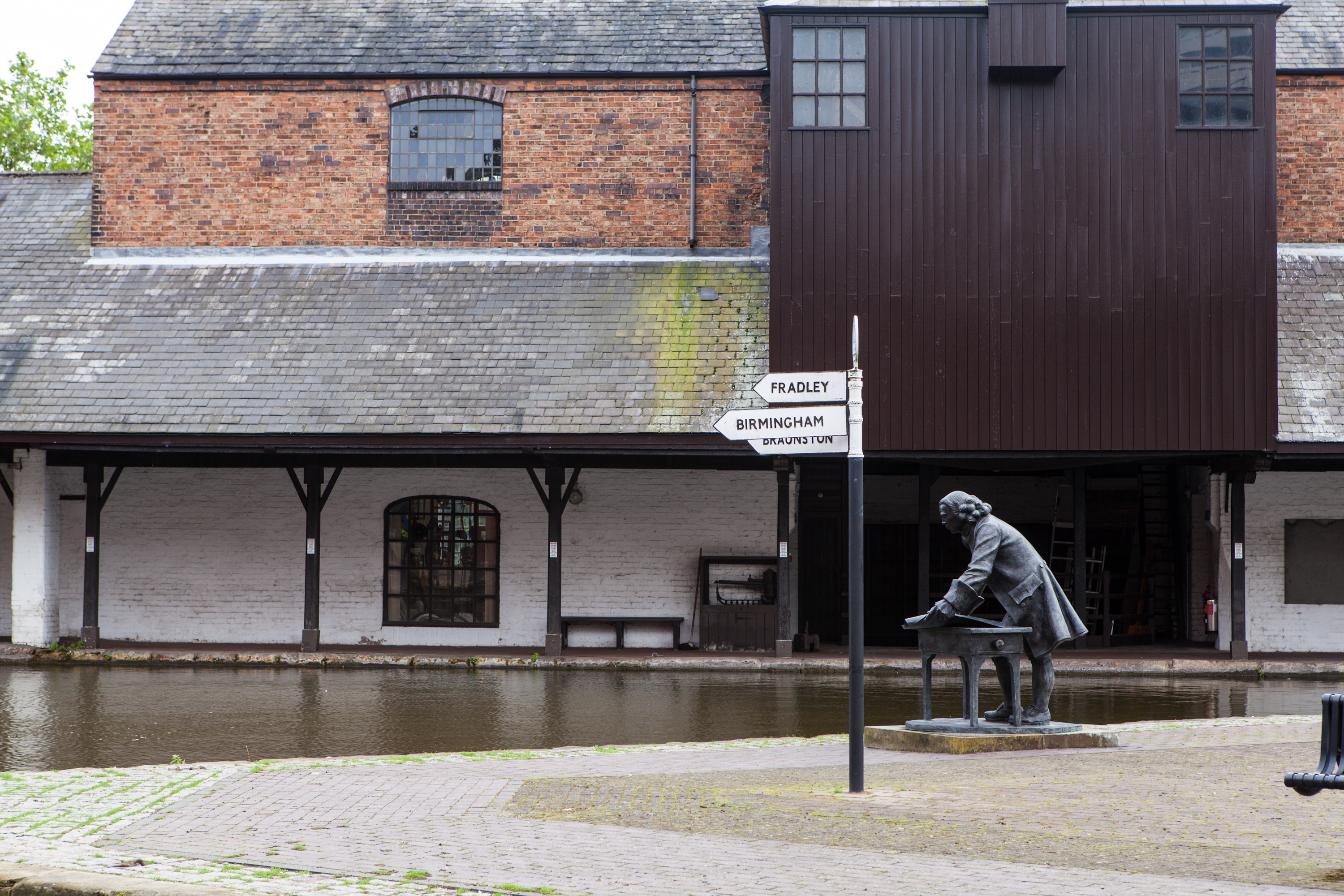
Coventry Canal basin

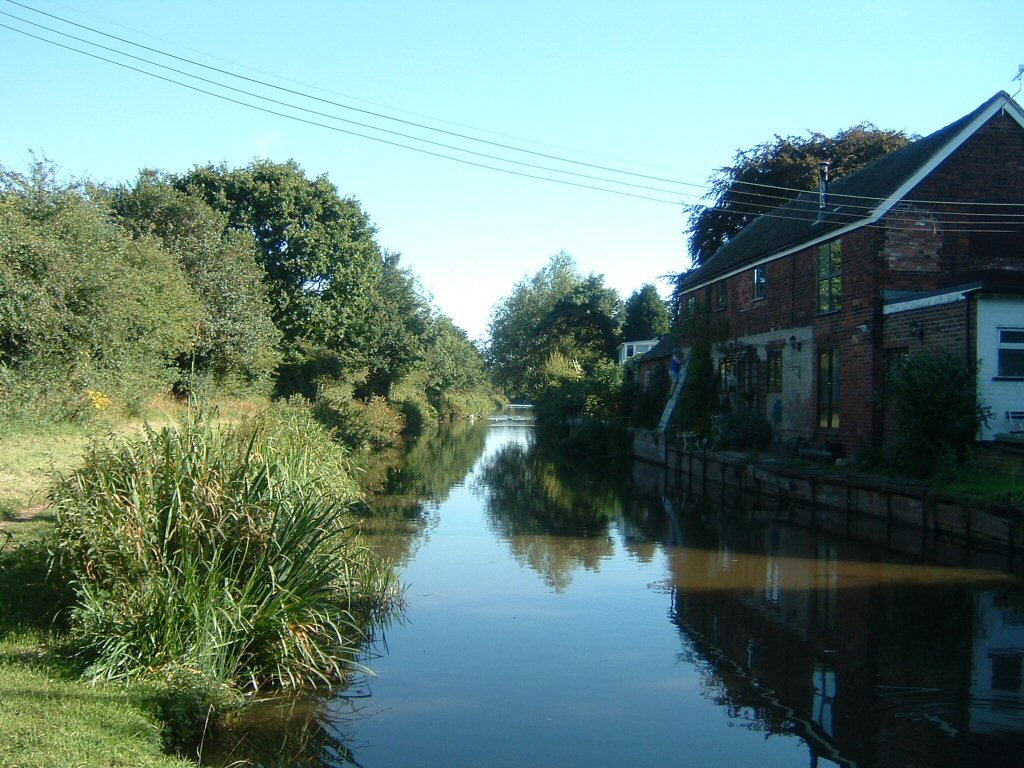
Coventry Canal near Fradley

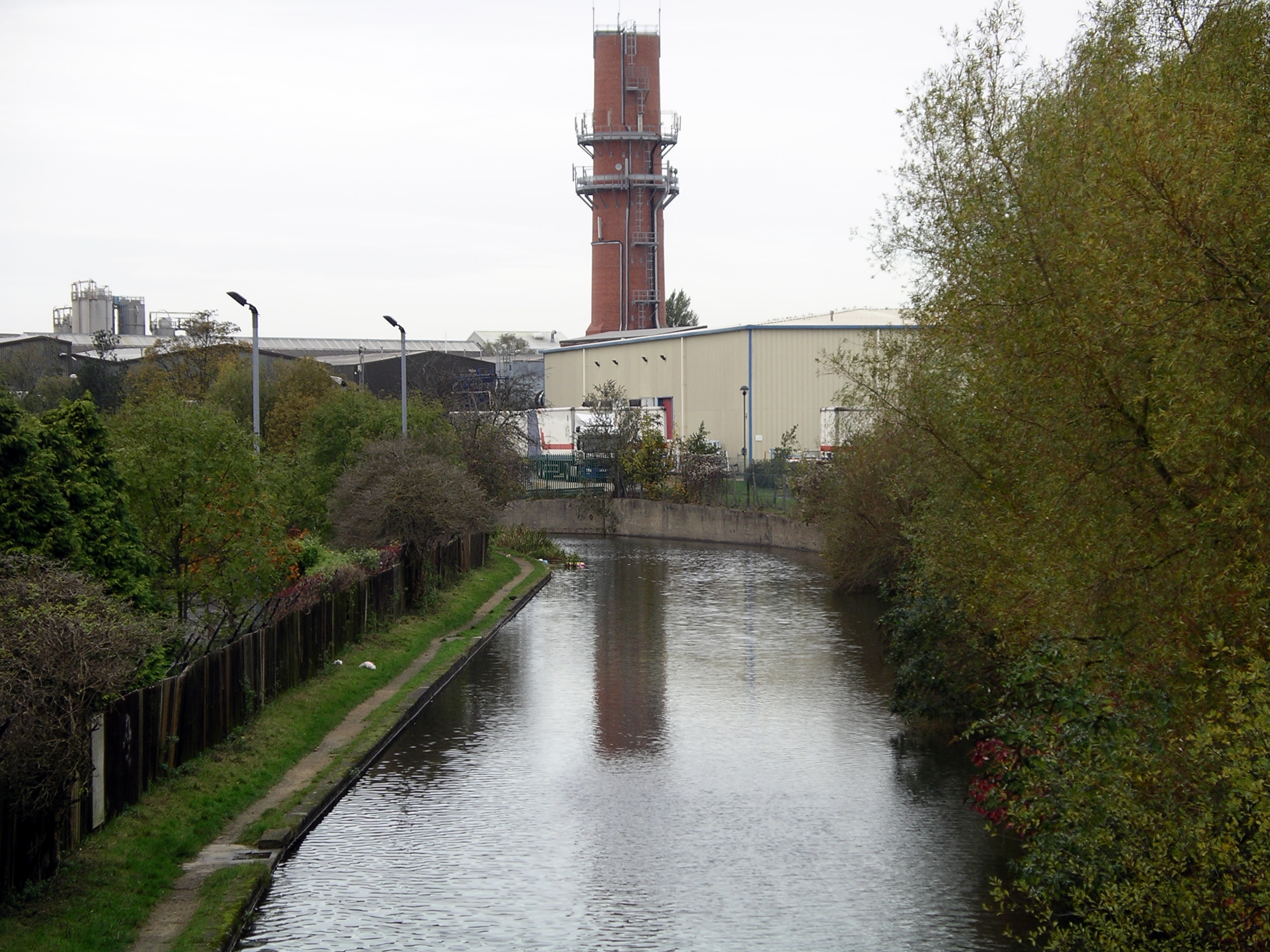
Viewed looking west from Foleshill Road, near Matlock Road

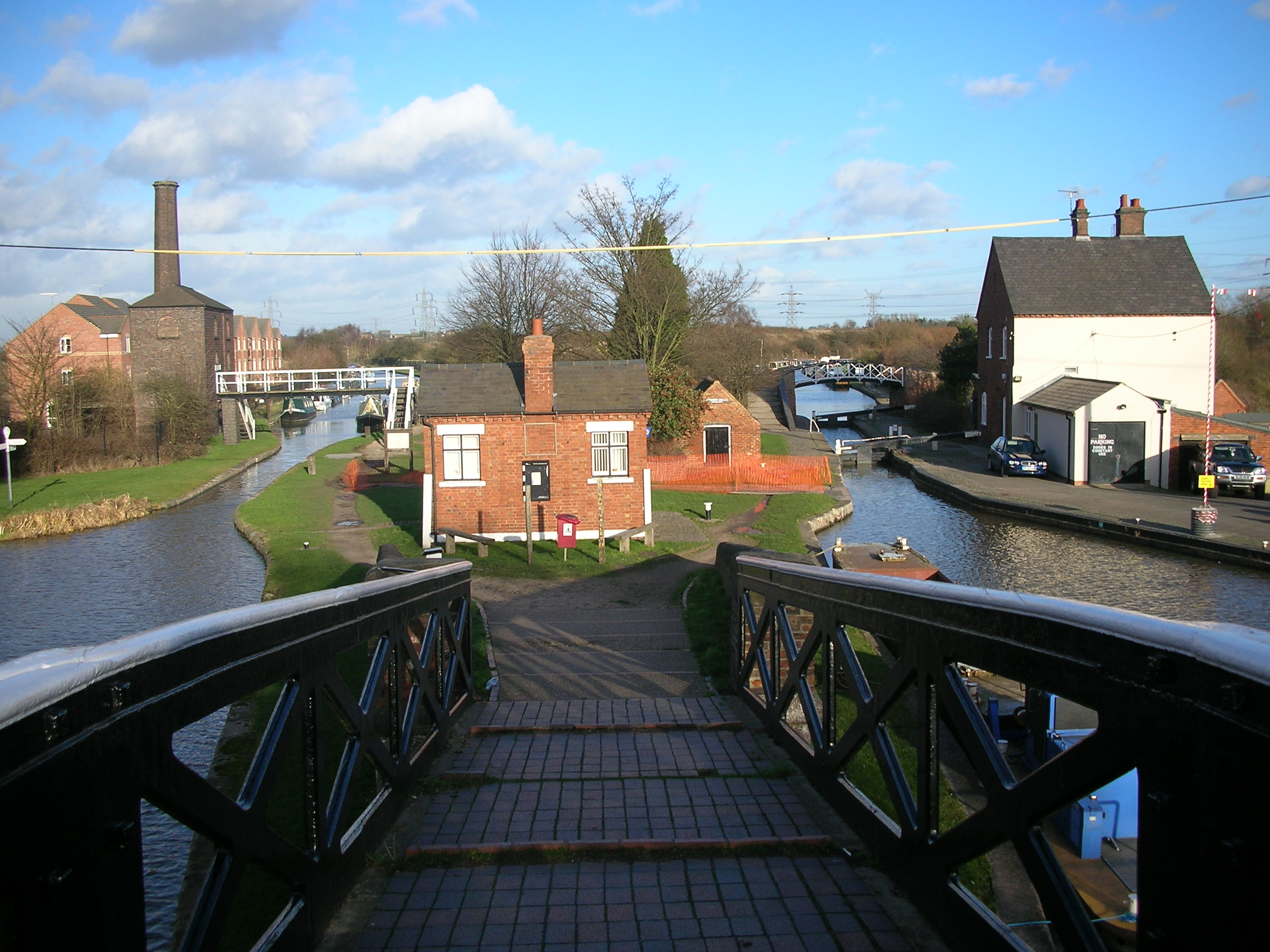
Hawkesbury Junction

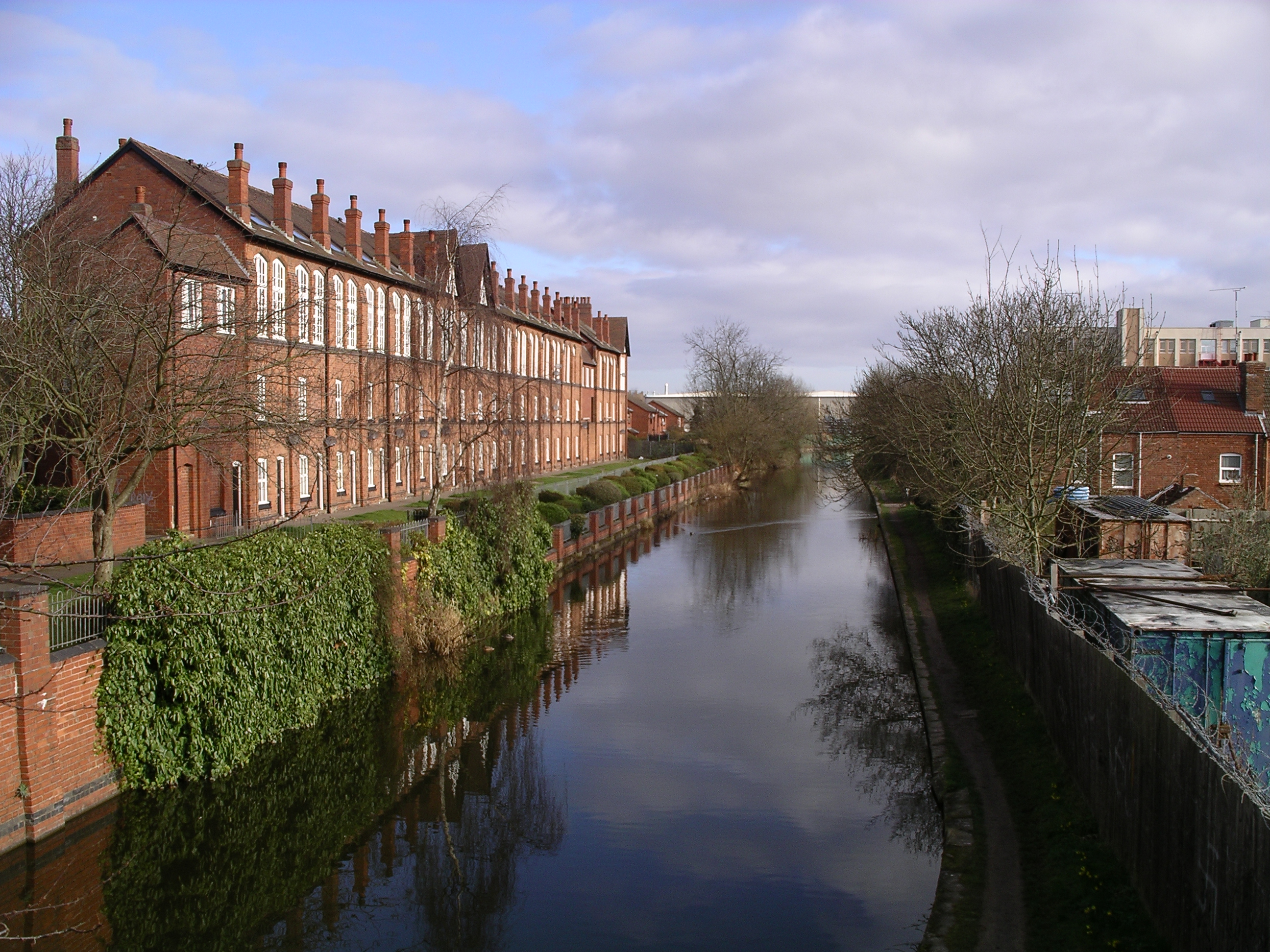
View to the north from Cash's Lane Bridge, Coventry
