= Birmingham and Fazeley Canal =

Canal in the United Kingdom

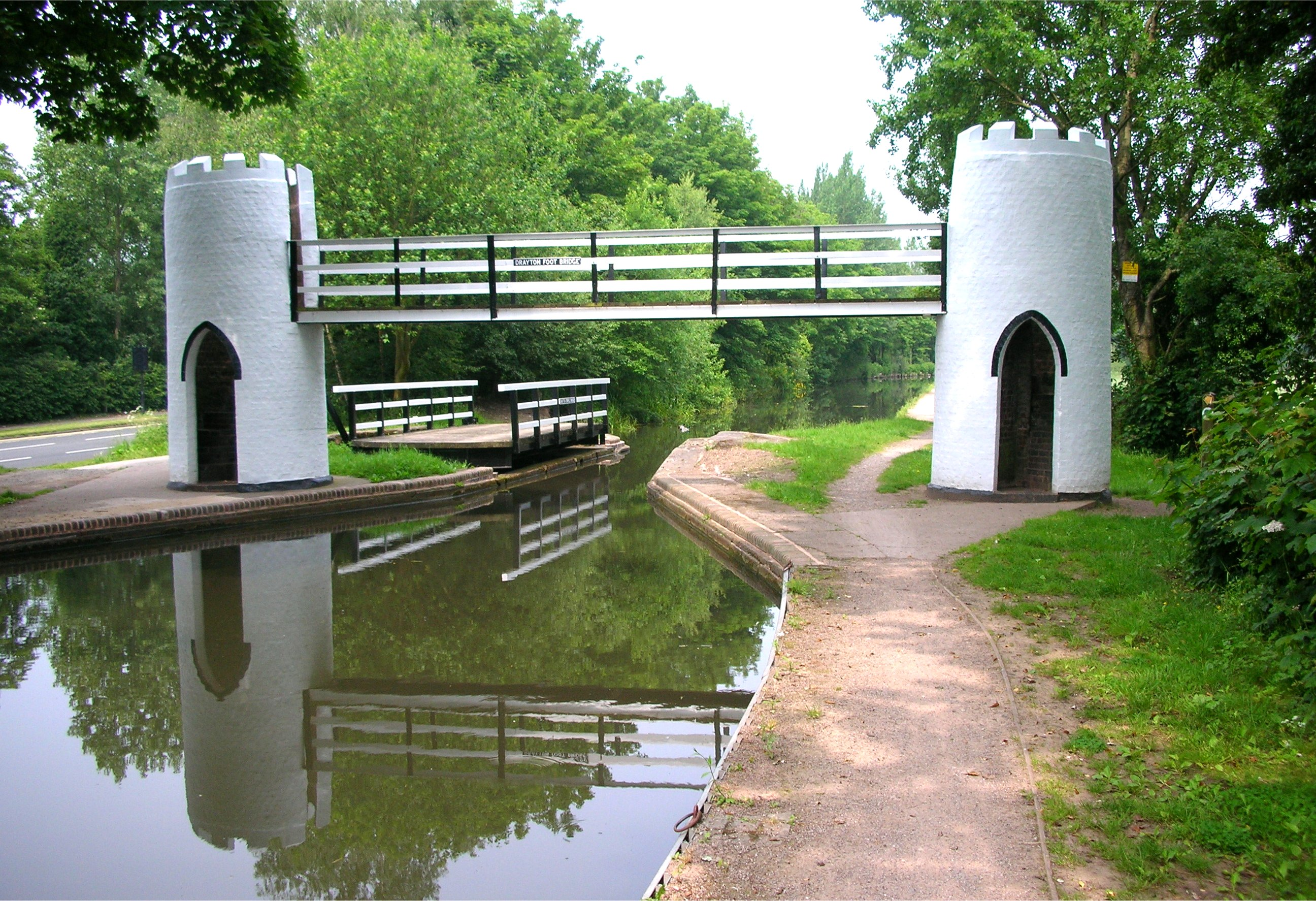
- The folly-like footbridge and adjacent swing bridge at Drayton Bassett, one mile from Fazeley Junction.
- Interactive map of Birmingham and Fazeley Canal

Specifications
- Locks: 44
- Status: Navigable
- Navigation authority: Canal & River Trust

History
- Original owner: Birmingham and Fazeley Canal Company
- Principal engineer: John Smeaton
- Date of act: 1784
- Date completed: 1789

Geography
- Start point: Fazeley Jn, Coventry Canal
- End point: Old Turn Jn, BCN Main Line
- Connects to: BCN Main Line, Coventry Canal, Grand Union Canal, Tame Valley Canal

The Birmingham and Fazeley Canal is a canal of the Birmingham Canal Navigations in the West Midlands of England. Its purpose was to provide a link between the Coventry Canal and Birmingham and thereby connect Birmingham to London via the Oxford Canal.

== History ==
The story of the Birmingham and Fazeley begins in 1770, when the Birmingham Canal Company was seen as having a monopoly. At the time, the coalfields at Walsall did not have canal access, and a public meeting was held at Lichfield on 18 August to discuss an independent link from Walsall to Fradley Junction on the Trent and Mersey Canal, passing through Lichfield. Opposition from local landowners resulted in the plan being shelved, but a further plan was proposed at a meeting held in Warwick in August 1781, for a canal to run from Wednesbury through Fazeley to Atherstone, which was the end of the Coventry Canal at the time. The plans were changed somewhat in October, but shareholders in the Birmingham Canal saw it as a serious threat.

Two bills were put before Parliament in 1782, one for the Birmingham and Fazeley, and a rival one from the Birmingham Canal for a branch from Wednesbury to Walsall. Both sides opposed the other's proposal, and both bills were defeated.

Birmingham and Fazeley Canal Act 1783
- Act of Parliament
- Parliament of Great Britain
- Long title: An Act for making and maintaining a Navigable Canal from a Place near Rider's Green, in the County of Stafford, to Broadwater Fire Engine, and Six Collateral Cuts from the same to several Coal Mines; and also a Navigable Canal from or near the Town of Birmingham, to join the Coventry Canal at or near Fazeley, in the Parish of Tamworth, in the said County of Stafford, with a Collateral Cut to the lower Part of the said Town of Birmingham.
- Citation: 23 Geo. 3. c. 92
- Territorial extent: Great Britain

Dates
- Royal assent: 24 June 1783
- Commencement: 5 December 1782 (Note: Start of session.)
- Repealed: 17 June 1835
Other legislation
Amended by	Birmingham and Fazeley Canal Act 1784
Repealed by	Birmingham Canal Navigations Act 1835

Status: Repealed

Text of statute as originally enacted

Birmingham and Fazeley Canal Act 1784
- Act of Parliament
- Parliament of Great Britain
- Long title: An Act for incorporating the Company of Proprietors of a Canal Navigation, authorized by an Act passed in the Eighth Year of the Reign of His present Majesty King George the Third, to be made from Birmingham to Bilstone and Autherley, with the Company of Proprietors of a Canal Navigation, authorized by an Act passed in the Twenty-third Year of the Reign of His present Majesty, to be made from Birmingham to Fazeley; and for consolidating their Shares, and amending the said last-mentioned Act.
- Citation: 24 Geo. 3. Sess. 2. c. 4
- Territorial extent: Great Britain

Dates
- Royal assent: 16 July 1784
- Commencement: 18 May 1784
- Repealed: 17 June 1835
Other legislation
Amends	Birmingham and Fazeley Canal Act 1783
Repealed by	Birmingham Canal Navigations Act 1835
Relates to	Birmingham Canal Navigation Act 1768; Birmingham and Fazeley Canal Act 1783

Status: Repealed

Text of statute as originally enacted

The promoters then opened negotiations with other canal companies, to ensure that when the canal was built, it would be part of a larger network. In 1782, they obtained an agreement from the Oxford Canal Company that they would complete the route to the River Thames at Oxford, one from the Coventry Canal that they would extend their canal from Atherstone to Fazeley, and agreed that they would complete the Coventry Canal's route from Fazeley as far as Whittington, as the Coventry Canal company could not finance the whole route. The Trent and Mersey would finish that link by building the remainder of the route to Fradley Junction. A second bill was put before Parliament, and at the same time, the Birmingham Canal presented a scheme for a canal from Riders Green to Broadwaters, near Walsall, with eight branches, and a second canal from Newhall to Fazeley. The Birmingham and Fazeley was authorised by an act of Parliament, the Birmingham and Fazeley Canal Act 1783 (23 Geo. 3. c. 92). The new company and the Birmingham Canal were merged soon afterwards by the Birmingham and Fazeley Canal Act 1784 (24 Geo. 3. Sess. 2. c. 4), becoming the awkwardly named Birmingham and Birmingham and Fazeley Canal Company.

John Smeaton was the engineer employed by the Birmingham and Fazeley, but work did not start immediately, as he was also responsible for the Riders Green to Broadwaters line, which was completed first. The project did not go smoothly, as there were disputes between James Bough, the superintendent of the canal company, and Pinkertons, who were the civil engineering contractors employed to carry out the work. The issue concerned the cement that the Pinkertons were using. Work on the Fazeley line began in April 1786, with Bough still acting as superintendent, and the Pinkertons responsible for the construction of the section between Minworth and Fazeley. In late 1786, George Pinkerton found out that the levels, which had been surveyed by Bough, were wrong. Samuel Bull, the engineer for the canal company, investigated and reported that Pinkerton was right. The Pinkertons started to work on the project from January 1787, even though the contracts were not signed until May. Bough made a series of allegations that Pinkertons' workmanship and the materials used were of poor quality.

The company stopped paying Pinkerton in late 1788, as the costs were exceeding the original estimates, and the contract was taken away from them in February 1789. There was then a financial dispute over money which had been paid to Pinkerton as "extras", but which the company then claimed were overpayments. Some £2,750 was at issue, and the case rumbled on for a decade, until a court case in 1801 gave him only £436 of the claim. Unhappy with the outcome, Pinkerton justified his position, but his remarks about John Houghton, the Company Clerk, were deemed to be libellous, for which he was fined and spent some time in prison.

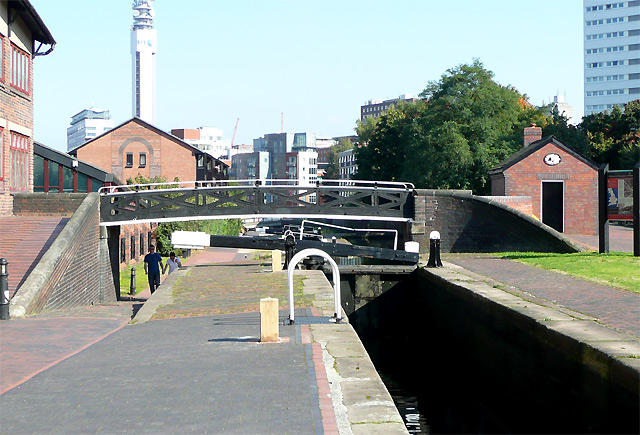
Farmer's Bridge locks. Lock No.1

The canal was completed in August 1789. The benefits of the co-operation with the other canal companies were that when all the links were completed in 1790, it immediately generated a great deal of freight traffic. This created problems, as the flights of locks at Aston and Farmer's Bridge became congested, and this became worse when the Warwick Canal built a junction onto the Digbeth Branch. The problem was not solved until 1844, when the Birmingham and Warwick Junction Canal to the south east and the Tame Valley Canal to the north west were opened. The name of the Birmingham and Birmingham and Fazeley Canal Company was changed to Birmingham Canal Navigations in 1794.

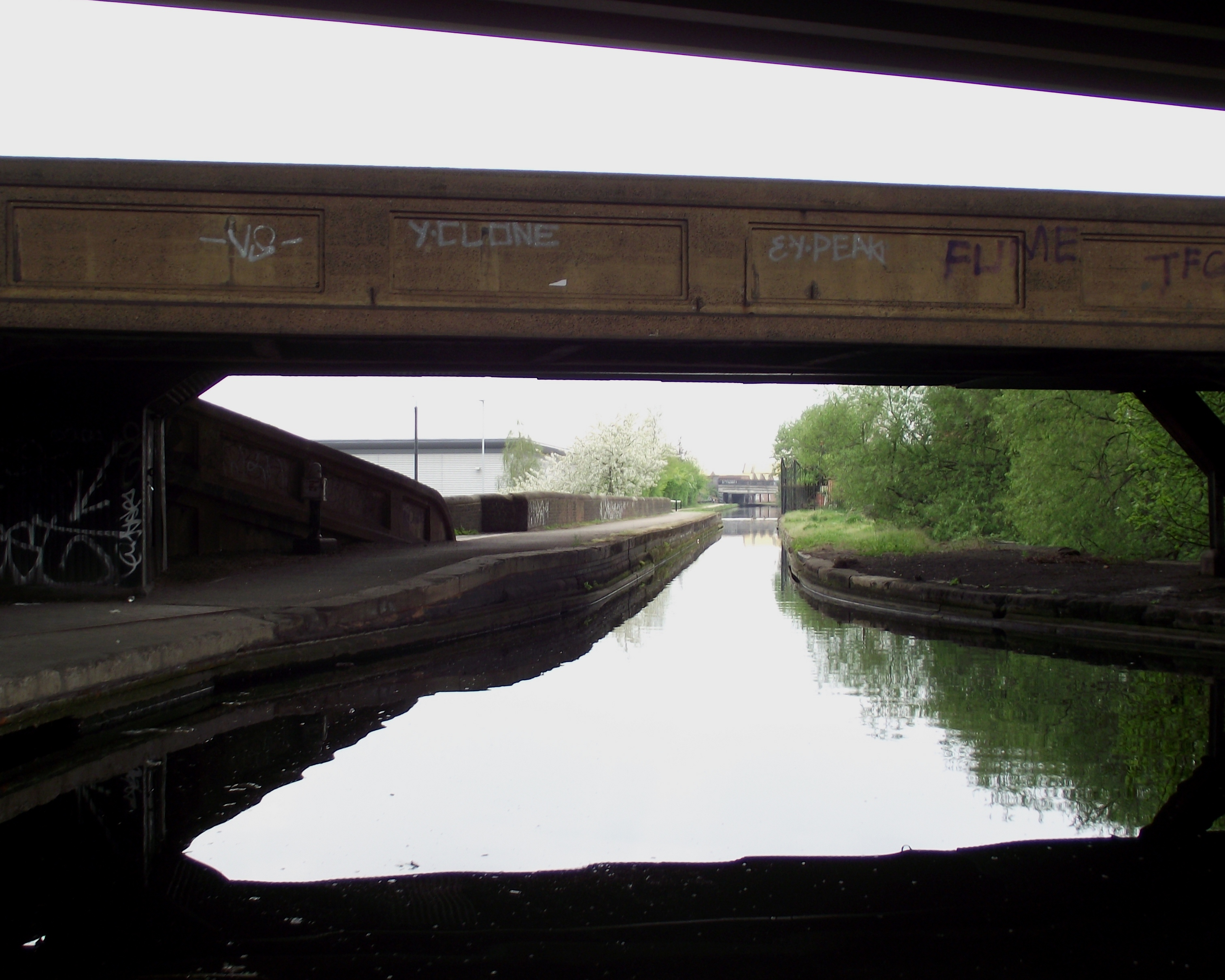
The concrete footbridge of 1926 at Salford Junction

In 1926 the construction of Salford Bridge which spans the River Tame and the Tame Valley Canal at the end of Lichfield Road at the foot of Gravelly Hill resulted in the demolition of the cast-iron roving bridge over the Birmingham and Fazeley Canal, and also four cottages belonging to the canal company. The cast-iron bridge was replaced with a new reinforced concrete bridge and new cottages were erected on the other side of the canal.

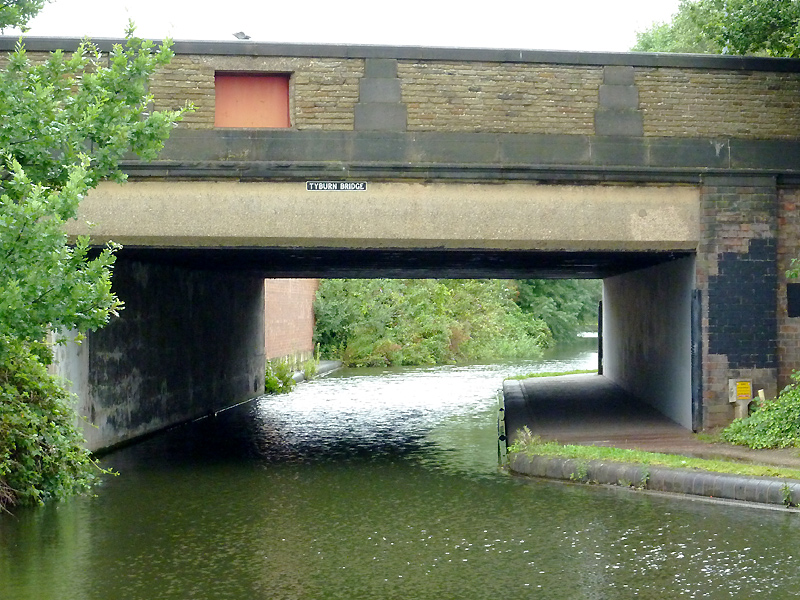
Tyburn Bridge dating from 1934

The bridge over the canal at the junction of Chester Road and Kingsbury Road (Tyburn Bridge) was replaced in 1934.

In 1935 Birmingham Council gained powers to stop up the arm of the canal on the north east side of Summer Row for the development of a new civic centre and the widening of Great Charles Street.

In 1962 Birmingham Council decided to fill in the arm of the canal which ran in Newtown Row, following the drowning of a boy the previous year.

In 1967 a pipeline was laid under the towpath to link the gasworks at Coleshill with the Washwood Heath Works.

In 2019, the Canal & River Trust announced that repair works had started on two locks at Farmer's Bridge Locks as part of a wider £2.5 million programme of repairs across the West Midlands.

In 2022, work started on the "Scotland Works" site opposite Lock 1 of Farmer's Bridge Locks, a former glassworks that is being redeveloped into residential apartments named Lockside Wharf by Consortia Developments and Joseph Mews Property Group. Lockside Wharf will comprise 61 apartments and is currently under construction.

== Route ==
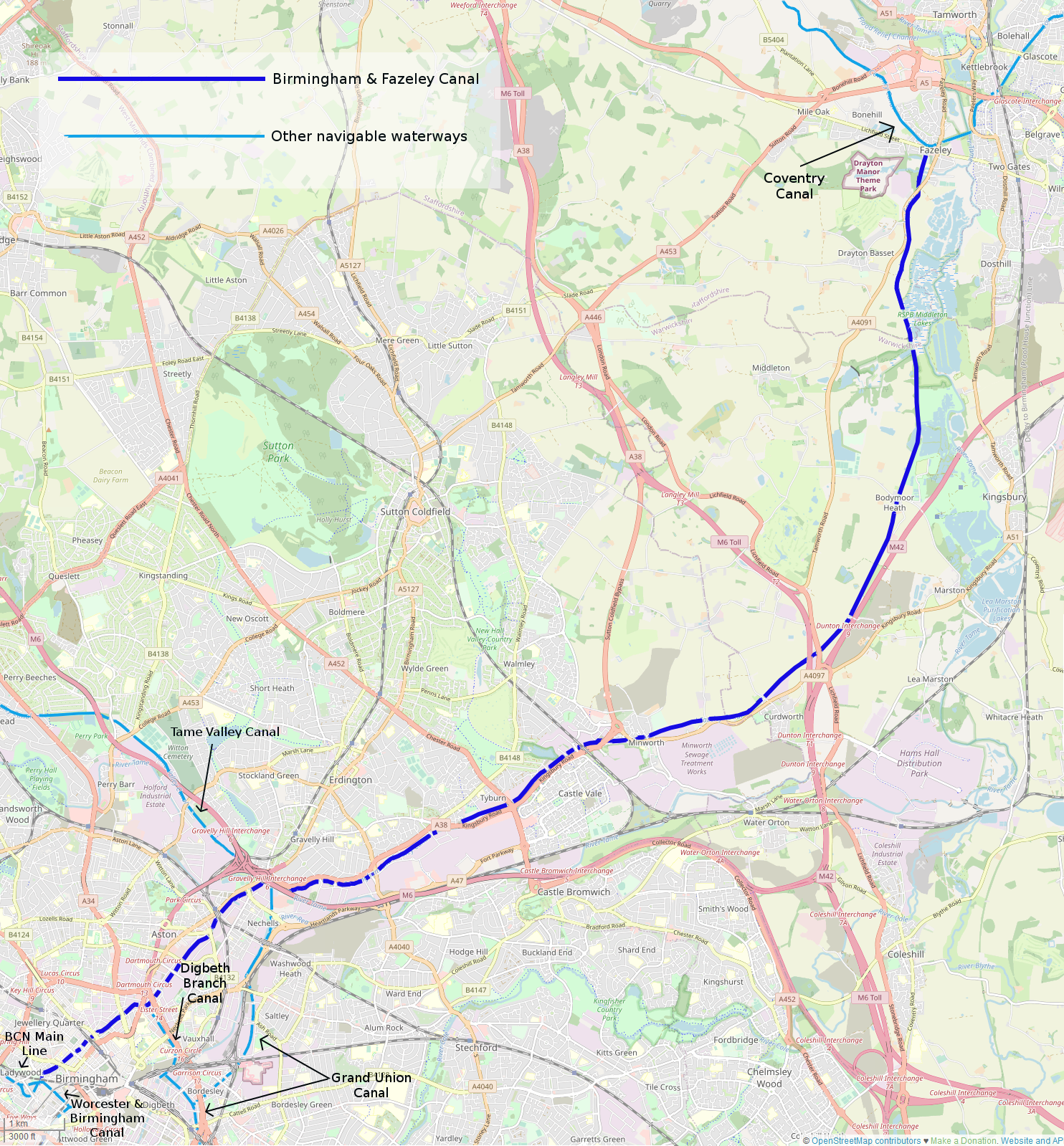
Geographic map of the canal (zoom in to see detail)

The canal is now regarded as running from the BCN Main Line at Old Turn Junction (near the National Indoor Arena), Birmingham to the Coventry Canal at Fazeley Junction, just outside Tamworth. The length of this stretch is 15 miles (24 km), and it includes 38 locks. From Old Turn Junction, 13 locks drop the level of the canal by 81 feet (25 m), after which there is a short flat stretch from St Chads Cathedral to Aston Junction. There is a one-mile (1.6 km) branch called the Digbeth Branch Canal which runs from the junction to Typhoo Basin and contains 6 locks. A short cut runs from near the end of the branch to the Grand Union Canal at Bordesley Junction.

Below the junction there are another 11 locks, which form the Aston flight. Holborn Hill bridge carries the railway to Aston station over the canal, just before the bottom lock of the flight is reached. At Salford Junction, the Tame Valley Canal runs to the north west, and the Grand Union Canal runs southwards, while the Fazeley heads eastwards. Three more locks continue the descent at Minworth, and the character of the surroundings changes from an urban and industrial landscape to open countryside. There is a short 57-yard (52 m) Grade II listed tunnel at Curdworth, after which fields and flooded gravel pits line the canal. At Drayton Bassett, an eccentric Grade II listed footbridge with Gothic-style towers crosses the canal, close to Drayton Manor Theme Park, after which Fazeley is reached, where the canal joins the Coventry Canal.

The 5.5-mile (8.9 km) stretch which extends northwards beyond Fazeley Junction to Whittington, near Lichfield, was built by the Birmingham and Fazeley Canal Company, with the remainder of the route to Fradley Junction being built by the Trent and Mersey Canal. Both sections used the route authorised by the Coventry Canal Act 1768 (8 Geo. 3. c. 36), but although the Coventry Canal subsequently bought back the northern section from the Trent and Mersey Canal, the southern section remained in the ownership of the Birmingham and Fazeley Canal. However, it is often regarded as being part of the Coventry Canal, with the Canal and River Trust quoting the length of that canal as being 38 miles (61 km) which includes the Birmingham and Fazeley section.

Historically the canal started at Farmer's Bridge Top Lock (the real Farmer's Bridge Junction), where it met the already existing Birmingham Canal Newhall Branch. That branch has now been built over, with only Cambrian Wharf surviving.

The Birmingham and Fazeley Canal forms part of the Warwickshire ring.

=== Features ===
At Common lock 10, on the lower lock tail, an inscription can be found in the stonework. It reads: "Pax Missa Per Orbem, Pax Quaeritur Bello", which translates as "Peace Is Sent Throughout The World, Peace Is Sought Through War". The inscription comes from two coins, the first part from the Queen Ann Farthing, and the second part from the Cromwell Broad.

Point	Coordinates (Links to map resources)	OS Grid Ref	Notes
Old Turn Junction	52.4792°N 1.9139°W	SP058868	BCN Main Line
Stour Valley railway tunnel	52.4794°N 1.9138°W	SP058868	Birmingham, Wolverhampton and Stour Valley Railway runs beneath canal
Farmer's Bridge Junction (original)	52.4806°N 1.9125°W	SP059870	Junction with former Birmingham Canal Newhall Branch
Cambrian Wharf basin	52.4806°N 1.9118°W	SP059870	
Newhall Branch (closed)	52.4808°N 1.9110°W	SP060870	
Farmer's Bridge top lock 1	52.4808°N 1.9120°W	SP059870	
Farmer's Bridge lock 2	52.4811°N 1.9110°W	SP06148702	
Farmer's Bridge lock 3	52.4813°N 1.9101°W	SP06208704	
Farmer's Bridge lock 4	52.4815°N 1.9092°W	SP06268706	
Farmer's Bridge lock 5	52.4820°N 1.9082°W	SP06338712	
Farmer's Bridge lock 6	52.4823°N 1.9076°W	SP06378715	
Farmer's Bridge lock 7	52.4826°N 1.9070°W	SP06418719	
Whitmore Arm junction	52.4828°N 1.9067°W	SP06438721	dry
Farmer's Bridge lock 8	52.4829°N 1.9064°W	SP06458722	
Farmer's Bridge lock 9	52.4833°N 1.9057°W	SP06508726	Directly under Newhall Street
Farmer's Bridge lock 10	52.4837°N 1.9050°W	SP06548731	Directly under Brindley House
British Telecom Tower	52.4835°N 1.9043°W	SP06598729	
Farmer's Bridge lock 11	52.4841°N 1.9043°W	SP06598735	
Farmer's Bridge lock 12	52.4851°N 1.9027°W	SP06708746	
Birmingham Snow Hill station bridge	52.4854°N 1.9021°W	SP06748750	
Farmer's Bridge bottom lock 13	52.4859°N 1.9012°W	SP067875	
Aston Expressway (Aston Road)	52.4903°N 1.8894°W	SP075880	
Aston Junction	52.4902°N 1.8887°W	SP075880	Digbeth Branch Canal
Aston top lock 14	52.4904°N 1.8882°W	SP075881	
Aston lock 15	52.4908°N 1.8873°W	SP07748810	
Aston lock 16	52.4913°N 1.8866°W	SP07798816	
Aston lock 17	52.4918°N 1.8859°W	SP07848821	
Aston lock 18	52.4924°N 1.8853°W	SP07888828	
Aston lock 19	52.4929°N 1.8846°W	SP07938833	
Aston lock 20	52.4940°N 1.8833°W	SP08028846	
Aston lock 21	52.4946°N 1.8824°W	SP08088852	
Aston lock 22	52.4986°N 1.8774°W	SP08428897	
Aston lock 23	52.5005°N 1.8733°W	SP08698918	
Aston bottom lock 24	52.5035°N 1.8711°W	SP087895	Cross-City Line
Salford Junction	52.5085°N 1.8591°W	SP095901	Tame Valley Canal, Grand Union Canal
Factory over canal	52.5083°N 1.8449°W	SP105900	150 yards under factory buildings, open on one side
Erdington Hall Bridge	52.5081°N 1.8432°W	SP106900	Original site of bridge
Minworth top lock	52.5225°N 1.7957°W	SP138916	
Minworth middle lock	52.5252°N 1.7904°W	SP142919	
Minworth bottom lock	52.5288°N 1.7775°W	SP150923	
Curdworth Tunnel	52.5364°N 1.7389°W	SP177932	
M6 Toll motorway bridge	52.5411°N 1.7296°W	SP183937	
Curdworth top lock 1	52.5413°N 1.7289°W	SP183937	
Curdworth lock 2	52.5456°N 1.7217°W	SP190942	
Curdworth lock 3	52.5463°N 1.7206°W	SP190943	
Curdworth lock 4	52.5472°N 1.7198°W	SP191944	
Curdworth lock 5	52.5482°N 1.7190°W	SP192945	
Curdworth lock 6	52.5502°N 1.7174°W	SP197947	
Curdworth lock 7	52.5544°N 1.7140°W	SP195952	
Curdworth lock 8	52.5603°N 1.7100°W	SP198959	
Curdworth lock 9	52.5625°N 1.7093°W	SP198961	
Common Lock 10	52.5678°N 1.7064°W	SP200967	
Kigsbury swivel bridge	52.5731°N 1.7036°W	SP200973	
Curdworth bottom lock 11	52.5733°N 1.7035°W	SP202973	
Aqueduct	52.5866°N 1.7051°W	SP199988	Near Middleton Hall
Drayton swivel and ornamental bridges	52.6047°N 1.7065°W	SK198008	
Fazeley Mill Marina	52.6100°N 1.7034°W	SK200014	
Watling Street	52.6151°N 1.7012°W	SK202020	
Fazeley Junction	52.6154°N 1.7010°W	SK202020	Coventry Canal (to Coventry). Continues as de facto B&F to Whittington
Whittington Brook	52.6724°N 1.7556°W	SK165083	Coventry Canal (detached part) to Huddlesford Junction

== Gallery ==
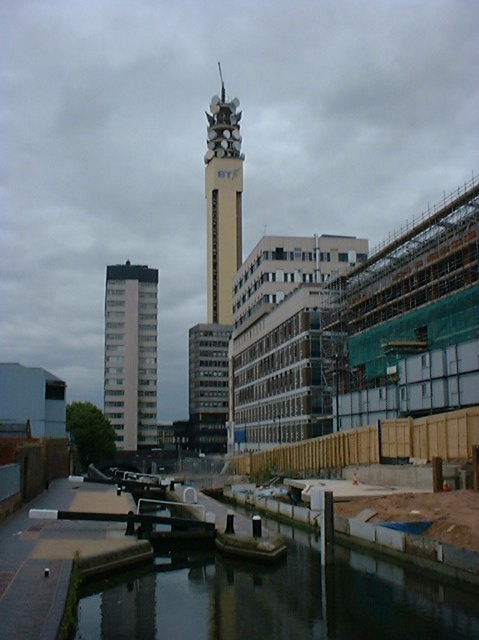
Part of the Farmer's Bridge flight looking towards the BT tower

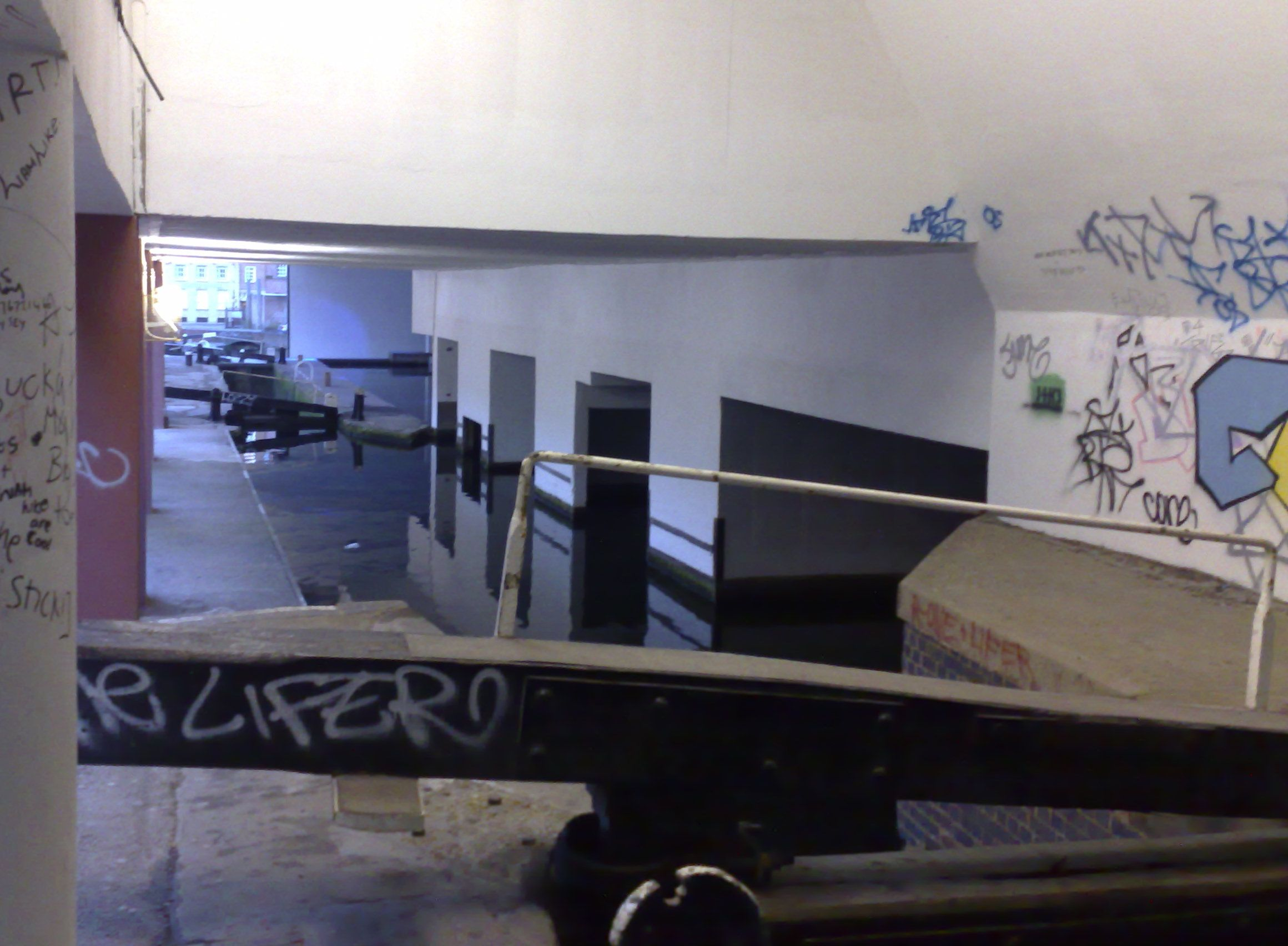
Underneath Brindley House, part of the BT Tower complex

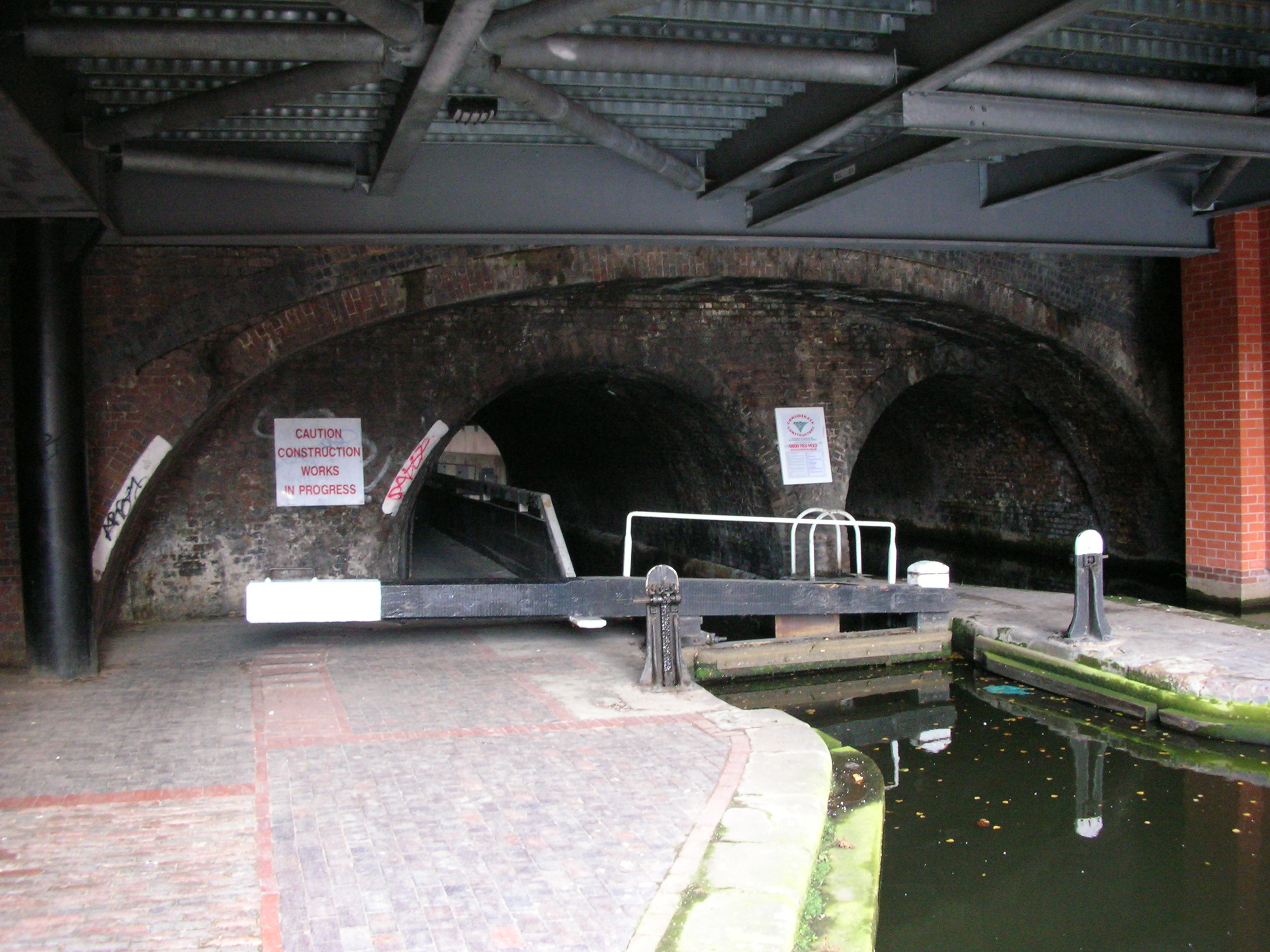
Farmer's Bridge Lock 9 and extended pound, running through two arches of the Newhall Street bridge in central Birmingham. There is a lock gate on either side of the road.

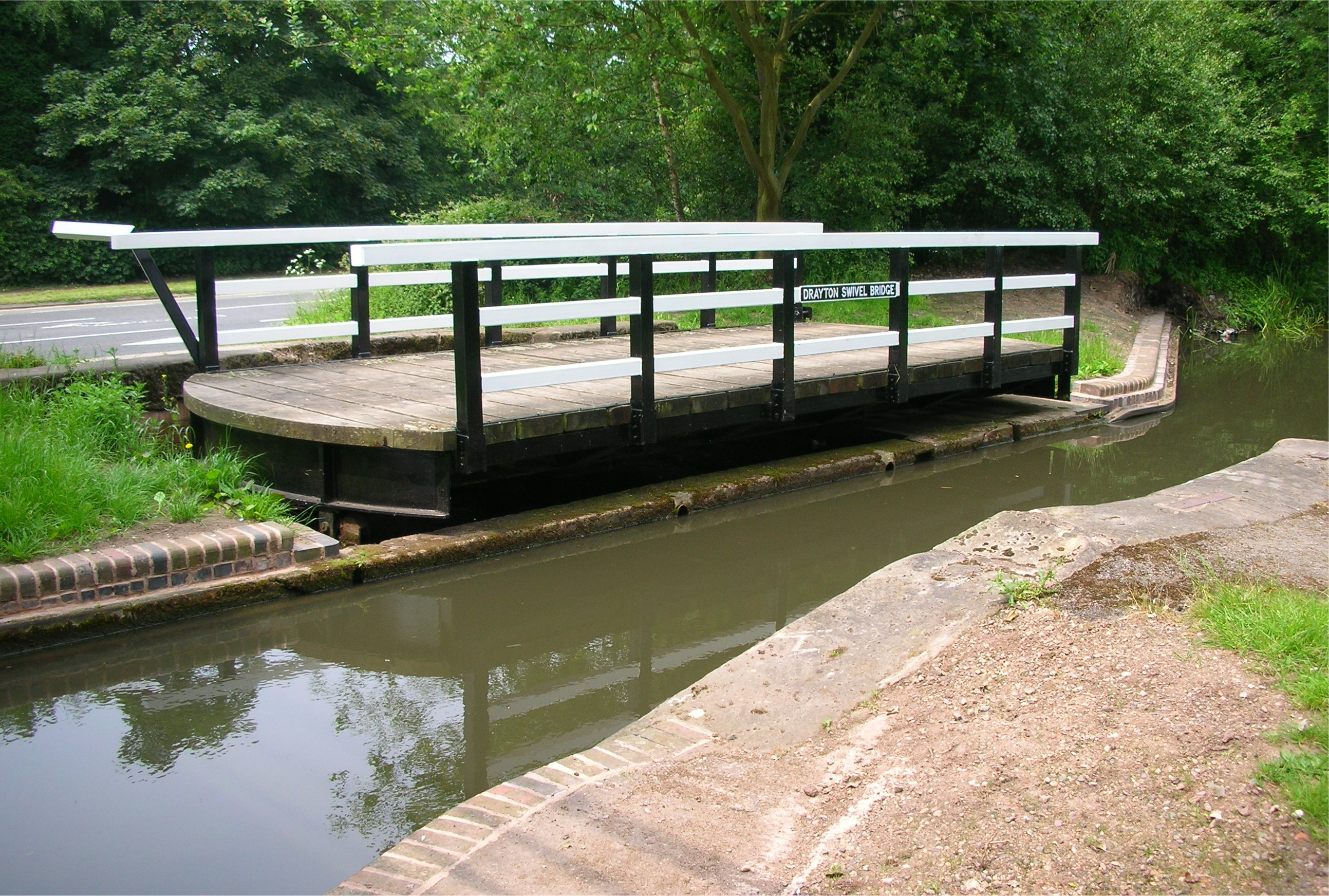
The Drayton swing bridge

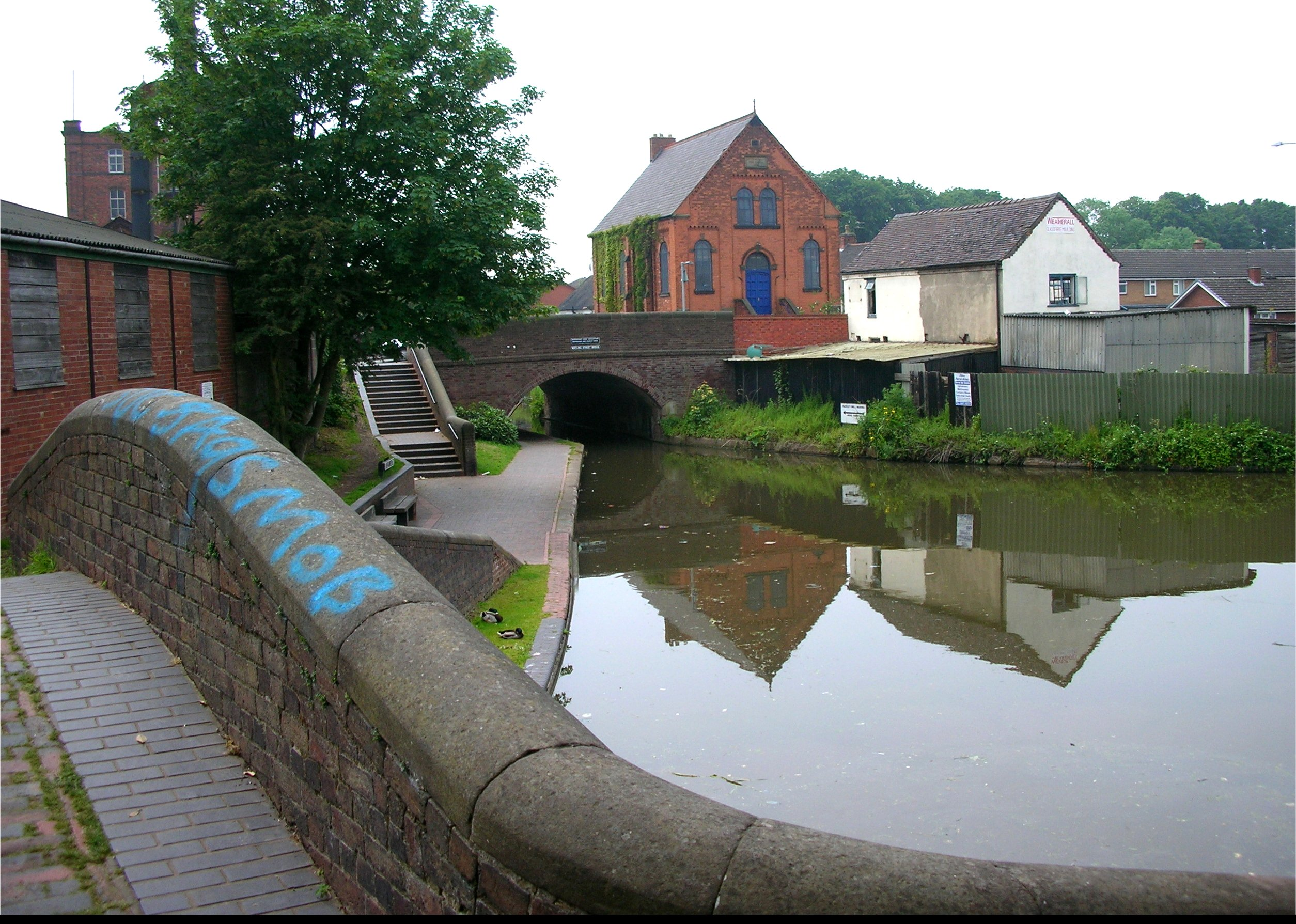
The termination of the authorised Birmingham and Fazeley Canal under the Watling Street Bridge at Fazeley

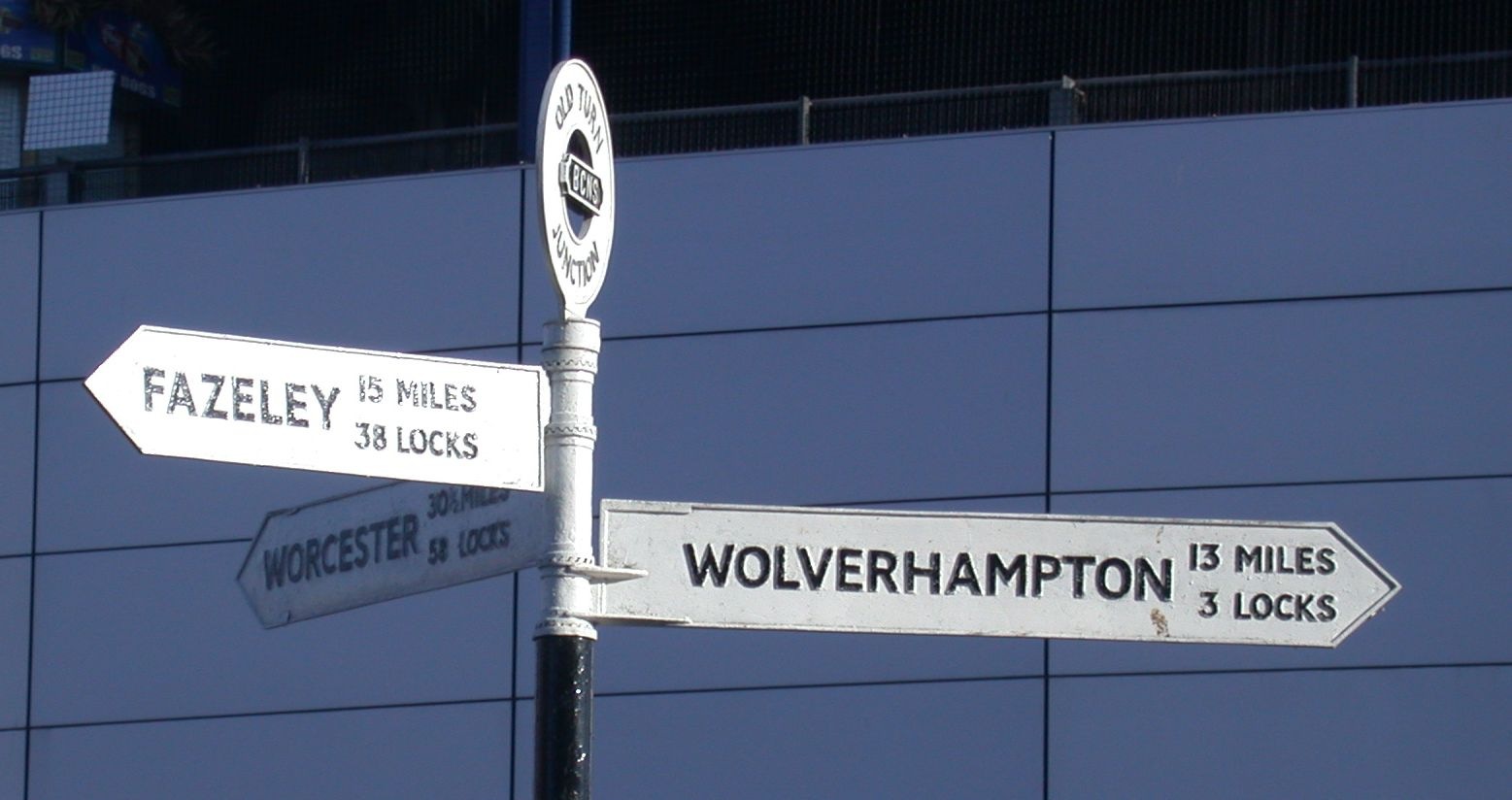
Fingerpost at Old Turn Junction, where the Birmingham and Fazeley Canal meets BCN Main Line

== Listed buildings and structures ==
Name	Photograph	Date	English Heritage reference	Grade
Deepcutting Roving Bridge		1827	1343082	Grade II
79, Cambridge Street. Canalside works and warehouse		ca. 1820	1343365	Grade II
1-4 Kingston Row, housing associated with the opening of the Birmingham and Fazeley Canal		1730	1076276	Grade II
5-6 Kingston Row, housing associated with the opening of the Birmingham and Fazeley Canal			1343103	Grade II
Lock Keepers Toll Office at Head of Farmers Bridge Locks		1789-1800	1076277	Grade II
Roving bridge by Farmers Bridge Lock 1		ca. 1828	1343104	Grade II
Two Cranes at East and West ends of basin at head of Farmers Bridge Locks			1076278	Grade II
Barker Bridge		1842	1219463	Grade II
Roving Bridge, Aston Junction		1828	1343098	Grade II
Roving Bridge, Aston Lock No 1		1780s	1219515	Grade II
Aston Lock No 7 with footbridge		Lock 1770s Footbridge ca. 1840	1276277	Grade II
Aqueduct over the River Tame		1780s	1291469	Grade II
Roving Bridge 110 at entrance to Birmingham and Warwick Junction Canal		1844	1076132	Grade II
Berwood Bridge		1810/1820	1220072	Grade II
Curdworth Tunnel		1794	1259858	Grade II
Dog and Doublet Inn		ca. 1800	1319892	Grade II
Curdworth Lock No 9		1794	1034724	Grade II
Cheatles Farm Bridge		1794	1116533	Grade II
Bodymoor Heath Bridge		1794	1389519	Grade II
Kingsbury Swivel Bridge (also known as Curdworth Swivel Bridge)		1794	1034719	Grade II
Curdworth Bottom Lock		1794	1299297	Grade II
Drayton Brick Bridge		1787	1294893	Grade II
Drayton Footbridge		1789	1038818	Grade II
Drayton Swivel Bridge		1787	1038819	Grade II

== See also ==
- Canals of the United Kingdom
- Transport in Birmingham
- History of the British canal system
- Waterscape

== Bibliography ==
- Hadfield, Charles (1985). The Canals of the West Midlands. David and Charles. ISBN 978-0-7153-8644-6.
- Nicholson (2006). Nicholson Guides Vol 3 – Birmingham & the Heart of England. Harper Collins. ISBN 978-0-00-721111-1.
- Pearson, Michael (1989). Canal Companion – Birmingham Canal Navigations. J. M. Pearson & Associates. ISBN 978-0-907864-49-3.
- Rolt, L.T.C. (1985). Navigable Waterways. Penguin Books. ISBN 978-0-14-007622-6.
- Skempton, Sir Alec; et al. (2002). A Biographical Dictionary of Civil Engineers in Great Britain and Ireland: Vol 1: 1500 to 1830. Thomas Telford. ISBN 978-0-7277-2939-2.
