= Fazeley Junction =

Canal junction in Staffordshire, England

Coordinates: 52°36′55″N 1°42′04″W

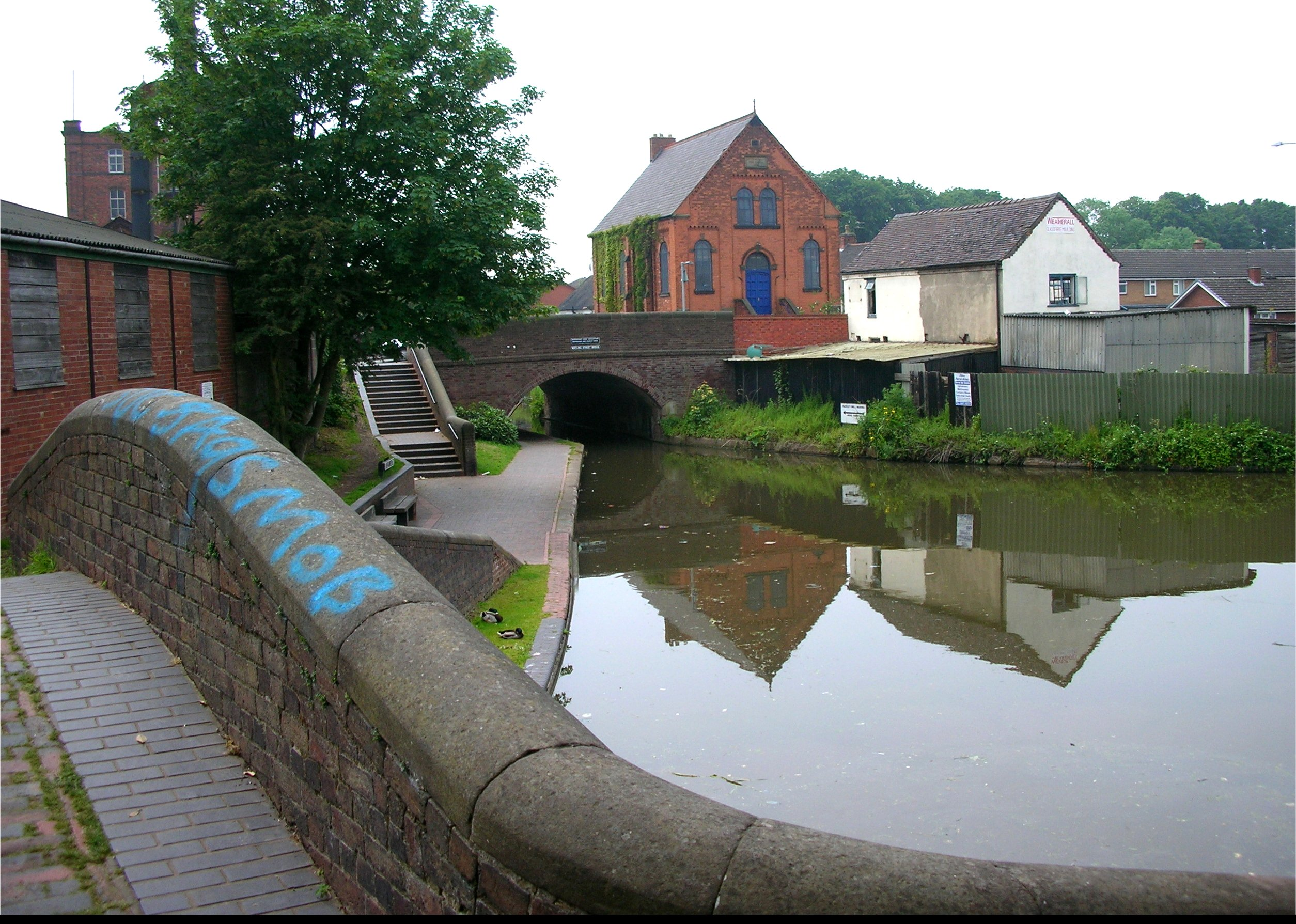
- The termination of the Birmingham and Fazeley Canal under the Watling Street Bridge at Fazeley on the right
- Interactive map of Fazeley Junction

Specifications
- Status: Open
- Navigation authority: Canal and River Trust

History
- Date completed: 1790

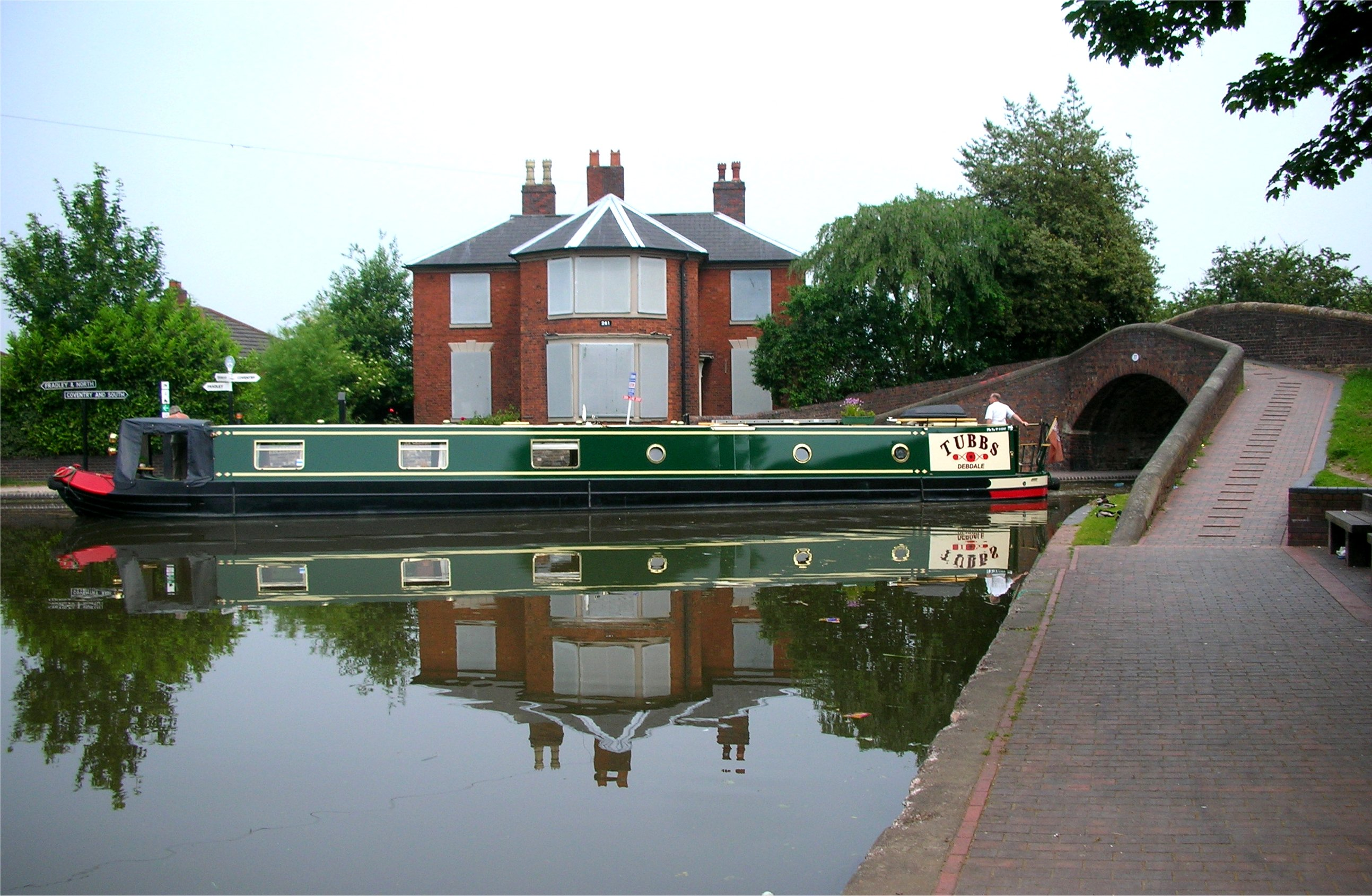
Fazeley Junction toll house and roving bridge over the Coventry Canal

Fazeley Junction (grid reference SK202020) is the name of the canal junction where the authorised Birmingham and Fazeley Canal terminates and meets the Coventry Canal at Fazeley, near Tamworth, Staffordshire, England.

== History ==
The Coventry Canal was authorised by an act of Parliament, the Coventry Canal Act 1768 (8 Geo. 3. c. 36), to connect Coventry to the Grand Trunk Canal, now called the Trent and Mersey Canal, at Fradley, passing through Atherstone and Fazeley. They opened the first 10 miles (16 km) from Coventry to Bedworth, where there were coal mines, in 1769, and a lucrative trade in coal soon developed. By the time they reached Atherstone in 1771, the money had run out and construction stopped. Atherstone was 10.4 miles (16.7 km) away from Fazeley.

The Birmingham and Fazeley Canal faced serious opposition from the Birmingham Canal Company, but this was eventually overcome, and the route was authorised in 1784. It was designed to provide a much shorter route to London, as all goods from Birmingham to London had previously had to pass down the River Severn before crossing southern England. However, the canal would have been useless unless the Coventry Canal link north of Atherstone was completed, and so the company negotiated with several other canals to ensure that it would be part of a much bigger network once it was completed. This included the Oxford Canal, who agreed to extend their line southwards to reach Oxford and the River Thames, while completion of the Coventry Canal link to Fradley was to be completed in three stages. The Coventry Canal Company would build the route to Fazeley, which included the eleven Atherstone locks and two more at Glascote. The Birmingham and Fazeley Canal would build the next section, from Fazeley to Whittington Brook, near Lichfield, some 5.5 miles (8.9 km) to the north, and the Trent and Mersey Canal would complete the route by building southwards from Fradley Junction to meet up at Whittington Brook. This section was also 5.5 miles (8.9 km) long.

The Birmingham and Fazeley Canal was completed in 1789, under the direction of John Smeaton and the whole network was operational in the following year. As a result of the junction and the traffic that passed through it, the Coventry Canal was profitable, and bought the section from Fradley to Whittington from the Trent and Mersey company, but the Birmingham and Fazeley, which soon became part of the Birmingham Canal Navigations, retained ownership of their section. As a result, the bridges north of Fazeley carry name plates in the BCN style, rather than numbers.

== Location ==
From the junction, the Birmingham and Fazeley Canal heads south, and is level for 3 miles (4.8 km) to Curdworth Bottom Lock, the first of 38 that ascend to Farmers Bridge Junction in Birmingham. The route to Fradley Junction heads north-west, and is level for the entire 11 miles (18 km), but there are locks on the Trent and Mersey Canal either side of the junction. The Coventry Canal initially heads north-east before turning to the south. The first lock is at Glascote, just 1.4 miles (2.3 km) from the junction.

== See also ==
- Canals of the United Kingdom
- History of the British canal system

== Bibliography ==
- Cumberlidge, Jane (2009). Inland Waterways of Great Britain (8th Ed.). Imray Laurie Norie and Wilson. ISBN 978-1-84623-010-3.
- Nicholson (2003). Nicholson Guide Vol 3: Birmingham and the Heart of England. Harper Collins. ISBN 0-00-713666-8.
- Pearson, Michael (1989). Canal Companion: Birmingham Canal Navigations. J. M. Pearson & Associates. ISBN 0-907864-49-X.
