= Longford, Coventry =

Ward of Coventry, England

Coordinates: 52.452°N 1.486°W

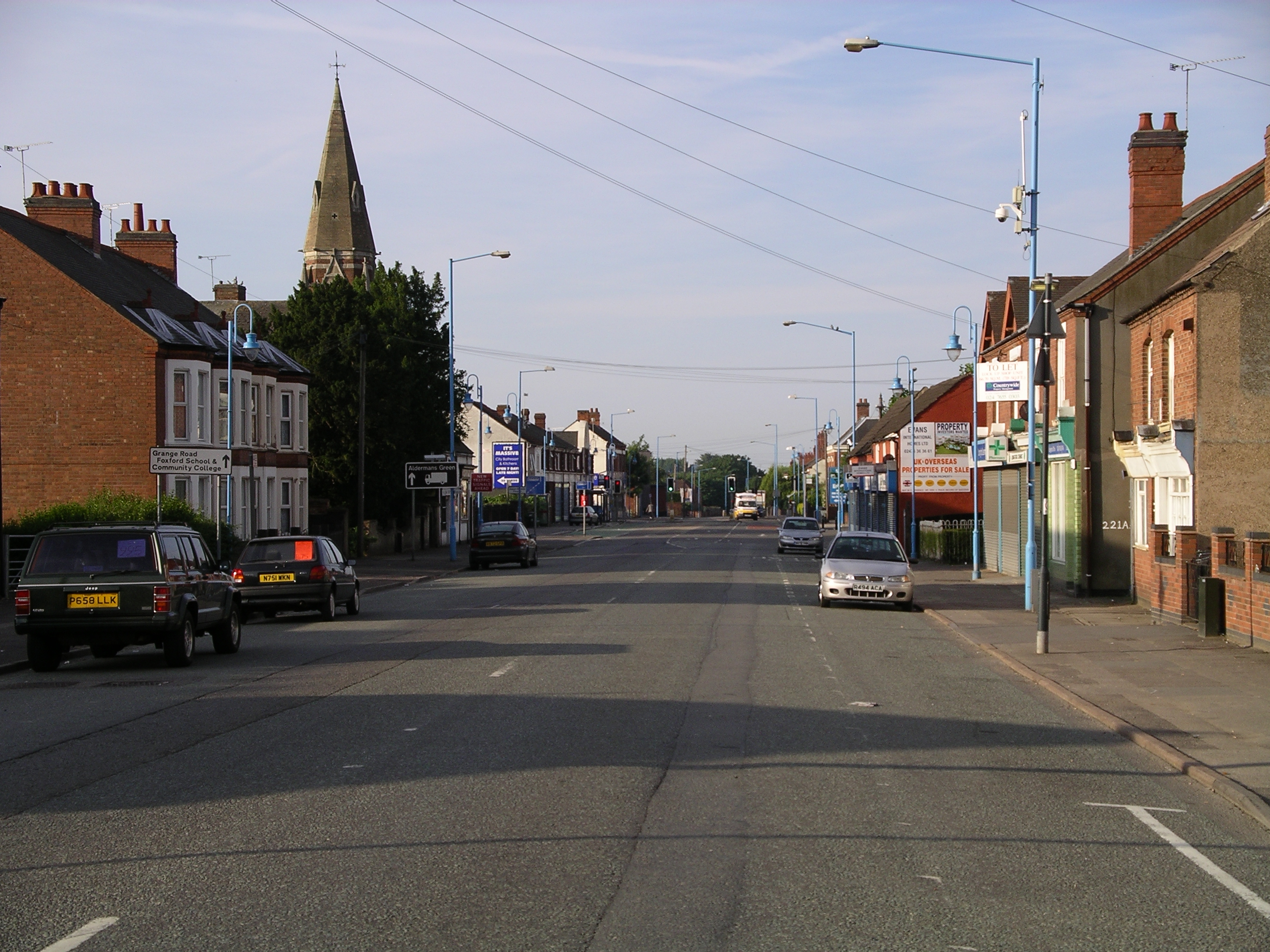
Longford Road, Bedworth (looking south)

Longford is a ward in the north of Coventry, West Midlands, England. The population of the Ward as taken at the 2011 census was 18,538. It is covered by the Coventry North East constituency and bounded by the wards of Holbrooks, Henley, Upper Stoke and Foleshill.

== Features ==
The neighbourhoods covered by the ward include Longford Village, Foxford, Rowleys Green, Alderman's Green, Hawkesbury, Bell Green, Manor House, Hall Green, Courthouse Green, Woodshires and Little Heath.

Longford is mainly residential, but it also has industrial areas and a few green areas, such as Longford Park and Longford Community Nature Park, which are in close proximity on opposite sides of Longford Road. In the north of the ward is the Coventry Building Society Arena, home to Wasps and Coventry City. Also part of the complex is Arena Park a Retail Centre including a Tesco Extra. Riley Square shopping centre is another shopping centre in the ward. Longford is also served by one library: Bell Green Library.

== Demographics ==
The 2001 UK Census found that there were 17,601 people living in Longford, with a population density of 37.3 per square kilometre; 738 people were students. 2011 Census data showed the population of Longford had increased to 18,538 people. Longford has an area of 472 square kilometres. The number of people who were unemployed in Longford was 522 according to the Office for National Statistics in June 2006. 12,409 people were of a working age. The largest employer in the ward in 2004 was Henley College. Henley College was formerly known as the Henley Campus of Coventry College.

== Education ==
Foxford Community School is the area's secondary school. Primary education is provided by Grangehurst Primary School.

== History ==
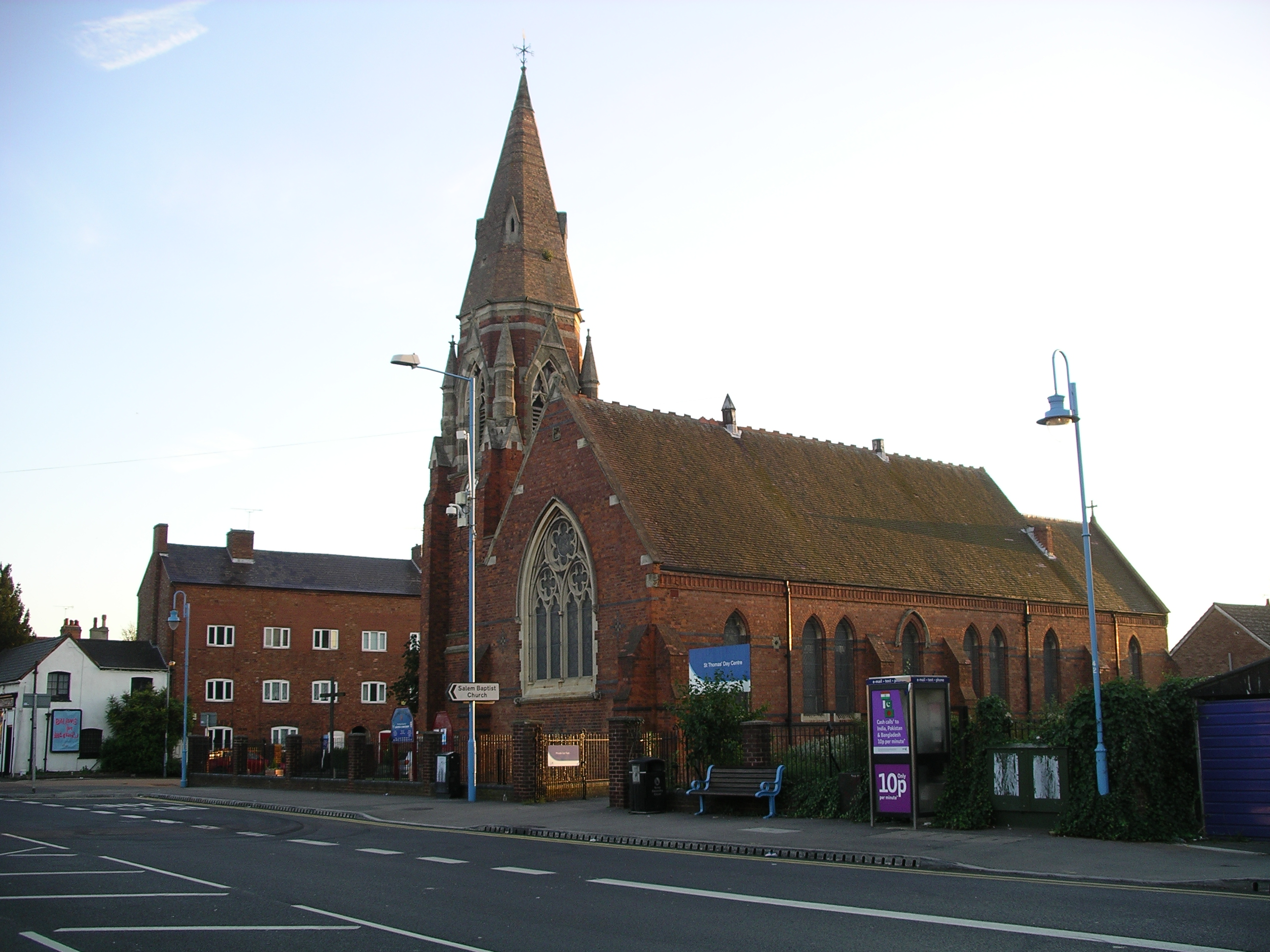
The church of St Thomas the Apostle, Longford Road, Coventry

The area is referred to as early as the 15th century, stating that there were houses and cottages in the areas of Longford and Foxford however these had not developed to form hamlets. A census in 1730 stated that there were only 20 houses in Longford and Foxford. Longford began to develop in the mid-18th century when the ribbon weaving industry and a flourishing coal mine at Hawkesbury encouraged workers and their families to move into Longford.

Historically Longford was part of Bedworth, under the parish of Exhall. During this period Thomas Mann, an English trade unionist and the First World War pacifist was born here. Longford was and still is on the main route from the mining districts of Nuneaton and Bedworth to Coventry. Longford at present is a suburb of Coventry.

== Canals ==
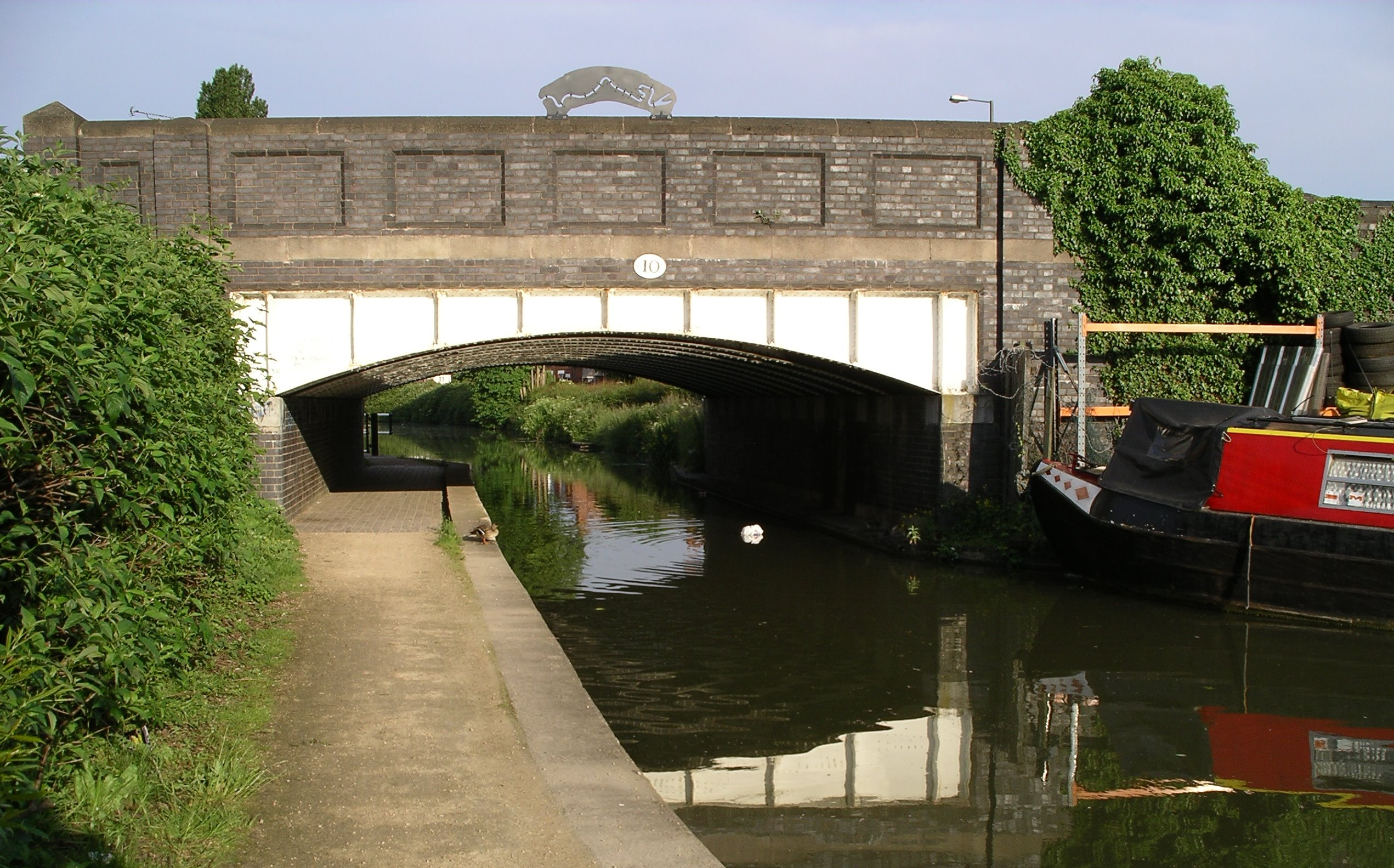
Coventry canal, the towpath, and one of bridges on Longford Road in Longford.

The Coventry Canal passes through the area. On the towpath is a sculpture named 'The Stone Sofa', by Tim Shutter. Unveiled on 31 May 1997, it was commissioned by Groundwork Coventry as part of the Coventry Canal Art Trail, and is owned by the City Development Directorate at Coventry City Council. The sculpture is 1.4 metres high, 2.4 metres wide and approximately one metre deep and carved out of solid sandstone.

The Oxford Canal was started in the area in 1769 and the first 10 miles were completed by 1771. The two canals passed alongside each other from Hawkesbury to Longford as the Coventry Canal Company and the Oxford Canal Company were unable to agree on tolls. Following a court injunction taken out by the Coventry Canal Company, the two canals were joined at Longford in 1777. The current junction of the canals is Hawkesbury Junction.

== Gallery ==
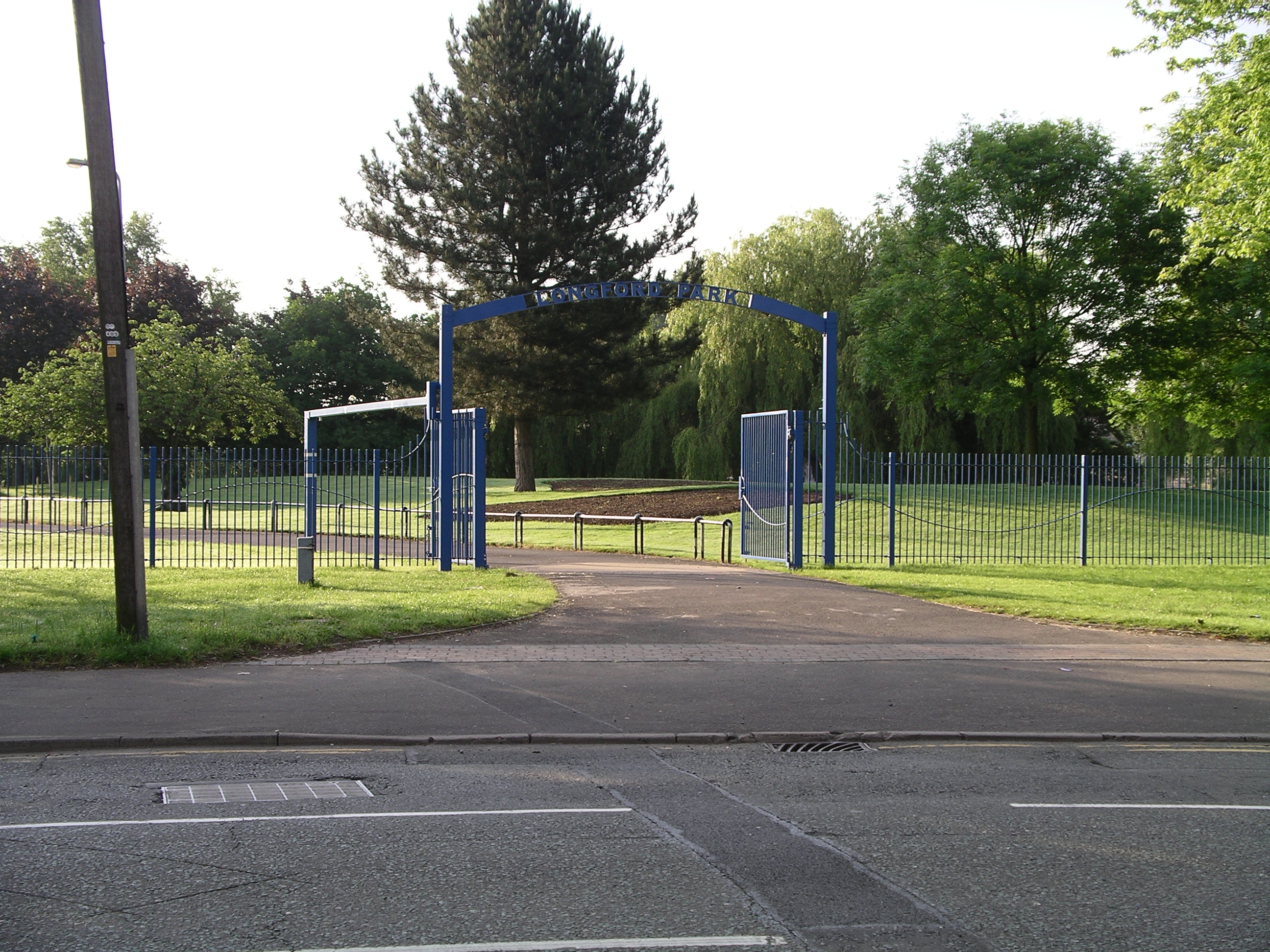
Longford Park

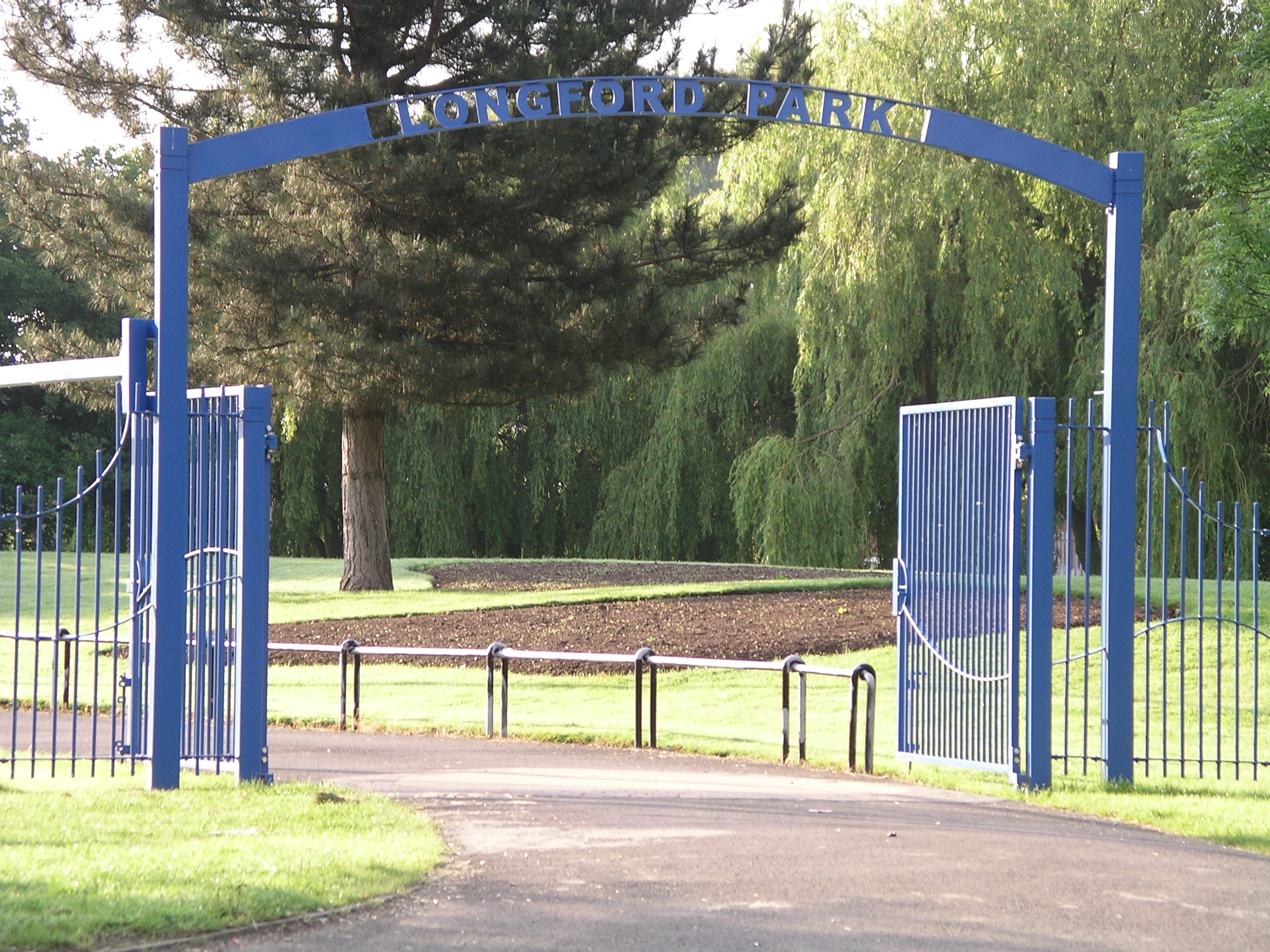
Longford Park gates

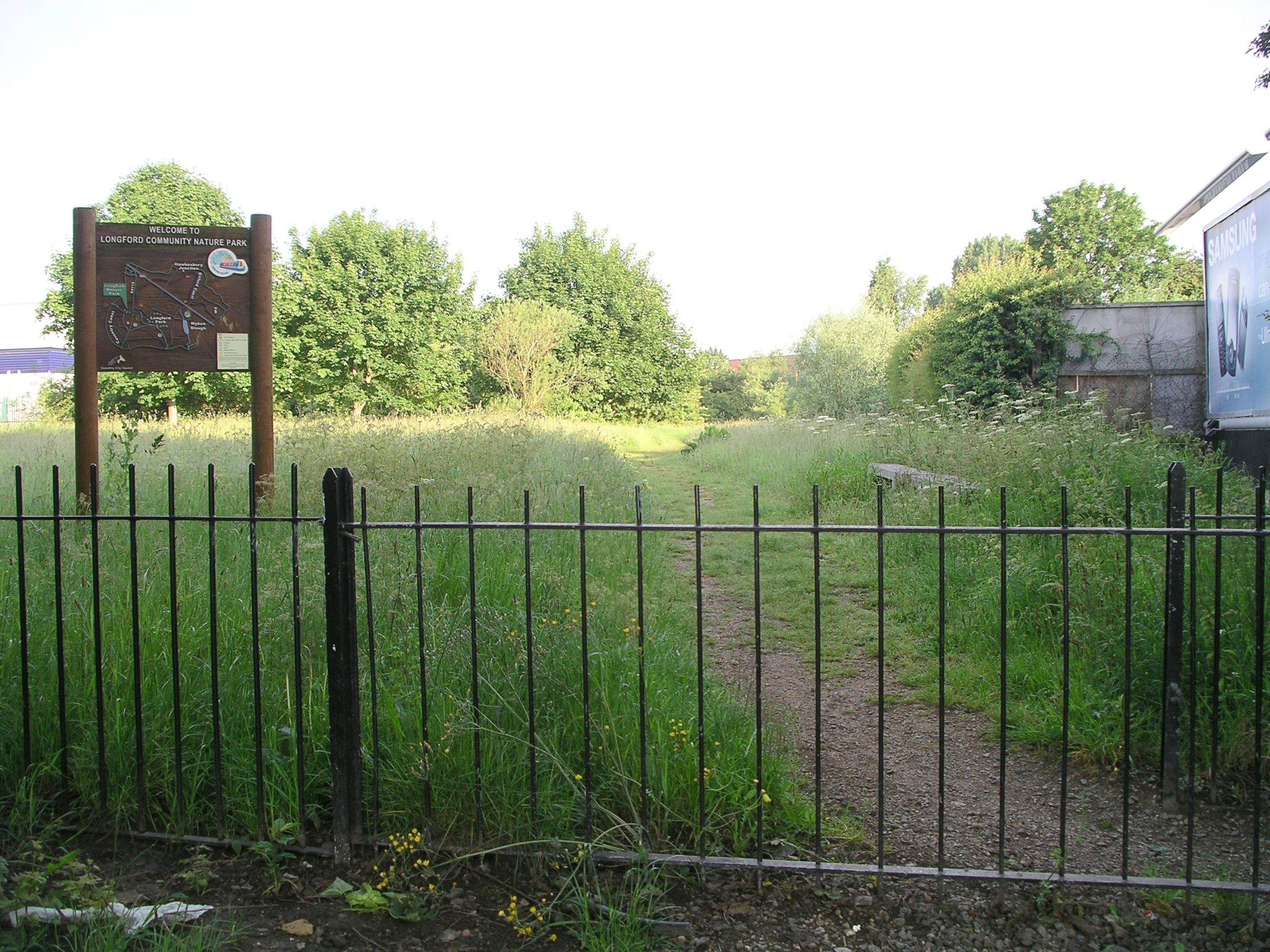
Longford Community Nature Park

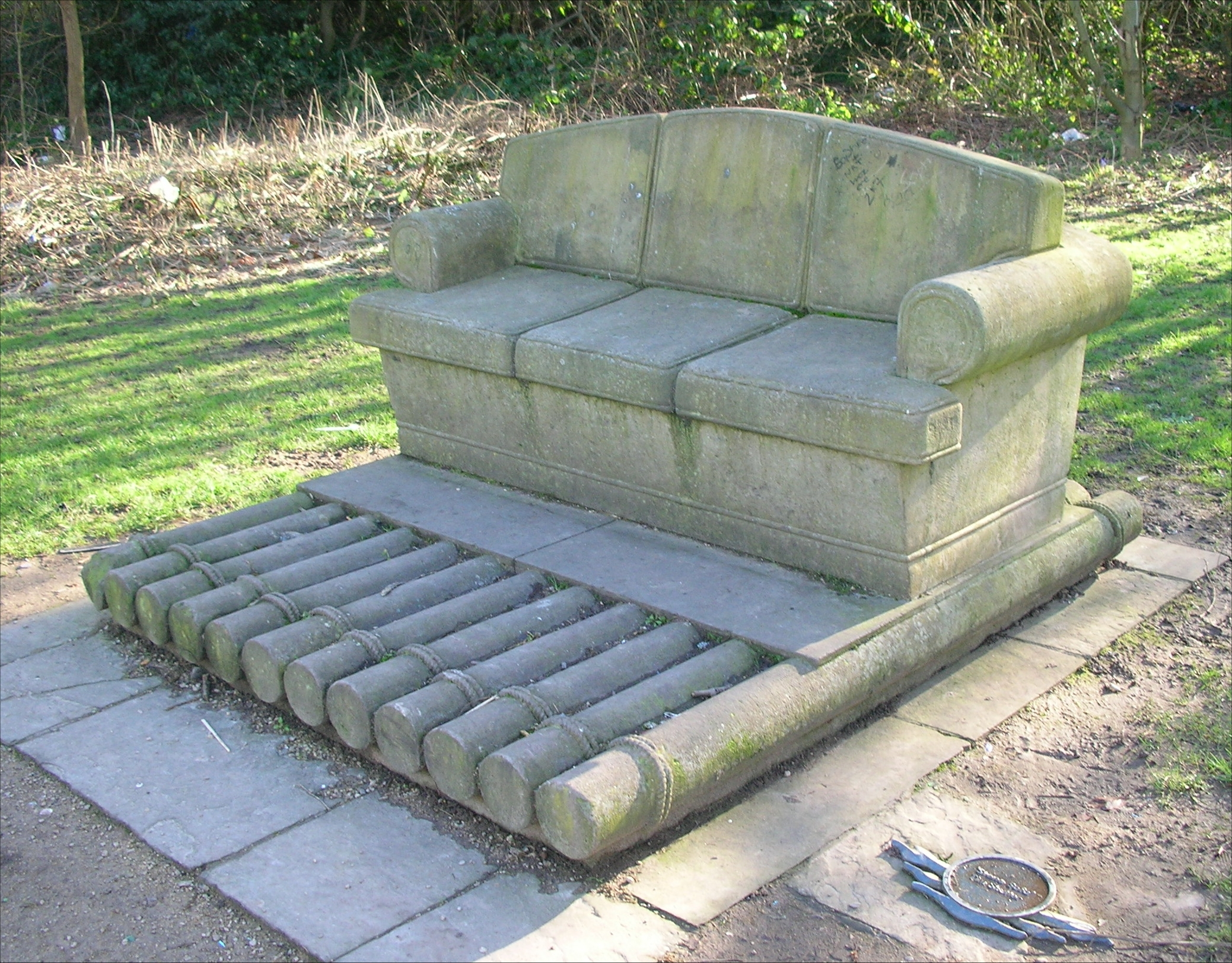
Sandstone sculpture Stone Sofa by Tim Shutter, on the Coventry Canal
