= List of United Kingdom locations: Fr-Fz =

The United Kingdom

This is part of the list of United Kingdom locations: a gazetteer of place names in the United Kingdom showing each place's locality and geographical coordinates.

== Fr ==
=== Fra ===
| Location | Locality | Coordinates (links to map & photo sources) | OS grid reference |
|---|---|---|---|
| Fraddam | Cornwall | 50.15°N 05.37°W | SW5934 |
| Fraddon | Cornwall | 50.38°N 04.94°W | SW9158 |
| Fradley | Staffordshire | 52.71°N 01.76°W | SK1613 |
| Fradley Junction | Staffordshire | 52.72°N 01.80°W | SK1314 |
| Fradswell | Staffordshire | 52.87°N 02.01°W | SJ9931 |
| Fraisthorpe | East Riding of Yorkshire | 54.03°N 00.24°W | TA1561 |
| Framfield | East Sussex | 50.96°N 00.12°E | TQ4920 |
| Framingham Earl | Norfolk | 52.56°N 01.34°E | TG2702 |
| Framingham Pigot | Norfolk | 52.57°N 01.34°E | TG2703 |
| Framlingham | Suffolk | 52.21°N 01.33°E | TM2863 |
| Frampton | Dorset | 50.75°N 02.54°W | SY6295 |
| Frampton | Lincolnshire | 52.93°N 00.03°W | TF3239 |
| Frampton Cotterell | South Gloucestershire | 51.52°N 02.49°W | ST6681 |
| Frampton Court | Gloucestershire | 51.98°N 01.98°W | SP0132 |
| Frampton End | South Gloucestershire | 51.52°N 02.47°W | ST6781 |
| Frampton Mansell | Gloucestershire | 51.71°N 02.11°W | SO9202 |
| Frampton on Severn | Gloucestershire | 51.76°N 02.37°W | SO7407 |
| Frampton West End | Lincolnshire | 52.95°N 00.06°W | TF3041 |
| Framsden | Suffolk | 52.18°N 01.21°E | TM2059 |
| Framwellgate Moor | Durham | 54.79°N 01.59°W | NZ2644 |
| France Lynch | Gloucestershire | 51.72°N 02.14°W | SO9003 |
| Franche | Worcestershire | 52.40°N 02.26°W | SO8278 |
| Frandley | Cheshire | 53.30°N 02.55°W | SJ6379 |
| Frankby | Wirral | 53.36°N 03.14°W | SJ2486 |
| Frankfort | Norfolk | 52.76°N 01.40°E | TG3024 |
| Franklands Gate | Herefordshire | 52.11°N 02.68°W | SO5346 |
| Frankley | Worcestershire | 52.41°N 02.01°W | SO9980 |
| Frankley Green | Worcestershire | 52.41°N 02.01°W | SO9980 |
| Frankley Hill | Worcestershire | 52.40°N 02.03°W | SO9879 |
| Frank Lockwood's Island | Argyll and Bute | 56.30°N 05.83°W | NM628192 |
| Frank's Bridge | Powys | 52.18°N 03.30°W | SO1155 |
| Frankton | Warwickshire | 52.32°N 01.38°W | SP4270 |
| Frankwell | Shropshire | 52.71°N 02.77°W | SJ4813 |
| Frans Green | Norfolk | 52.68°N 01.10°E | TG1014 |
| Frant | East Sussex | 51.09°N 00.26°E | TQ5935 |
| Fraserburgh | Aberdeenshire | 57.69°N 02.01°W | NJ9967 |
| Frating | Essex | 51.85°N 01.01°E | TM0822 |
| Frating Green | Essex | 51.86°N 01.03°E | TM0923 |
| Fratton | City of Portsmouth | 50.79°N 01.07°W | SU6500 |

=== Fre ===
| Location | Locality | Coordinates (links to map & photo sources) | OS grid reference |
|---|---|---|---|
| Freasley | Warwickshire | 52.58°N 01.64°W | SP2499 |
| Freathy | Cornwall | 50.34°N 04.26°W | SX3952 |
| Frecheville | Sheffield | 53.34°N 01.41°W | SK3983 |
| Freckenham | Suffolk | 52.32°N 00.43°E | TL6672 |
| Freckleton | Lancashire | 53.74°N 02.88°W | SD4228 |
| Fredley | Surrey | 51.25°N 00.33°W | TQ1652 |
| Freebirch | Derbyshire | 53.24°N 01.55°W | SK3072 |
| Freeby | Leicestershire | 52.77°N 00.81°W | SK8020 |
| Freefolk | Hampshire | 51.22°N 01.31°W | SU4848 |
| Freehay | Staffordshire | 52.96°N 01.97°W | SK0241 |
| Freeland | Oxfordshire | 51.80°N 01.40°W | SP4112 |
| Freeland | Renfrewshire | 55.89°N 04.46°W | NS4669 |
| Freeland Corner | Norfolk | 52.69°N 01.19°E | TG1616 |
| Freelands | Northumberland | 55.40°N 01.70°W | NU1912 |
| Freemantle | City of Southampton | 50.90°N 01.43°W | SU4012 |
| Freester | Shetland Islands | 60.25°N 01.18°W | HU4553 |
| Freethorpe | Norfolk | 52.58°N 01.55°E | TG4105 |
| Free Town | Bury | 53.59°N 02.28°W | SD8111 |
| Freezy Water | Enfield | 51.67°N 00.03°W | TQ3699 |
| Freiston | Lincolnshire | 52.97°N 00.03°E | TF3744 |
| Freiston Shore | Lincolnshire | 52.95°N 00.06°E | TF3942 |
| Fremington | Devon | 51.06°N 04.12°W | SS5132 |
| Fremington | North Yorkshire | 54.38°N 01.93°W | SE0499 |
| Frenchay | City of Bristol | 51.49°N 02.51°W | ST6477 |
| Frenchbeer | Devon | 50.64°N 03.88°W | SX6785 |
| Frenches Green | Essex | 51.85°N 00.46°E | TL7020 |
| Frenchmoor | Hampshire | 51.05°N 01.63°W | SU2628 |
| French Street | Kent | 51.24°N 00.07°E | TQ4552 |
| Frenchwood | Lancashire | 53.74°N 02.69°W | SD5428 |
| Frensham | Surrey | 51.16°N 00.79°W | SU8441 |
| Frenze | Norfolk | 52.37°N 01.12°E | TM1380 |
| Freshbrook | Swindon | 51.54°N 01.84°W | SU1183 |
| Freshfield | Sefton | 53.56°N 03.07°W | SD2908 |
| Freshford | Bath and North East Somerset | 51.33°N 02.31°W | ST7860 |
| Freshwater | Isle of Wight | 50.67°N 01.52°W | SZ3486 |
| Freshwater Bay | Isle of Wight | 50.66°N 01.52°W | SZ3485 |
| Freshwater East | Pembrokeshire | 51.64°N 04.87°W | SS0198 |
| Fressingfield | Suffolk | 52.34°N 01.31°E | TM2677 |
| Freston | Suffolk | 52.00°N 01.14°E | TM1639 |
| Freswick | Highland | 58.58°N 03.10°W | ND3667 |
| Fretherne | Gloucestershire | 51.77°N 02.39°W | SO7309 |
| Frettenham | Norfolk | 52.70°N 01.31°E | TG2417 |
| Freuchie | Fife | 56.24°N 03.16°W | NO2806 |
| Freuchies | Angus | 56.72°N 03.27°W | NO2260 |
| Freystrop | Pembrokeshire | 51.76°N 04.97°W | SM9511 |

=== Fri ===
| Location | Locality | Coordinates (links to map & photo sources) | OS grid reference |
|---|---|---|---|
| Friarn | Somerset | 51.13°N 03.18°W | ST1738 |
| Friar Park | Sandwell | 52.54°N 02.00°W | SP0094 |
| Friars Cliff | Dorset | 50.72°N 01.73°W | SZ1992 |
| Friar's Gate | East Sussex | 51.07°N 00.12°E | TQ4933 |
| Friar's Hill | East Sussex | 50.88°N 00.62°E | TQ8513 |
| Friarton | Perth and Kinross | 56.37°N 03.44°W | NO1121 |
| Friday Bridge | Cambridgeshire | 52.61°N 00.15°E | TF4604 |
| Friday Hill | Waltham Forest | 51.61°N 00.01°E | TQ3993 |
| Friday Street (Rendlesham) | Suffolk | 52.10°N 01.40°E | TM3351 |
| Friday Street (Farnham) | Suffolk | 52.18°N 01.46°E | TM3760 |
| Friday Street | Surrey | 51.19°N 00.39°W | TQ1245 |
| Fridaythorpe | East Riding of Yorkshire | 54.02°N 00.67°W | SE8759 |
| Friendly | Calderdale | 53.71°N 01.92°W | SE0524 |
| Friern Barnet | Barnet | 51.61°N 00.15°W | TQ2892 |
| Friesthorpe | Lincolnshire | 53.33°N 00.39°W | TF0783 |
| Frieston | Lincolnshire | 53.01°N 00.61°W | SK9347 |
| Frieth | Buckinghamshire | 51.60°N 00.86°W | SU7990 |
| Frieze Hill | Somerset | 51.01°N 03.12°W | ST2125 |
| Friezeland | Nottinghamshire | 53.04°N 01.30°W | SK4750 |
| Frilford | Oxfordshire | 51.67°N 01.37°W | SU4397 |
| Frilford Heath | Oxfordshire | 51.67°N 01.36°W | SU4498 |
| Frilsham | Berkshire | 51.45°N 01.22°W | SU5473 |
| Frimley | Surrey | 51.31°N 00.73°W | SU8858 |
| Frimley Green | Surrey | 51.29°N 00.73°W | SU8856 |
| Frimley Ridge | Surrey | 51.32°N 00.72°W | SU8959 |
| Frindsbury | Kent | 51.39°N 00.49°E | TQ7469 |
| Fring | Norfolk | 52.87°N 00.56°E | TF7334 |
| Fringford | Oxfordshire | 51.94°N 01.12°W | SP6028 |
| Friningham | Kent | 51.29°N 00.59°E | TQ8158 |
| Frinkle Green | Essex | 52.03°N 00.47°E | TL7040 |
| Frinsted | Kent | 51.28°N 00.70°E | TQ8957 |
| Frinton-On-Sea | Essex | 51.82°N 01.23°E | TM2319 |
| Friockheim | Angus | 56.63°N 02.66°W | NO5949 |
| Friog | Gwynedd | 52.68°N 04.05°W | SH6112 |
| Frisby | Leicestershire | 52.60°N 00.96°W | SK7001 |
| Frisby on the Wreake | Leicestershire | 52.74°N 00.97°W | SK6917 |
| Friskney | Lincolnshire | 53.07°N 00.17°E | TF4655 |
| Friskney Eaudyke | Lincolnshire | 53.07°N 00.19°E | TF4755 |
| Friston | East Sussex | 50.76°N 00.19°E | TV5598 |
| Friston | Suffolk | 52.18°N 01.52°E | TM4160 |
| Fritchley | Derbyshire | 53.07°N 01.47°W | SK3553 |
| Frith | Kent | 51.26°N 00.77°E | TQ9455 |
| Fritham | Hampshire | 50.92°N 01.67°W | SU2314 |
| Frith Bank | Lincolnshire | 53.00°N 00.04°W | TF3147 |
| Frith Common | Worcestershire | 52.31°N 02.45°W | SO6969 |
| Frithelstock | Devon | 50.94°N 04.19°W | SS4619 |
| Frithelstock Stone | Devon | 50.94°N 04.20°W | SS4518 |
| Frithend | Hampshire | 51.14°N 00.85°W | SU8039 |
| Frith Hill | Surrey | 51.18°N 00.61°W | SU9744 |
| Frith-hill | Buckinghamshire | 51.70°N 00.69°W | SP9001 |
| Frithsden | Hertfordshire | 51.77°N 00.53°W | TL0109 |
| Frithville | Lincolnshire | 53.03°N 00.04°W | TF3150 |
| Frittenden | Kent | 51.13°N 00.58°E | TQ8141 |
| Frittiscombe | Devon | 50.27°N 03.68°W | SX8043 |
| Fritton (South Norfolk) | Norfolk | 52.48°N 01.26°E | TM2292 |
| Fritton (Great Yarmouth) | Norfolk | 52.54°N 01.62°E | TG4600 |
| Fritton (North Norfolk) | Norfolk | 52.70°N 01.55°E | TG4018 |
| Fritwell | Oxfordshire | 51.95°N 01.24°W | SP5229 |
| Frizinghall | Bradford | 53.81°N 01.78°W | SE1435 |
| Frizington | Cumbria | 54.53°N 03.50°W | NY0317 |
| Frizzeler's Green | Suffolk | 52.22°N 00.60°E | TL7862 |

=== Fro ===
| Location | Locality | Coordinates (links to map & photo sources) | OS grid reference |
|---|---|---|---|
| Frobost | Western Isles | 57.19°N 07.41°W | NF7325 |
| Frocester | Gloucestershire | 51.72°N 02.31°W | SO7803 |
| Frochas | Powys | 52.68°N 03.05°W | SJ2910 |
| Frodesley | Shropshire | 52.60°N 02.72°W | SJ5101 |
| Frodingham | North Lincolnshire | 53.58°N 00.65°W | SE8911 |
| Frodsham | Cheshire | 53.28°N 02.72°W | SJ5277 |
| Frog End (Haslingfield) | Cambridgeshire | 52.14°N 00.04°E | TL4052 |
| Frog End (Little Wilbraham) | Cambridgeshire | 52.19°N 00.23°E | TL5358 |
| Froggatt | Derbyshire | 53.28°N 01.64°W | SK2476 |
| Froghall | Staffordshire | 53.02°N 01.97°W | SK0247 |
| Frogham | Kent | 51.20°N 01.21°E | TR2550 |
| Frogham | Hampshire | 50.91°N 01.77°W | SU1613 |
| Froghole | Kent | 51.24°N 00.06°E | TQ4451 |
| Frogholt | Kent | 51.09°N 01.09°E | TR1737 |
| Frogland Cross | South Gloucestershire | 51.54°N 02.52°W | ST6483 |
| Frog Moor | Swansea | 51.58°N 04.21°W | SS4790 |
| Frogmore | Cornwall | 50.26°N 03.72°W | SX7742 |
| Frogmore | Hertfordshire | 51.71°N 00.33°W | TL1503 |
| Frogmore (East Meon) | Hampshire | 50.99°N 01.03°W | SU6822 |
| Frogmore (Blackwater) | Hampshire | 51.33°N 00.79°W | SU8460 |
| Frognal | Camden | 51.55°N 00.18°W | TQ2685 |
| Frognal | Bexley | 51.417°N 00.104°E | TQ464708 |
| Frognal | South Ayrshire | 55.52°N 04.63°W | NS3429 |
| Frognall | Lincolnshire | 52.67°N 00.28°W | TF1610 |
| Frogpool | Cornwall | 50.21°N 05.14°W | SW7640 |
| Frog Pool | Worcestershire | 52.28°N 02.30°W | SO7965 |
| Frogs' Green | Essex | 52.00°N 00.30°E | TL5837 |
| Frogshall | Norfolk | 52.89°N 01.34°E | TG2538 |
| Frogwell | Cornwall | 50.48°N 04.34°W | SX3468 |
| Frolesworth | Leicestershire | 52.50°N 01.26°W | SP5090 |
| Frome | Somerset | 51.22°N 02.33°W | ST7747 |
| Fromebridge | Gloucestershire | 51.76°N 02.34°W | SO7607 |
| Fromefield | Somerset | 51.23°N 02.31°W | ST7848 |
| Fromes Hill | Herefordshire | 52.11°N 02.48°W | SO6746 |
| Frome St Quintin | Dorset | 50.81°N 02.58°W | ST5902 |
| Fromington | Herefordshire | 52.11°N 02.68°W | SO5347 |
| Fron | Denbighshire | 53.18°N 03.42°W | SJ0566 |
| Fron | Gwynedd | 53.06°N 04.22°W | SH5154 |
| Fron (Llanbadarn Fawr) | Powys | 52.27°N 03.33°W | SO0965 |
| Fron (Berriew) | Powys | 52.56°N 03.22°W | SO1797 |
| Fron (Llanbrynmair) | Powys | 52.58°N 03.59°W | SH9200 |
| Fron (Forden with Leighton and Trelystan) | Powys | 52.61°N 03.15°W | SJ2203 |
| Fron | Shropshire | 52.90°N 03.10°W | SJ2635 |
| Fron-Bache | Denbighshire | 52.96°N 03.17°W | SJ2141 |
| Froncysyllte | Wrexham | 52.96°N 03.08°W | SJ2741 |
| Fron-deg | Wrexham | 53.02°N 03.08°W | SJ2748 |
| Frongoch | Gwynedd | 52.93°N 03.63°W | SH9039 |
| Fron Isaf | Wrexham | 52.95°N 03.08°W | SJ2740 |
| Frost | Devon | 50.84°N 03.74°W | SS7706 |
| Frostenden | Suffolk | 52.37°N 01.64°E | TM4881 |
| Frostenden Corner | Suffolk | 52.36°N 01.64°E | TM4880 |
| Frosterley | Durham | 54.72°N 01.97°W | NZ0237 |
| Frost Hill | North Somerset | 51.37°N 02.82°W | ST4364 |
| Frostlane | Hampshire | 50.85°N 01.39°W | SU4306 |
| Frost Row | Norfolk | 52.57°N 00.95°E | TG0002 |
| Frotoft | Orkney Islands | 59.12°N 03.05°W | HY4027 |
| Froxfield | Bedfordshire | 51.98°N 00.58°W | SP9733 |
| Froxfield | Wiltshire | 51.41°N 01.58°W | SU2968 |
| Froxfield Green | Hampshire | 51.02°N 01.00°W | SU7025 |

=== Fry ===
| Location | Locality | Coordinates (links to map & photo sources) | OS grid reference |
|---|---|---|---|
| Fryern Hill | Hampshire | 50.97°N 01.37°W | SU4420 |
| Fryerning | Essex | 51.67°N 00.37°E | TL6400 |
| Fryerns | Essex | 51.57°N 00.48°E | TQ7289 |
| Fryton | North Yorkshire | 54.16°N 00.95°W | SE6875 |

== Fu ==
| Location | Locality | Coordinates (links to map & photo sources) | OS grid reference |
|---|---|---|---|
| Fuiay | Western Isles | 56.99°N 07.36°W | NF742022 |
| Fuday | Western Isles | 57.05°N 07.38°W | NF736085 |
| Fugglestone St Peter | Wiltshire | 51.07°N 01.85°W | SU1031 |
| Fulbeck | Northumberland | 55.17°N 01.70°W | NZ1987 |
| Fulbeck | Lincolnshire | 53.03°N 00.59°W | SK9450 |
| Fulbourn | Cambridgeshire | 52.18°N 00.20°E | TL5156 |
| Fulbrook | Oxfordshire | 51.81°N 01.62°W | SP2613 |
| Fulflood | Hampshire | 51.05°N 01.33°W | SU4729 |
| Fulford | Somerset | 51.05°N 03.14°W | ST2029 |
| Fulford | Staffordshire | 52.93°N 02.07°W | SJ9537 |
| Fulford | York | 53.93°N 01.07°W | SE6149 |
| Fulham | Hammersmith and Fulham | 51.46°N 00.21°W | TQ2476 |
| Fulking | West Sussex | 50.88°N 00.23°W | TQ2411 |
| Fullabrook | Devon | 51.14°N 04.11°W | SS5241 |
| Fullarton | North Ayrshire | 55.60°N 04.66°W | NS3238 |
| Fullarton | City of Glasgow | 55.84°N 04.17°W | NS6463 |
| Fuller's End | Essex | 51.90°N 00.22°E | TL5325 |
| Fullers Moor | Cheshire | 53.08°N 02.76°W | SJ4954 |
| Fuller Street | Essex | 51.80°N 00.52°E | TL7415 |
| Fullerton | Hampshire | 51.14°N 01.47°W | SU3739 |
| Fulletby | Lincolnshire | 53.23°N 00.06°W | TF2973 |
| Fullshaw | Barnsley | 53.50°N 01.69°W | SE2001 |
| Full Sutton | East Riding of Yorkshire | 53.98°N 00.87°W | SE7455 |
| Fullwell Cross | Redbridge | 51.59°N 00.07°E | TQ4490 |
| Fullwood | Oldham | 53.56°N 02.09°W | SD9408 |
| Fullwood | East Ayrshire | 55.71°N 04.48°W | NS4450 |
| Fulmer | Buckinghamshire | 51.55°N 00.57°W | SU9985 |
| Fulmodeston | Norfolk | 52.83°N 00.95°E | TF9930 |
| Fulneck | Leeds | 53.78°N 01.66°W | SE2232 |
| Fulnetby | Lincolnshire | 53.29°N 00.36°W | TF0979 |
| Fulney | Lincolnshire | 52.79°N 00.14°W | TF2523 |
| Fulready | Warwickshire | 52.11°N 01.59°W | SP2846 |
| Fulshaw Park | Cheshire | 53.31°N 02.24°W | SJ8480 |
| Fulstone | Kirklees | 53.57°N 01.74°W | SE1709 |
| Fulstow | Lincolnshire | 53.45°N 00.01°W | TF3297 |
| Fulthorpe | Stockton-on-Tees | 54.61°N 01.36°W | NZ4124 |
| Fulwell | Richmond upon Thames | 51.43°N 0.34°W | TQ1497 |
| Fulwell | Oxfordshire | 51.90°N 01.46°W | SP3723 |
| Fulwell | Sunderland | 54.92°N 01.39°W | NZ3959 |
| Fulwood | Lancashire | 53.77°N 02.69°W | SD5431 |
| Fulwood | Sheffield | 53.36°N 01.55°W | SK3085 |
| Fulwood | Somerset | 50.97°N 03.12°W | ST2120 |
| Fundenhall Street | Norfolk | 52.52°N 01.13°E | TM1396 |
| Funtington | West Sussex | 50.86°N 00.86°W | SU8008 |
| Funtley | Hampshire | 50.86°N 01.20°W | SU5608 |
| Funzie | Shetland Islands | 60.58°N 00.79°W | HU6690 |
| Furleigh Cross | Dorset | 50.77°N 02.78°W | SY4598 |
| Furley | Devon | 50.83°N 03.03°W | ST2704 |
| Furnace | Ceredigion | 52.53°N 03.94°W | SN6895 |
| Furnace (Burry Port) | Carmarthenshire | 51.67°N 04.27°W | SN4300 |
| Furnace (Llanelli) | Carmarthenshire | 51.68°N 04.17°W | SN5001 |
| Furnace | Argyll and Bute | 56.15°N 05.18°W | NN0200 |
| Furnace End | Warwickshire | 52.51°N 01.64°W | SP2491 |
| Furnace Green | West Sussex | 51.10°N 00.17°W | TQ2835 |
| Furnace Wood | West Sussex | 51.13°N 00.07°W | TQ3539 |
| Furner's Green | East Sussex | 51.01°N 00.01°W | TQ4026 |
| Furness Vale | Derbyshire | 53.34°N 02.00°W | SK0083 |
| Furneux Pelham | Hertfordshire | 51.93°N 00.07°E | TL4328 |
| Furnham | Somerset | 50.87°N 02.96°W | ST3209 |
| Further Ford End | Essex | 51.96°N 00.10°E | TL4532 |
| Further Quarter | Kent | 51.11°N 00.69°E | TQ8939 |
| Furtho | Northamptonshire | 52.08°N 00.87°W | SP7743 |
| Furze | Devon | 51.01°N 03.94°W | SS6426 |
| Furzebrook | Dorset | 50.64°N 02.10°W | SY9383 |
| Furzedown | Hampshire | 51.05°N 01.48°W | SU3629 |
| Furzedown | Wandsworth | 51.41°N 00.16°W | TQ2870 |
| Furzehill | Dorset | 50.81°N 01.98°W | SU0102 |
| Furze Hill | Hampshire | 50.89°N 01.75°W | SU1711 |
| Furzeley Corner | Hampshire | 50.88°N 01.07°W | SU6510 |
| Furze Platt | Berkshire | 51.53°N 00.74°W | SU8782 |
| Furzey Island | Dorset | 50.68°N 01.98°W | SZ012871 |
| Furzey Lodge | Hampshire | 50.81°N 01.49°W | SU3602 |
| Furzley | Hampshire | 50.94°N 01.60°W | SU2816 |
| Furzton | Milton Keynes | 52.00°N 00.77°W | SP8435 |

== Fy ==
| Location | Locality | Coordinates (links to map & photo sources) | OS grid reference |
|---|---|---|---|
| Fyfett | Somerset | 50.92°N 03.09°W | ST2314 |
| Fyfield | Hampshire | 51.21°N 01.58°W | SU2946 |
| Fyfield | Essex | 51.73°N 00.25°E | TL5606 |
| Fyfield | Oxfordshire | 51.67°N 01.39°W | SU4298 |
| Fyfield | Gloucestershire | 51.72°N 01.71°W | SP2003 |
| Fyfield (near Marlborough) | Wiltshire | 51.41°N 01.80°W | SU1468 |
| Fyfield (near Pewsey) | Wiltshire | 51.33°N 01.75°W | SU1760 |
| Fylingthorpe | North Yorkshire | 54.42°N 00.55°W | NZ9404 |
| Fyning | West Sussex | 51.00°N 00.84°W | SU8124 |
| Fyvie | Aberdeenshire | 57.42°N 02.40°W | NJ7637 |
