= Fradley and Streethay =

Former civil parish in Staffordshire, England

Coordinates: 52.720°N 1.763°W

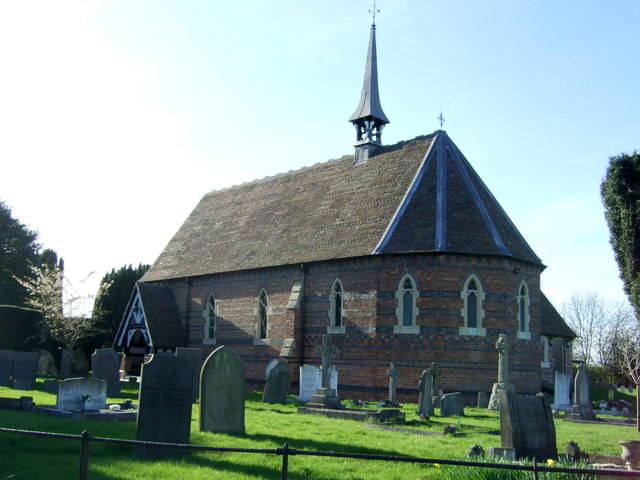
- Fradley

- Location within Staffordshire
- Area: 26.5346 km^{2} (10.2451 sq mi)
- Population: 3,753 (2011 census)
  - Density: 141/km^{2} (370/sq mi)
- Civil parish: Fradley; Streethay
- District: Lichfield
- Shire county: Staffordshire
- Region: West Midlands
- Country: England
- Sovereign state: United Kingdom
- Police: Staffordshire
- Fire: Staffordshire
- Ambulance: West Midlands

Fradley and Streethay was a civil parish in Lichfield District, Staffordshire, England, from 1 April 2009 to 1 April 2023. It included the villages of Fradley and Streethay.

The parish was formed on 1 April 2009 when the former parishes of Alrewas and Fradley and Streethay were abolished to form two new parishes: one was Fradley and Streethay, and the other Alrewas. The parish was abolished on 1 April 2023 when it was split into two parishes: Fradley and Streethay.

The parish had an area of 26.5346 km^{2} (10.2451 sq mi) and in the 2021 census it had a population of 3,753.

== See also ==
- Listed buildings in Fradley and Streethay
