= Franche =

Franche may refer to:

- Franche, Worcestershire,
- Franche (grape), another name for the French wine grape Chenin blanc
- Franche-Comté ("Free County"), a region of France
