= Orgreave, Staffordshire =

Hamlet in Staffordshire, England

Coordinates: 52.74233°N 1.78222°W

Orgreave
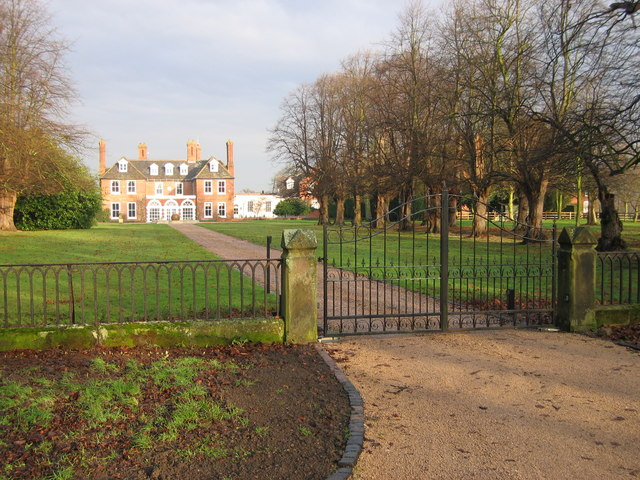
- Orgreave Hall

- Location within Staffordshire
- OS grid reference: SK148161
- Civil parish: Alrewas
- District: Lichfield
- Shire county: Staffordshire
- Region: West Midlands
- Country: England
- Sovereign state: United Kingdom
- Post town: BURTON-ON-TRENT
- Postcode district: DE13
- Dialling code: 01283
- Police: Staffordshire
- Fire: Staffordshire
- Ambulance: West Midlands
- UK Parliament: Lichfield

Orgreave is a hamlet and former civil parish, now in the parish of Alrewas, in the Lichfield district, in the county of Staffordshire, England. It lies in the Trent Valley some 6 1/2 miles (10.5 km) north-east of the city of Lichfield, the A513 road runs to the south of the hamlet. In 1881 the parish had a population of 113.

Historically Orgreave was a township of Alrewas and included the hamlet of Overley which is located between them at grid reference SK160156. From 1866 Orgreave was a civil parish in its own right, on 25 March 1884 the parish was abolished and merged with Alrewas, on 1 February 1996 that "Alrewas" was renamed "Alrewas and Fradley". On 1 April 2009 it became part of the new "Alrewas" parish.

Orgreave Hall, formerly a seat of the Viscounts Anson, is a private home.

== See also ==
- Listed buildings in Alrewas
