= Fritton =

Fritton may refer to the following places in Norfolk, England:

- Fritton, Great Yarmouth
- Fritton, North Norfolk, a location near Ludham
- Fritton (near Morning Thorpe), South Norfolk
