= Listed buildings in Fradley and Streethay =

Fradley and Streethay is a former civil parish in the district of Lichfield, Staffordshire, England. The parish contained 26 listed buildings that are recorded in the National Heritage List for England. All the listed buildings are designated at Grade II, the lowest of the three grades, which is applied to "buildings of national importance and special interest". The parish included the villages of Fradley and Streethay and the surrounding area. The Trent and Mersey Canal and Coventry Canal met in the parish at Fradley Junction, and the listed buildings on the canals are bridges, locks, workshops, and milestones. Most of the other listed buildings are houses, cottages and farmhouse, the earlier of which are timber framed. The other listed buildings include a well head, a hotel, and a public house.

== Buildings ==
Name and location	Photograph	Date	Notes
The Manor, Ryknild Street; 52.69502°N 1.78880°W	—	Early 17th century	The house, which was later altered and extended, is in red brick with sandstone dressings, on a sandstone plinth, and has a tile roof. There are two storeys and an attic, and a T-shaped plan, with a main range and a rear wing. The windows vary; those from the 17th century are mainly mullioned and chamfered, those from the 18th and 20th centuries are mainly casements, and there is a 20th-century bay window. The 17th-century doorway has a segmental head, and the doorway from the 20th century has a bracketed canopy.
18 Long Lane; 52.72097°N 1.76275°W	—	17th century	The cottage is timber framed with brick infill, and a thatched roof with a scalloped ridge. There is one storey and an attic, and an L-shaped plan, consisting of a main range of two bays, and a projecting gabled left wing. In the angle is a porch, the windows are casement windows, there are three eyebrow dormers, and in the wing is a garage door.
Old Hall Farmhouse; 52.72034°N 1.76889°W	—	17th century (probable)	The farmhouse was remodelled and extended in about 1700, and further extended to the rear in the 19th century. It is in red brick and has a tile roof. There are two storeys and an attic, and the front is in two parts. The left part has two bays, a parapet ramped up to the left, a large ground floor window, a bay window in the upper floor, two gabled dormers, and a lean-to porch. The right part has three bays, a gable implying a pediment containing a blind oval oculus with keystones, a porch with an embattled parapet, sash windows, and five blind attic panels.
Plunge Bath; 52.69484°N 1.78921°W	—	17th century (probable)	A well head, it consists of a square stone building with a doorway to the east, and a corbelled stone roof surmounted by a foliated finial.
Thatch Cottage, Long Lane; 52.72118°N 1.76379°W	—	17th century	The cottage is timber framed with brick infill, and a thatched roof with a scalloped ridge. There is one storey and an attic, and a T-shaped plan, consisting of a two-bay main range and a rear wing. The doorway has a bracketed canopy, the windows are casements, and there are two eyebrow dormers.
The Croft, Old Hall Lane; 52.71924°N 1.76783°W	—	17th century	The cottage was largely rebuilt in the 18th century when timber framing was replaced by brick, which is now painted.. The roof is tiled, there is one storey and an attic, and three bays. On the front is a gabled porch, the windows are casements, there are three gabled dormers, and some exposed timber framing to the right of the porch.
Oldbrook Cottage, Church Lane; 52.72000°N 1.76198°W		Late 17th century	The cottage is timber framed and rendered, and has a tile roof. There is one storey and an attic, three bays, and a short south bay. The windows are casements and there is an eyebrow dormer.
Alrewas Hayes Farmhouse; 52.72983°N 1.79895°W	—	Early 18th century	The farmhouse, which was extended later, is in red brick with storey bands, a dentilled eaves band, and a tile roof. There are two storeys and an attic, a main range of five bays, a one-bay extension to the left, and a rear wing. The central doorway has a pediment, the windows in the main range are sashes with segmental heads, and in the extension they are casements.
Brownsfield Farmhouse; 52.69619°N 1.81094°W	—	Early 18th century	A red brick farmhouse with rusticated quoins, a storey band, a dentilled eaves band, and a tile roof. There are two storeys and an attic, two parallel ranges, and four bays. On the front is a gabled porch, and the windows are casements with segmental heads.
Curborough Farmhouse; 52.70671°N 1.80924°W	—	Early to mid 18th century	A red brick farmhouse with a dentilled eaves band and a tile roof. There is one storey and an attic, two parallel ranges, and a rear wing. On the front are three bays, the middle bay gabled. There is a bay window with a hipped roof, the other windows are casements with segmental heads, and there is a gabled dormer.
Fradley Arms Hotel, Ryknild Street; 52.71421°N 1.76179°W	—	18th century	A house, later a hotel, it is in painted brick with a tile roof. There are three storeys, and an L-shaped plan, consisting of a three-bay front range and a rear wing. The central doorway has panelled pilasters, a fanlight, and a dentilled frieze. In the ground floor the windows are fixed, and elsewhere they are sashes, those in the rear wing with segmental heads.
Cedar House, Ryknild Street; 52.69165°N 1.79118°W	—	Mid to late 18th century	A red brick house with a dentilled eaves band and a tile roof. There are two storeys and an attic, and three bays. The central doorway has a rectangular fanlight, the windows are a mix of sashes and casements, and there are two hipped dormers.
Lodge Croft, Old Hall Lane; 52.71960°N 1.76742°W	—	Mid to late 18th century	A red brick farmhouse with a dentiled eaves band and a tile roof. There are three storeys and three bays. The central doorway has a bracketed hood, in the ground floor are two bay windows with hipped roofs, and the other windows are casements, those in the lower two floors with segmental heads.
Milestone at SK 15451154; 52.70127°N 1.77306°W	—	Late 18th century	The milestone is on the towpath of the Coventry Canal. It is in stone, and has a square section and a rounded top. The milestone is set at an angle, and the faces are inscribed with numbers.
Roddige Farmhouse; 52.72011°N 1.74693°W	—	Late 18th century	A red brick farmhouse with dentilled eaves and a tile roof. There are two storeys, and a T-shaped plan, consisting of a main range of three bays and a rear wing. The central doorway has a fanlight, and the windows are sashes.
Streethay House Farmhouse; 52.69223°N 1.79020°W	—	Late 18th century	The farmhouse, which was later extended, is in roughcast brick with a moulded eaves band and a hipped tile roof. There are two storeys, a main range of three bays, a single-bay service wing on the same alignment, and a rear wing. In the centre is a Tuscan porch, and the windows are sashes. On the service wing is a canted bay window.
Bridge No. 50 and Keeper's Lock; 52.72554°N 1.78769°W		1770s	The bridge carries Hay End Road over the Trent and Mersey Canal, and the lock is to the southwest. The bridge is in red brick with stone dressings, and consists of a single four-centred arch with abutments sweeping round to each side. The lock has wooden gates.
Bridge No. 51 and lock 52.72394°N 1.79264°W		1770s	The bridge carries a footpath over the Trent and Mersey Canal, and the lock is to the southwest. The bridge is in red brick with stone dressings, and consists of a single segmental arch with a plain parapet. The lock has wooden and steel gates.
Bridge No. 52 and Shade House Lock; 52.72191°N 1.79842°W		1770s	The bridge carries a footpath over the Trent and Mersey Canal, and the lock is to the southwest. The bridge is in red brick with stone dressings, and consists of a single four-centred arch. The lock has steel gates.
Hunt's Lock; 52.72622°N 1.78605°W		1770s	The lock is on the Trent and Mersey Canal, and to the northeast of Fradley Junction. It is in brick with stone edging and has wooden gates. Stone steps flank the front of the lock to the northeast.
Middle Lock; 52.72268°N 1.78605°W		1770s	The lock is on the Trent and Mersey Canal, and to the southeast of Fradley Junction. It is in brick with stone edging and has steel gates. The front of the lock is flanked by flights of stone steps.
The Swan and attached buildings 52.72375°N 1.79367°W		1770s	A row of buildings overlooking Fradley Junction, with a public house in the centre, a former warehouse to the left, and a cottage to the right. They are in red brick, the public house is painted, they have slate roofs, and two storeys, and contain casement windows. The former warehouse to the left has a pediment, four bays, segmental-headed arches, a large double door and a smaller door, and a loading door in the upper floor. The inn has three bays, a bay window with a hipped roof, and a doorway with a pediment, and the cottage has three bays and windows with segmental heads.
Milestone at SK 14861039; 52.69113°N 1.78148°W	—	c. 1785	The milestone is on the towpath of the Coventry Canal. It is in stone with a triangular plan, and two faces are inscribed with numbers.
Ivy Leigh and attached cottages 52.72401°N 1.79294°W		Early 19th century	A row of three canal workers' cottages at Fradley Junction, they are in red brick with slate roofs, and have two storeys, two bays each, and a double-depth plan. The left cottage is narrower and has a doorway with a round head and a fanlight, the right cottage has a gabled porch, and the windows are sashes.
Wharf House; 52.72363°N 1.79286°W	—	Early to mid 19th century	A red brick house with an eaves band and a hipped slate roof. There are two storeys, a roughly square plan, and three bays. The doorway has a rectangular fanlight, and the windows are casements with segmental heads.
Workshops near Fradley Junction; 52.72430°N 1.79060°W	—	1872	The workshops are to the east of Fradley Junction, and are in red brick with slate roofs. They have one storey and eleven bays, there is one sash window, the other windows are casements, and there are doorways, all with segmental heads.
