= Listed buildings in Alrewas =

Alrewas is a civil parish in the district of Lichfield, Staffordshire, England. It contains 51 listed buildings that are recorded in the National Heritage List for England. Of these, one is at Grade I, the highest of the three grades, and the others are at Grade II, the lowest grade. The parish contains the village of Alrewas, the smaller settlement of Orgreave, and the surrounding area. Most of the listed buildings are in the village of Alrewas, most of these are houses and cottages, and a high proportion of them are timber framed or have timber-framed cores. The Trent and Mersey Canal and the River Trent pass through the parish, and a bridge crossing the canal is listed. The other listed buildings include a church, memorials in the churchyard, a small country house and its stable block, farmhouses and farm buildings, a public house, two mileposts, and a war memorial.

== Key ==
Grade	Criteria
I	Buildings of exceptional interest, sometimes considered to be internationally important
II	Buildings of national importance and special interest

== Buildings ==
Name and location	Photograph	Date	Notes	Grade
All Saints Church; 52.73481°N 1.75320°W		13th century	The church was extended in the 14th, 16th and 19th centuries, and is built in sandstone with lead roofs. The church consists of a nave, north and south aisles, a south porch, a chancel, and a west tower. The tower has three stages, angle buttresses, a west door over which is a three-light window, and an embattled parapet with crocketed corner pinnacles. The west door and the north door are both Norman, and both have been re-set.	I
Park House, William IV Road; 52.73370°N 1.74674°W	—	15th century (probable)	The house, on a corner site, was altered and extended on a number of occasions, and in the 20th century an agricultural building was incorporated. It has a timber framed core, it has been much rebuilt in brick, and has a tile roof. There are two storeys, dentilled eaves, a three-bay hall range, and a cross-wing on the left with a hipped roof. The windows are sashes with segmental heads, and the former agricultural building contains casement windows. There is some exposed timber framing on a gable end, and much more internally.	II
The White House, 76 Main Street; 52.73232°N 1.74529°W		15th century (possible)	The house, which has been altered, is timber framed with brick infill and some rebuilding in brick, and has a thatched roof. There is one storey and an attic, and three bays. The windows are casements, and there is an eyebrow dormer.	II
112 Main Street; 52.73270°N 1.74816°W		16th century (probable)	The house was partly rebuilt in the 17th century and altered later. It is timber framed with cruck construction, brick infill and some rebuilding in brick. The 16th-century part has a hipped thatched roof with a scalloped ridge, and the roof of the later part is tiled. The 16th-century part has one storey and an attic, and the later part has two storeys. The windows are casements, and in the earlier part is an eyebrow dormer. Inside the early part is a cruck truss, and there is a reused cruck truss in the later part.	II
Mill End House; 52.73460°N 1.75449°W	—	16th century	A timber framed house with cruck construction, brick infill, some plastering, some rebuilding in brick, and a thatched roof with a scalloped ridge. There is one storey and an attic, and an L-shaped plan, consisting of a two-bay hall range and a gabled two-bay cross-wing. On the hall range is a gabled porch, the windows are casements, and in the cross-wing is a cruck truss.	II
Willow Cottage, 55 Main Street; 52.73273°N 1.74641°W	—	16th century	The house was later extensively remodelled, it is timber framed with cruck construction, brick infill, extensions in brick, and a tile roof. There is a T-shaped plan, consisting of a hall range with one storey and an attic, and a gabled cross-wing to the left with two storeys. In the angle on the front is a porch, the windows are casements, and in the right gable end is a cruck truss.	II
25 Dark Lane; 52.73426°N 1.74415°W	—	Late 16th century	The house has been altered and extended. It is timber framed with brick infill, additions and repairs are in brick, and it has a tile roof. There is one storey and an attic, two bays, and a single-bay extension at each end. On the front is a lean-to porch, the windows are casements with latticed panes, and there are three gabled dormers.	II
Barn, Manor Farm; 52.73312°N 1.75529°W	—	Early 17th century	The barn was altered in the 19th and 20th centuries, and used for other purposes. It is timber framed with brick infill, some rebuilding in brick, and it has a roof of Staffordshire blue tile. There is one tall storey and four bays. The openings include doorways and a taking-in door in a gabled dormer.	II
Stable, 21 Church Road; 52.73537°N 1.75434°W	—	17th century	The stable was extended in the 18th century. The original part is timber framed, the extension is in brick, and the roof is tiled. There is one storey and two bays, and it contains one doorway.	II
69 Main Street; 52.73291°N 1.74782°W		17th century	A timber framed house with brick infill and a thatched roof. There is one storey and an attic, and three bays. The windows are casements, and there is an eyebrow dormer.	II
88 Main Street; 52.73248°N 1.74622°W		17th century	A timber framed house, it has a tile roof, two storeys, and three bays. The windows are casements, and inside is a timber-framed partition.	II
110 Main Street; 52.73267°N 1.74772°W		17th century	The house, which was partly remodelled in the 18th century, is timber framed and partly roughcast, and has a tile roof. There is one storey and an attic, and three bays. The windows are casements with segmental heads, and there are two eyebrow dormers.	II
113 and 115 Main Street; 52.73303°N 1.75291°W	—	17th century	A pair of houses incorporating a shop on the left. They have a timber framed core, the outer walls are replaced in brick and painted, and the roof is tiled. There is one storey and an attic, a storey band, and an L-shaped plan with a range of two bays and a projecting gabled wing on the left. In the main range are casement windows with segmental heads, and two gabled dormers. The wing contains a shop front in the ground floor and an attic window above.	II
138 and 140 Main Street; 52.73286°N 1.75160°W	—	17th century	A house, later divided, in timber framing with brick infill and a tile roof. There is one storey and an attic, and four bays. The windows, which are casements, are spaced irregularly, and there are two gabled dormers.	II
11 Mill End Road; 52.73434°N 1.75344°W	—	17th century	A timber framed house with brick infill, and a thatched roof with a shaped ridge. There is one storey and an attic, three bays, and a single-bay extension to the west. The windows are casements, and there are four eyebrow dormers.	II
37 Mill End Road; 52.73590°N 1.75487°W	—	17th century	A timber framed house with plastered infill and a thatched roof with a scalloped ridge. There is one storey and an attic, three bays, and a lean-to on the left. The doorway has a thatched canopy, the windows are casements, and there are two eyebrow dormers.	II
22 Park Road; 52.73410°N 1.74718°W	—	17th century	The house was later altered and extended. The original part is timber framed with brick infill, the extension is in brick, and the roof is tiled. There is one storey and an attic, and an L-shaped plan, consisting of a gabled one-bay wing to the right, and a later one-bay range to the left. In the gable end is a bay window and two windows above, and the later range also contains a bay window, and has a gabled dormer above. The other windows are casements with segmental heads.	II
74 Park Road; 52.73319°N 1.74391°W	—	17th century	A house that was later altered, it is timber framed with brick infill, some rebuilding in brick, and a tile roof. There is one storey and an attic, and an L-shaped plan with three bays, the right bay projecting as a gabled wing. The windows are casements, and there is a central eyebrow dormer.	II
3 Post Office Road; 52.73318°N 1.74921°W	—	17th century (probable)	The house was remodelled and extended in the 19th century. It is timber framed and encased in painted brick, and has a slate roof. There are two storeys, two bays, and a rear outshut. The windows are casements, and there is exposed timber framing internally.	II
Alley Thatch, 166A Main Street; 52.73270°N 1.75379°W	—	17th century	A timber framed cottage with a thatched roof, one storey and an attic, and two bays. It contains a casement window, a doorway, and an eyebrow dormer.	II
Barcleycorn Cottage, 13 and 15 Church Road; 52.73524°N 1.75287°W	—	17th century	The cottage has been remodelled, extended, and divided into two. It has a timber framed core, much of the timber framing has been replaced in brick, and the extension is in brick. The roof is tiled, there is one storey and an attic, and a dentilled eaves band. The cottage consists of a main range of three bays, and a later projecting gabled wing on the left. The windows are casements, and inside is exposed timber framing.	II
Essington House, 85 Main Street; 52.73290°N 1.75062°W	—	17th century	The house was largely rebuilt in the 18th century and altered in the 19th century. It has a timber framed core, and is in red brick with corner pilaster strips, and a tile roof. There are two storeys and four bays. The doorway has a bracketed hood, the windows are casements with segmental heads, and inside are timber-framed walls.	II
Fiddler's Rest, 20 Park Road; 52.73432°N 1.74744°W	—	17th century	The house, that was later altered, is at right angles to the road. It is timber framed with brick infill, extensions in brick, and a thatched roof with a scalloped ridge. There are two storeys and three bays. On the front are two porches, one thatched, one gabled, and the windows are casements.	II
Gable End, 70 Main Street; 52.73228°N 1.74515°W	—	17th century	A timber framed house with brick infill, some rebuilding in brick, and a tile roof. There is one storey and an attic and three bays. The windows are casements with leaded lights, and there are two gabled dormers.	II
Jasmine Cottage, Post Office Road; 52.73412°N 1.74873°W		17th century	The house, which has been extended, is timber framed, the extension is in brick painted to resemble timber framing, and the roof is thatched with a scalloped ridge. There is one storey and an attic, and three bays. The windows are casements, there are three eyebrow dormers, and on the front are garage doors.	II
Manor Farmhouse, Kings Bromley Road; 52.73280°N 1.75525°W	—	17th century	The farmhouse was largely rebuilt in the 19th century. It is in red brick with stone dressings, including quoins, and has a roof of Staffordshire blue tile. There is an L-shaped plan, with a main block of two storeys and an attic, and a wing with two storeys, then one storey and an attic, a stair projection, and a single-storey outbuilding. The arched doorway has pilaster and a pediment, and the windows vary, some are mullioned, others are transomed, there are casement windows, and two gabled dormers. Inside, there is a timber framed partition.	II
Riverway Cottage, Mill End Lane; 52.73573°N 1.75481°W	—	17th century	The house, which was later extended, is timber framed, the extensions are in brick painted to resemble timber framing, and the roof is tiled. There are two storeys and two bays. The porch is gabled, the windows are casements, and inside is a timber-framed partition.	II
Shakespeare Cottage, 78, 78A, 80 and 82 Main Street; 52.73240°N 1.74571°W		17th century	The cottage, which was extended in the 19th century and has been divided, is timber framed, and has a thatched roof. There are two storeys and an L-shaped plan, with a one-bay hall range, and a two-bay cross-wing. The windows are casements, and there are eyebrow dormers.	II
Thatch End, 131 Main Street; 52.73304°N 1.75383°W	—	17th century	The cottage was extended to the right in the 20th century. The original part is timber framed with brick infill and a thatched roof with a scalloped ridge. There is one storey and an attic, two bays, casement windows, and an eyebrow dormer. The extension has one storey and an attic, one bay, and a dormer with a hipped roof.	II
Thatchover Cottage, 66 Park Road; 52.73330°N 1.74428°W	—	17th century	The cottage, which was later extended, is at right angles to the road. It is timber framed with brick infill, some rebuilding in brick, and a thatched roof with a scalloped ridge. There is one storey and an attic, two bays, and a later recessed one-bay one-storey extension to the left. The windows are casements, those in the ground floor with segmental heads.	II
The Tudor of Lichfield; 71 Main Street; 52.73287°N 1.74796°W		17th century	A house, later a shop, at right angles to the road. It is timber framed with brick infill and has a tile roof, one storey and two bays. In the gable end facing the street is a 20th-century bow window.	II
Tilty Cottage, Mill End Lane; 52.73577°N 1.75512°W	—	17th century	The cottage is timber framed with some repairs in brick, it is plastered externally, and the roof is tiled. There is one storey and an attic, and two bays. The windows are casements, and there is an eyebrow dormer.	II
Upper Lupin Farmhouse; 52.74203°N 1.78802°W	—	17th century	The farmhouse was later extended. The original part is timber framed, the extensions are in brick painted to resemble timber framing, and the roof is tiled. There is one storey and an attic, two bays, a single-bay extension to the left, and a two-storey one-bay rear wing. The doorway has a bracketed canopy, the windows are casements, and there are two gabled dormers.	II
Westgate, 16 Mill End Lane; 52.73443°N 1.75390°W	—	17th century	A house incorporating a former barn, the barn being the older part; both parts have tile roofs. The barn is timber framed with one storey, three bays, and it contains garage doors and a window. The house dates from the 19th century, it is in red brick with dentilled eaves, two storeys and three bays. The doorway has a bracketed pediment, there are large bay windows to the right with hipped roofs, and the other windows are casements with segmental heads.	II
Orgreave Hall and stables 52.74153°N 1.77937°W		1668 (probable)	A small country house that was remodelled in the 18th century, it is in red brick with tile roofs. The south front has a moulded eaves cornice, two storeys and an attic, two bays, and projecting two-bay wings with hipped roofs and storey bands. There is a central doorway flanked by windows with semicircular heads, and the other windows are earlier sashes. The fronts of the wings are linked by three-bay arcade that has semicircular arches with keystones and a cornice containing a sundial. To the right is a single-storey link to a two-storey, three-bay house, which is further linked to a two-storey stable block. The south block is in Baroque style, and has three storeys, a partly balustraded parapet swept down at the ends, and seven bays. The central doorway has Corinthian pilasters and a scrolled swan-neck pediment, and the windows are sashes with segmental heads and keystones.	II
Bridge Cottage, 4 Church Road; 52.73456°N 1.74987°W	—	Late 17th century	The cottage has been altered and extended. It has a timber framed core, largely replaced by plastered brick, and a thatched roof with a scalloped ridge. There is one storey and an attic, and it consists of a two-bay main range with single-bay extensions at each end, a single-storey lean-to on the right, a two-storey extension to the left with a dentilled eaves band, and a single-storey gabled projection to its left. The windows are casements and eyebrow dormers.	II
Clematis Cottage, 9 Exchange Road; 52.73320°N 1.74496°W		Late 17th century	The cottage, which has been extended and altered, is timber framed and rendered, and has a thatched roof with a scalloped ridge. There is one storey and an attic, and three bays. The windows are casements, and there are three eyebrow dormers.	II
19 Church Road; 52.73518°N 1.75385°W	—	c. 1700	A brick house with a tile roof, a storey band, one storey and an attic. It has an L-shaped plan, consisting of a two-bay hall range and a two-bay cross-wing. There is a gabled porch, the windows are casements, and there are two gabled dormers. Inside are timber framed partition walls, and an inglenook fireplace with a chamfered bressumer.	II
Stable, Manor Farm; 52.73284°N 1.75556°W	—	Early 18th century (probable)	The stable, which was extended in the 19th century and used for other purposes, is in yellowish brick on a plinth, with a roof in Staffordshire blue tile. There are two storeys, three bays, and a rear lean-to. The doorways and the windows, which are casements, have segmental heads.	II
Old Eaves, 158 Main Street; 52.73286°N 1.75307°W	—	Early to mid 18th century	A red brick house with a storey band, a dentilled eaves band, and a tile roof. There are two storeys and an attic, and three bays. The central doorway has a bracketed hood, the window above it is blind, the other windows are casements with segmental heads, and there are two gabled dormers.	II
21 Church Road; 52.73517°N 1.75411°W		Mid 18th century	The house, which was altered later, is in red brick with a tile roof. There are two storeys and an attic, three bays, and a single-storey extension to the left. The windows are casements with segmental heads, and there are three gabled dormers.	II
Home Farmhouse, Main Street; 52.73269°N 1.74976°W	—	18th century	The farmhouse, which has been altered and extended, is in red brick with a tile roof. It consists of a main range with one storey and an attic and three bays, a right wing with two storeys and a dentilled eaves band, and a left wing with three storeys and a half-hipped roof. The doorway has a bracketed pedimented hood, and to the left is a tripartite sash window. The other windows are casements, most with segmental heads, and in the main range are two eyebrow dormers. On the right front is a Tuscan portico.	II
Cobwebb Cottage, 25 Mill End Lane; 52.73533°N 1.75462°W	—	18th century	The cottage is in red brick, and has a thatched roof with a scalloped ridge. There is one storey and an attic, and two bays, the left bay gabled. The porch has a thatched roof, the windows are casements, and there is a gabled dormer.	II
The George and Dragon, Main Street; 52.73267°N 1.74898°W		Mid to late 18th century	The public house is in red brick with corbelled eaves and a tile roof. There are three storeys, three bays, and rear extensions. The windows are casements with segmental heads.	II
Gaskell's Bridge; 52.73485°N 1.74975°W		Late 18th century	This is bridge No. 46 over the Trent and Mersey Canal, and carries Church Road over the canal. It is in red brick with stone coping, and consists of a single segmental arch with a humped back and swept wings ending in piers at the four corners.	II
Pair of chest tombs 52.73504°N 1.75224°W	—	Late 18th century	The tombs are in the churchyard of All Saints Church, and are to the memory of Elizabeth and Henry Smith. They are in stone and each has a rectangular plan. Both have consoles projecting from each corner, and the tomb to the north has a wreath at its west end.	II
2 Post Office Road; 52.73302°N 1.74974°W	—	Early 19th century	The house, which was later extended, is in painted brick with dentilled eaves and a tile roof. There are two storeys, the original block has two bays, there is a two-bay lower service wing to the right, and a later right cross-wing. The doorway has a fluted surround and a cornice, the windows in the main block are sashes, and elsewhere they are casements.	II
Cowhouse, Manor Farm; 52.73303°N 1.75508°W	—	Mid 19th century	The cowhouse is in red brick with a roof in Staffordshire blue tile. There is one storey, seven bays, and a partial outshut. On the east front casement window with blue-brick sills alternate with segmental-arched doorways.	II
Milepost at N.G.R. SK 14881563; 52.73810°N 1.78089°W		Mid to late 19th century	The milepost is on the north side of the A513 road. It is in cast iron and has a triangular section with a chamfered top. On the top is "KINGS BROMLEY" and on the sides are the distances to Alrewas, Burton upon Trent, Tamworth, Kings Bromley, Handsacre, Armitage, Rugeley, and Stafford.	II
Milepost at N.G.R. SK 18021459; 52.72871°N 1.73463°W		Mid to late 19th century	The milepost is on the northeast side of the Croxall Road. It is in cast iron and has a triangular section with a chamfered top. On the top is "ALREWAS PARISH" and on the sides are the distances to Alrewas, Burton upon Trent, and Tamworth.	II
Alrewas War Memorial; 52.73285°N 1.74960°W		1921	The war memorial stands in the Village Green at a road junction. It is in grey granite, and consists of a Latin cross on a square tapering plinth with a cornice, on a base of three square steps. On the front face of the plinth is an inscription, on the other faces are the names of those lost in the First World War, and on the middle step of the base are the names of those lost in the Second World War.	II
