= Alrewas and Fradley =

Former civil parish in Staffordshire, England

Coordinates: 52.73°N 1.76°W

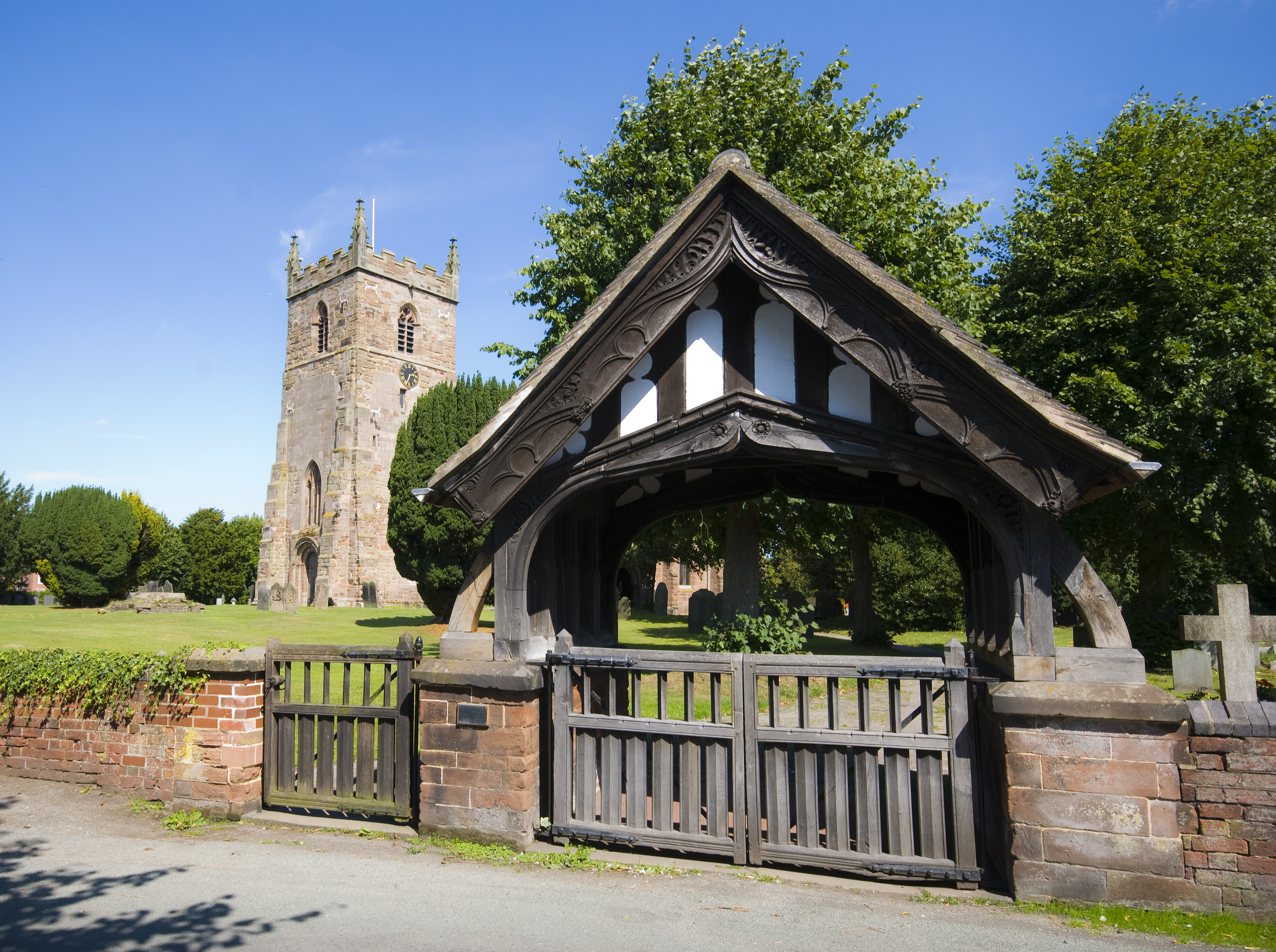
- Lychgate and west tower of All Saints' parish church, Alrewas, Staffordshire, seen from Mill End Lane

- Location within Staffordshire
- Population: 4,686 (2001 census)
- Civil parish: Alrewas; Fradley and Streethay
- District: Lichfield
- Shire county: Staffordshire
- Region: West Midlands
- Country: England
- Sovereign state: United Kingdom

Alrewas and Fradley, was a large civil parish in the Lichfield district of Staffordshire, England. The parish included the villages of Alrewas, Fradley and Orgreave, and in 2001 had a population of 4,686.

== History ==
On 25 March 1884 Alrewas Hays, Fradley and Orgreave parishes were merged with Alrewas, on 1 February the parish was renamed from "Alrewas" to "Alrewas & Fradley". on 1 April 2009 it was divided into the two new parishes of Alrewas and Fradley and Streethay. On 1 April 2023 Fradley and Streethay were separated. Alrewas, Fradley and Streethay are now separate Parishes.https://www.fradleyparishcouncil.gov.uk
