= Streethay =

Village in Staffordshire, England

Coordinates: 52.691°N 1.791°W

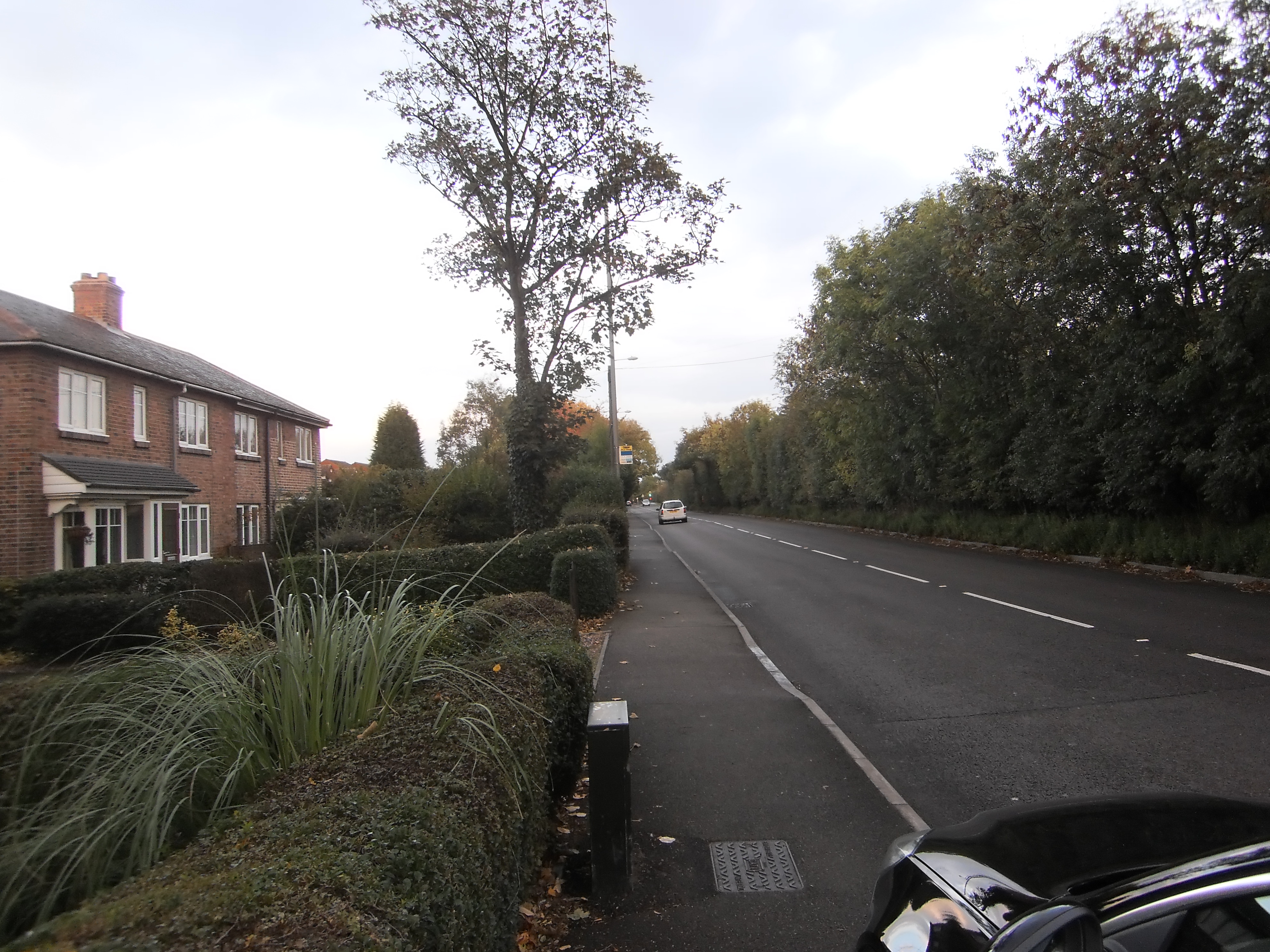
- Streethay

- Location within Staffordshire
- Population: 1,111 (2001)
- OS grid reference: SK142105
- Civil parish: Streethay
- District: Lichfield
- Shire county: Staffordshire
- Region: West Midlands
- Country: England
- Sovereign state: United Kingdom
- Post town: LICHFIELD
- Postcode district: WS13
- Dialling code: 01543
- Police: Staffordshire
- Fire: Staffordshire
- Ambulance: West Midlands
- UK Parliament: Lichfield

Streethay is a village and civil parish, in the Lichfield district, in the county of Staffordshire, England, adjoining the city of Lichfield, on the east side of the West Coast Main Line railway. In 2001 the parish had a population of 1,111.

== Village amenities ==
Streethay has a range of shops, cafes and takeaway outlets. The main road through the village Old Burton Road (A5127 road), which starts at the A38 road junction and the road used to be the main route into Birmingham before the A38 was constructed. There was a former public house called 'The Anchor' which has been converted into flats and business premises. There is a children's play park on the A5127 Burton Road. There is a bus service that stops in Streethay, which continues onto Lichfield and Burton Upon Trent, calling at the villages of Fradley and Alrewas.

Further up the A5127 road to Lichfield there is Lichfield Trent Valley railway station which is on the West Coast Mainline. The northern spur of phase 1 of HS2 rail line will run just east of the village, linking with the West Coast Main Line at Handsacre.

In 2012, Lichfield District Council approved plans for the development of 750 new homes, which were completed in 2021. The housing estate, known as Roman Heights, features three children's play areas located on Oak Way, Yoxall Way, and within the central open space of the estate.

In 2023, a new retail site was established to serve the growing population of Streethay. The retail park is located on Yoxall Way, near the junction with Oak Way.

In 2024, three new football pitches were opened on Thompson Way in Streethay.

== History ==
Streethay, east of Lichfield, was formerly a township in St. Michael's parish, Lichfield, covering 850 a. in the mid 19th century. It was adjoined on the south-east by Fulfen, a township of 240 a., also in St. Michael's. Both Streethay and Fulfen were civil parishes from the later 19th century. Boundary changes in 1879 transferred a detached portion of Farewell and Chorley parish north and east of Curborough House to Streethay and cottages at Darnford from Streethay to Fulfen. As the result of the changes Streethay had an area of 978 a. and Fulfen one of 250 a.

From 1866 Streethay was a civil parish in its own right. Further boundary changes in 1934 established a new civil parish of Streethay of 1,341 a; it comprised 852 a. of the existing parish of Streethay (the other 126 a. being added to Lichfield), 239 a. of Fulfen (the remainder being added to Whittington), 4 a. from Lichfield, and 246 a. from Whittington. In 1980 the parish lost 61 a. on the west side of Lichfield Eastern Bypass to Lichfield. In 1983 Streethay and Alrewas formed the grouped parish council of Alrewas with Streethay. On 1 April 2009 the parish was abolished to form Fradley and Streethay. On 1 April 2023 Streethay became a civil parish again.

== See also ==
- Listed buildings in Fradley and Streethay
