= All Saints Church, Alrewas =

All Saints' Church, Alrewas
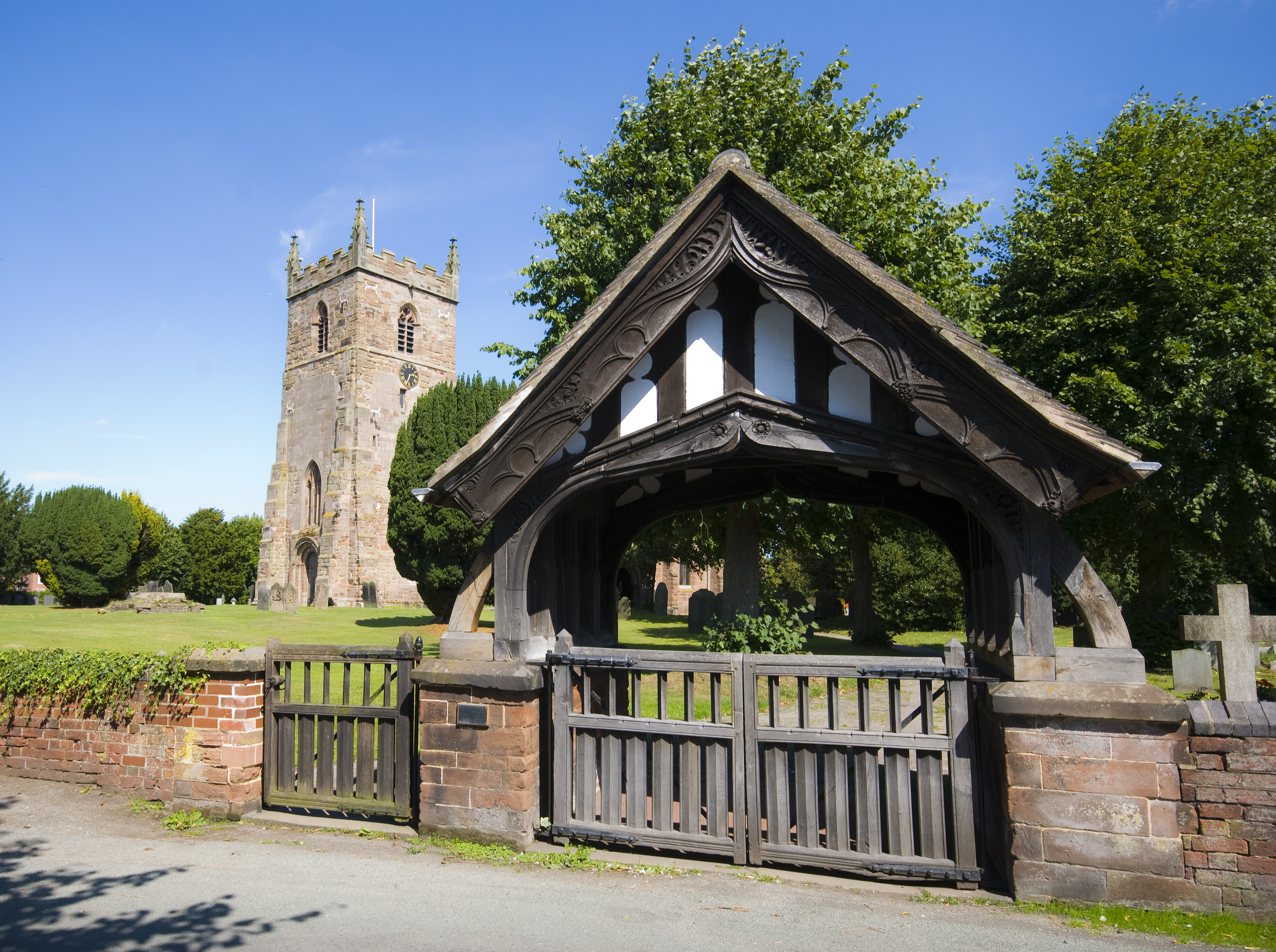
- All Saints' Church, Alrewas
- All Saints' Church, Alrewas
- 52.734764°N 1.753095°W
- OS grid reference: SK 16769 15267
- Location: Alrewas, Staffordshire
- Country: England
- Denomination: Anglican
- Website: www.alrewasallsaints.church

Architecture
- Functional status: Active
- Heritage designation: Grade I listed
- Designated: 20.11.1986
- Architectural type: Church
- Style: Gothic

Administration
- Province: Canterbury
- Diocese: Lichfield
- Archdeaconry: Lichfield
- Deanery: Lichfield
- Parish: Alrewas

Clergy
- Vicar: Prebend John W Allan

All Saints Church, Alrewas is a parish church in the village of Alrewas, Staffordshire in England. The church is situated in the north west of the village on the north side of the Trent & Mersey Canal. The church is a Grade I Listed Building. A church has stood on the current site since the 10th century. The current building was mainly built during the 13th, 14th, 16th and 19th centuries.

== History ==
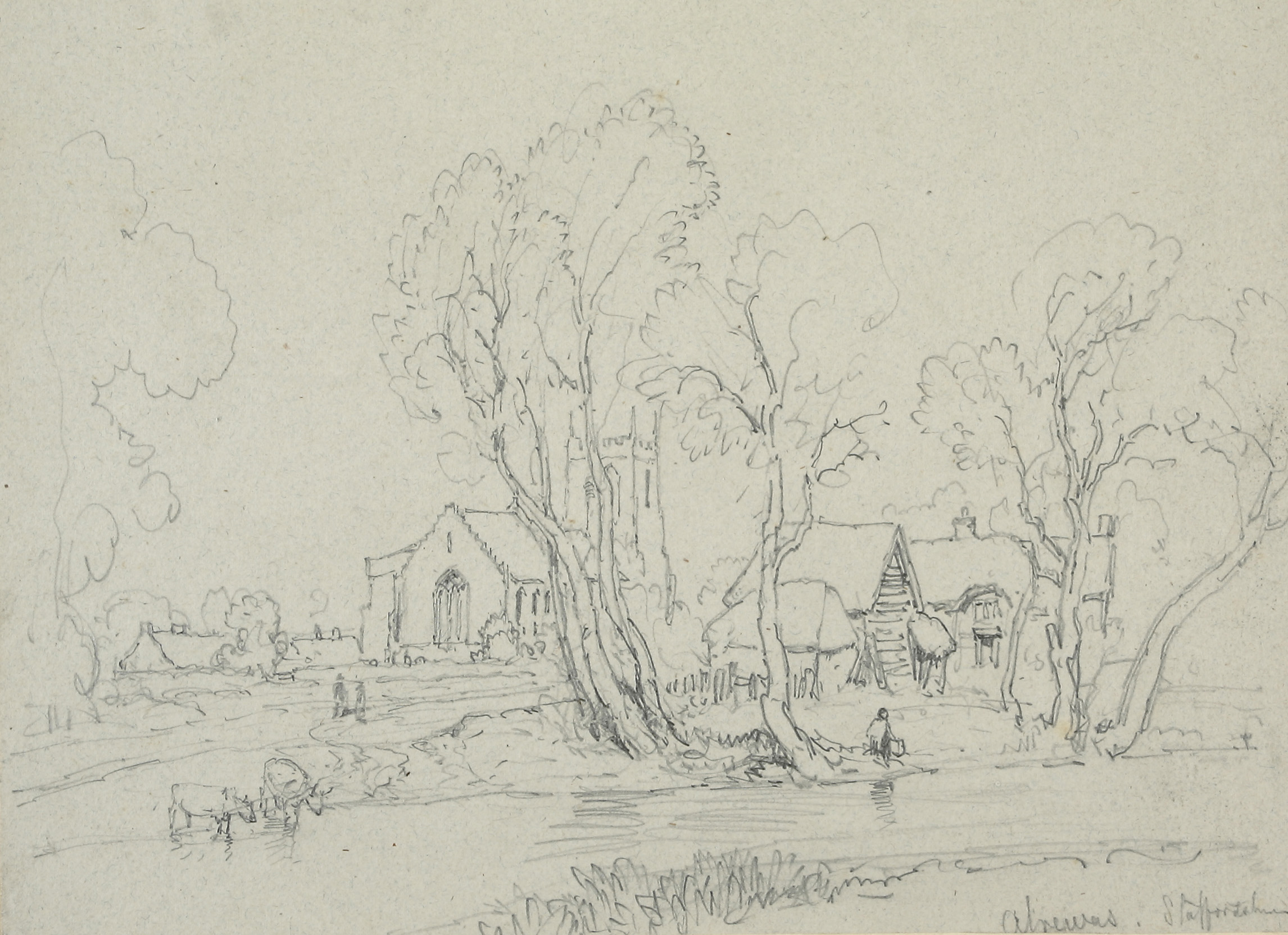
The church in a 19th-century drawing by one of the Lines family

A church has stood on the current site since at least 822AD. The original building was believed to be made of timber with a roof of thatched reeds. Alrewas at the time was a flourishing settlement in the ownership of Ælfgar, Earl of Mercia and it remained the property of King John until he granted it to Roger de Somerville to be followed by the Griffiths and later, the Turtons.

The Normans replaced the simple wooden church with one of local stone which probably occupied the space in the present nave between the two arcades. The tower doorway, the north aisle door and the heavy rough hewn pieces of masonry in the north wall are the oldest remaining parts of the church dating from the original Norman building.

During the 13th century the fine Early English chancel was added to the church complete with lancet windows, and in the south wall a piscina, a sedilia and priest's door. The small window in the north wall had a bell hung by it which was rung at the Consecration of the Sacrament. The present nave and south aisle were built during the 14th century and the original Norman doorway in the north wall was retained. Other features of the 14th century include the 'horse shoe' arch separating nave from chancel and also the majestic tower, the old Norman west door being re-set at its base.

In the 16th century the church was added to with the insertion of clerestory windows which run the length of both nave and chancel. The beautiful carved timber roofs of the nave and south aisle were also constructed during this period.

In 1866 the porch was rebuilt, above which is an old sundial and on the buttress to the right of the porch there is an ancient mass dial.

In 1877 the chancel was restored, the Early English east window was changed and filled with new stained glass by Holiday. The walls and roof of the chancel were repaired at the cost of Thomas Anson, 2nd Earl of Lichfield and the Vicar. The floor was laid with marble and tiles. A new reredos of Dumfries stone designed by the architect and executed by Poole of London was installed. A new carved screen was placed across the south aisle arch. The church reopened for worship on Wednesday 21 November 1877.

In 1891 the north aisle was built making the church symmetrical, the architect was Basil Champneys. The new aisle was built by R Bridgman at a cost of £1,600 (equivalent to £175,800 in 2025). Work started in March 1891 and lasted until November. The wall on the north side of the nave was carried 22 feet (6.7 m) further north, and arches and columns, richly moulded were constructed to carry the roof of English oak. All of the old stone was utilised and the north wall included a Norman doorway. The carved oak screen was put up by Revd. C.W. Bond and Miss Bond in memory of their father, who formerly lived in Alrewas. The floor was laid with wooden blocks made by Durry of London.

The stained glass in the windows of the north aisle were by Charles Eamer Kempe. The chancel screen was erected in 1892.

== Notable features ==
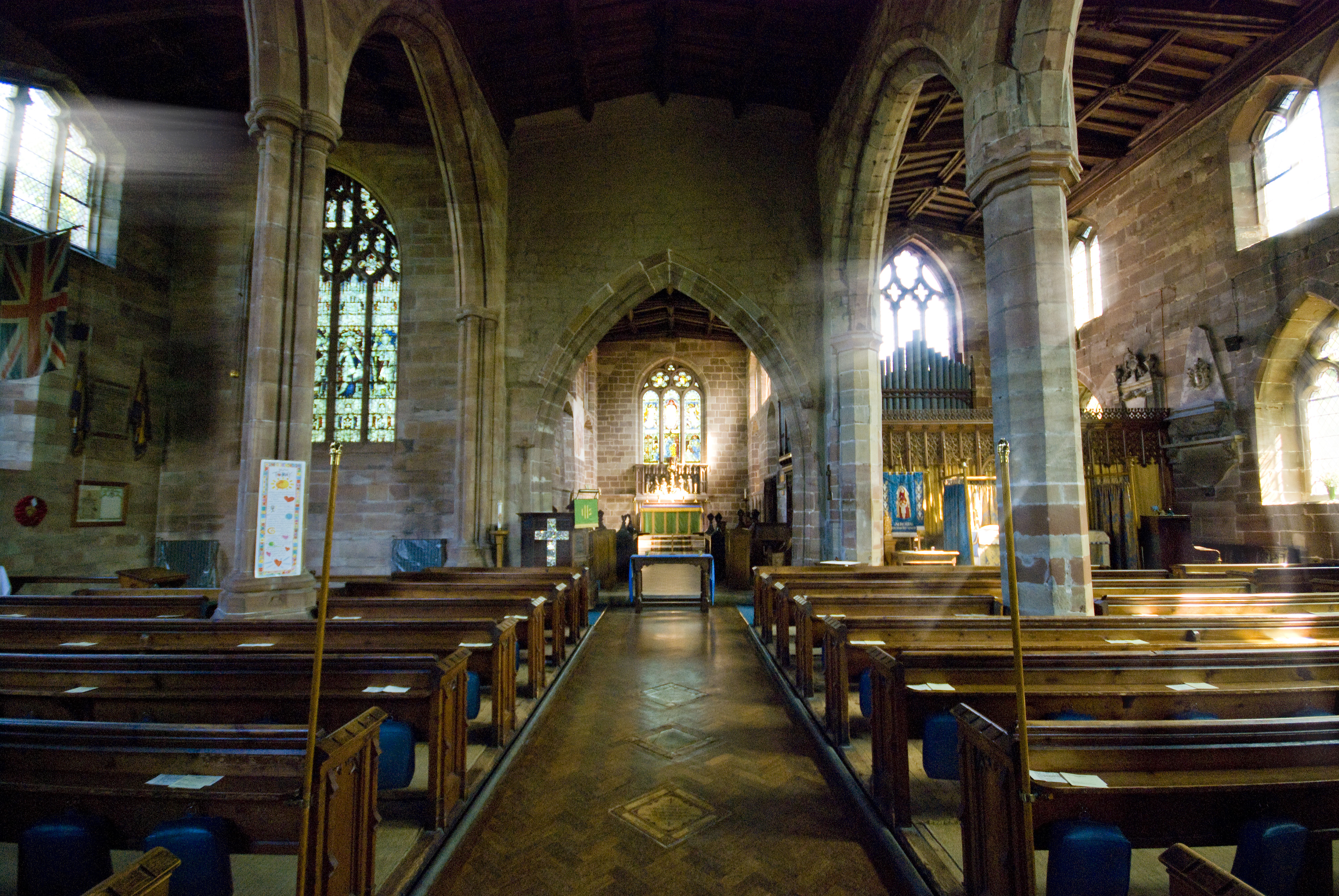
The Nave of All Saints

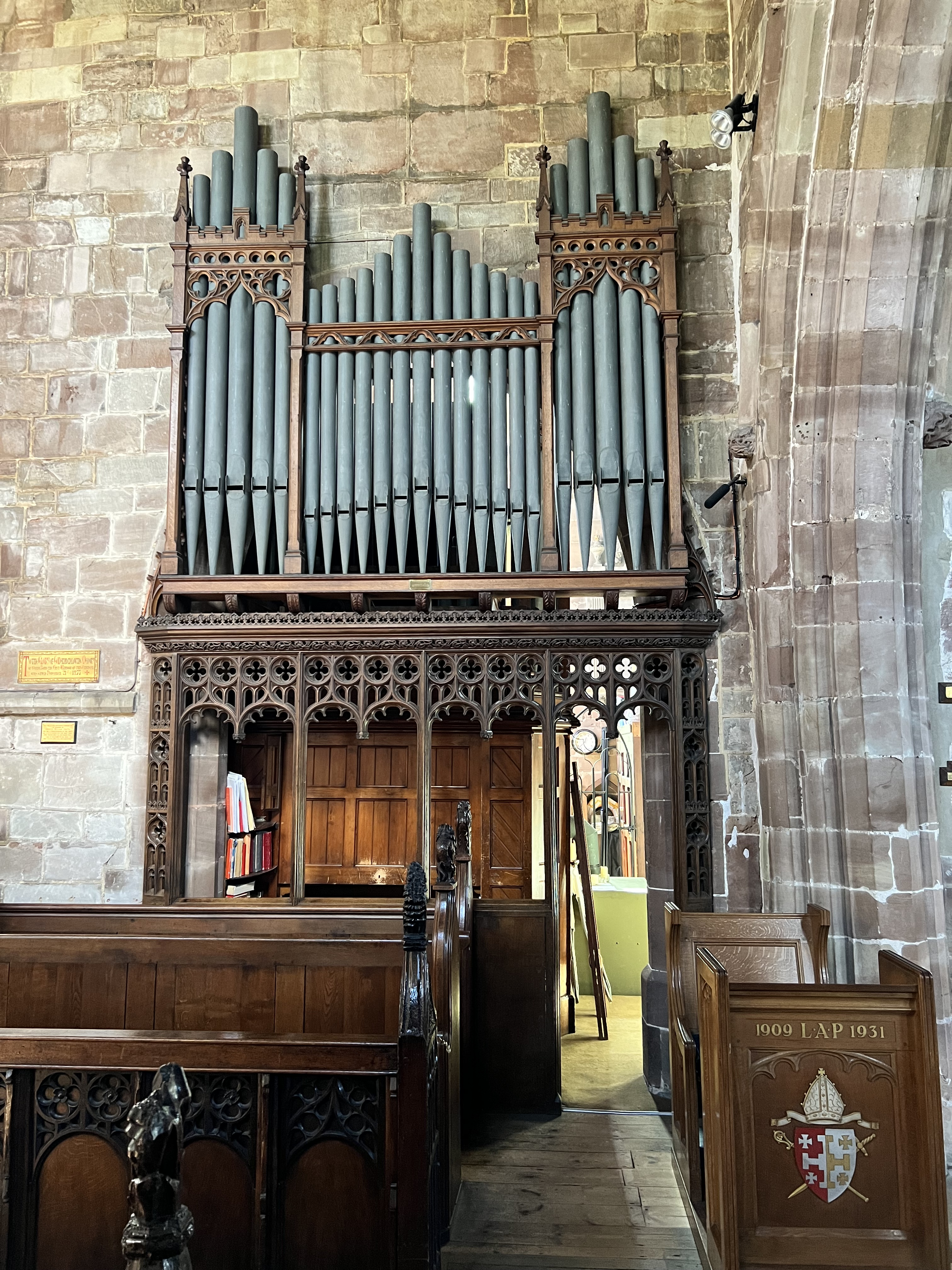
The organ by Brindley & Foster of 1882

- The church during the medieval period was highly decorated with wall paintings. During the Reformation, these paintings were all whitewashed over. During restoration work in the 19th century it was discovered that some paintings still existed when the whitewash was removed and the remaining fragment can be seen on the north wall of the chancel.
- The church has two ancient chests, once the repository of the Alrewas manorial court rolls. These chests probably date from the 14th century.
- The octagonal font in the church with four lions at its base dates from the 15th century.
- The carved wooden pulpit dates from 1639 and was provided during the Civil War period. It is one of the best examples of 17th-century woodwork in the county.
- The oak altar table dates from 1638.
- There are currently 8 bells in the church, recast in 1922 they replace previous castings from 1585, 1618 and 1711.
- There are some fine monuments at the east end of the south aisle. Two are from the 18th century and one a little earlier. This part of the church was the chapel of the Turton family, who at one time were Lords of the Manor.
- A new organ by Brindley & Foster was installed in 1882. Originally with 16 speaking stops, the pedal division has had an additional 3 stops added bringing the current total to 19. A specification of the organ can be found on the National Pipe Organ Register.
- A new turret clock was installed in 1887 at a cost of £124 (equivalent to £14,100 in 2025). It comprised 2 dials on the tower face, Cambridge Chimes, and was built by Mr Smith of Derby.

== Vicars of Alrewas ==
- 1547 Robert Alsop
- 1569 John Faulkner
- 1619 William Bockinge
- 1637 Richard Martin
- 1646 John Bould
- 1657 Thomas Bladen
- 1669 Isaac Sympson
- 1676 Jonathan Jenner
- 1696 John Bradley
- 1708 Matthias Langley
- 1728 Joshua Piper
- 1739 John Fletcher
- 17?? Daniel Remington
- 1789 Charles Baldwin
- 1797 John Edmunds
- 1801 John Wainwright (afterwards Rector of Sturmer, Essex)
- 1814 William Oster
- 1818 Hugo Bailye
- 1830 John Hinckley
- 1832 John Moore (formerly lecturer at St Martin in the Bull Ring, Birmingham)
- 1851 R.K. Haslehurst (afterwards Rector of West Felton)
- 1868 George Fraser
- 1869 William Horatio Walsh (afterwards vicar of Penn, Staffordshire)
- 1875 William Inge (afterwards Provost of Worcester College, Oxford)
- 1881 William James Webb (formerly incumbent of Bradwell)
- 1890 William A. Webb (formerly vicar of Wall)
- 1923 Edgar Burford
- 1929 Thomas H. Brookes (formerly curate at St Chad’s, Burton-on-Trent)
- 1931 Jasper Stoneman Caiger (formerly Rector of St John’s Church, Longton)
- 1937 W. Dennis Boone (formerly vicar of All Saints Wolverhampton)
- 1941 Hugh F. Hodge
- 1947 John Griffiths (formerly Rector of Leighton-under-the-Wrekin with Eaton Constantine)
- 1964 David H.N. Wells
- 1974 John E. Colston (formerly vicar of Christ Church, Tettenhall Wood, Wolverhampton)
- 1988 Stanley J. Morris
- 2001 John W. Allan

== Present ==
The church is still active in the village community today and holds Sunday services with an 8am Holy Communion and a 10am Family Service. There is also a bell ringing group associated with the church.

The church also gives its name to the All Saints Bowling Club situated between the church and the Trent & Mersey canal at the rear of the church. There is also All Saints Church of England Primary School, which is the main primary school in Alrewas.

== See also ==
- Grade I listed churches in Staffordshire
- Listed buildings in Alrewas
