= Frenchbeer =

Village in Devon, England

Coordinates: 50.6571°N 3.8744°W

- Location within Devon
- OS grid reference: SX6785
- Shire county: Devon
- Region: South West
- Country: England
- Sovereign state: United Kingdom
- Police: Devon and Cornwall
- Fire: Devon and Somerset
- Ambulance: South Western

Frenchbeer is a hamlet in Devon, England. It is in Dartmoor national park. Fernworthy reservoir is to the south and so is the South Teign river. Chagford is the nearest village with facilities.
