= Fradley =

Village in Staffordshire, England

Coordinates: 52.720°N 1.763°W

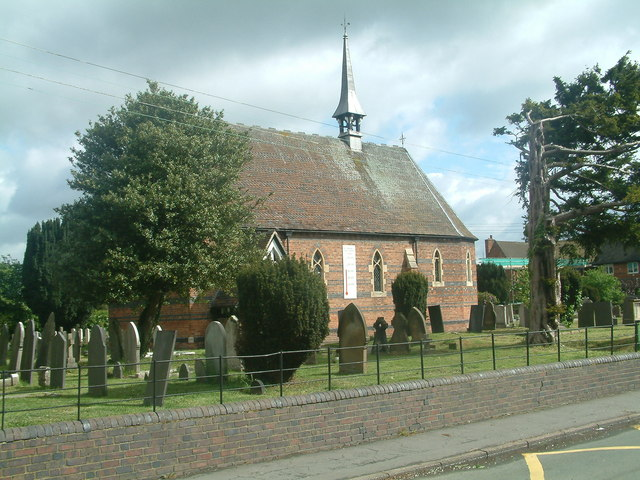
- St Stephen's Church

- Location within Staffordshire
- Civil parish: Fradley
- District: Lichfield
- Shire county: Staffordshire
- Region: West Midlands
- Country: England
- Sovereign state: United Kingdom
- Post town: LICHFIELD
- Postcode district: WS13
- Dialling code: 01283

Fradley is a village and civil parish in the Lichfield district of Staffordshire, England.

== Location ==
The village is about 3 miles (5 km) north-east of the Lichfield and 1 mile south-west of Alrewas, consisting of two discrete areas, the older Fradley Village (signposted locally as simply "Fradley") and the newer Fradley South area which began development in the early 2000s and continues to be developed as of 2020. It is also located 9 miles (14 km) from Burton-on-Trent and 10 miles (16 km) from Rugeley.

== History ==
Fradley first appeared in 12th-century records as 'Frodeleye', or 'Frod's lea'. Fradley was formerly a township and chapelry in the parish of Alrewas, from 1866 Fradley was a civil parish in its own right, on 25 March 1884 the parish was abolished and merged with Alrewas, on 1 February 1996 that "Alrewas" was renamed "Alrewas and Fradley", on 1 April 2009 it became part of "Fradley and Streethay". Fradley once again became a separate parish on 1 April 2023.

In 1881 the parish had a population of 380.

Following the completion of the Stirling Centre near Fradley South in 2009, comprising retail units, offices and food outlets, Fradley was formally re-categorised as a 'key rural settlement'.

== Village amenities ==
Fradley has its own village hall which was completed in the early 2000s and an additional community hall on adjacent land. The village church, St. Stephen's Church, was built in 1861 on the corner of Church Lane and Old Hall Lane. A Victorian schoolhouse, which had stood beside the church since 1875, was demolished in 2008 to make room for modern classrooms at St. Stephen's Primary School.

Fradley is close to the A38 road Ryknild Street (which became a dual-carriageway in 1958) and is served by bus services to Lichfield and Burton upon Trent. A railway line passes close to the eastern side of the village but no station exists in Fradley, the nearest passenger station is now Lichfield Trent Valley railway station serving the West Coast Main Line, the London-Crewe line and acting as the terminus for the Cross-City Line. From 1849 until 1965, Alrewas railway station on the South Staffordshire Line was the closest passenger station to Fradley but was closed on 18 January 1965 by the British Railways Board.

The Coventry Canal runs through the village and merges with the Trent and Mersey Canal at nearby Fradley Junction. Several bridges cross the Coventry Canal in Fradley, including Bell Bridge which carries the A38.

Sheasby Park, a large development in the south of the village, is under development and will introduce 624 new houses to the village. Additionally further housing development is in progress to the north of the canal.

Fradley is served by Diamond bus services 12 and 12E connecting to Lichfield and Burton. These were previously operated by Midland Classic prior to the depot being sold. Since 2024, Select Bus Services have operated service 33 between Lichfield and the new Anson Gardens/Fradley Manor estate.

== Fradley Aerodrome/RAF Lichfield ==
Construction on the Fradley Aerodrome (known as RAF Lichfield) started in 1939 and in August 1940 the Royal Air Force moved in, along with Hawker Hurricane, Airspeed Oxford and Avro Anson aircraft. Spitfire arrived in 1941 and Vickers Wellington aircraft followed in 1942. Alongside RAF personnel training in the Wellingtons, there were a large number of Australians and some Canadians and Czechs. The RAF left in 1958 and the whole site was sold by the Air Ministry in 1962.

St. Stephen's Church is home to the war graves of a number of Australian aircrew and one German Luftwaffe pilot who lost their lives during World War II. In 2000 a memorial to all who served at RAF Lichfield was constructed in Fradley.

== Fradley Park ==
In 1998 major redevelopment started on the former airfield, with the construction of factories, warehouses and 750 new houses. Today Fradley Park, a 300-acre warehousing and distribution development, covers most of the former airfield. Tenants of Fradley Park include Tesco, Faurecia, Hellman Worldwide Logistics, NTN Bearings (UK), Newell Rubbermaid, Caterpillar Logistics, Swish UK Zytek and Palletways Birmingham.

== Fradley Junction ==
Fradley was first mentioned in 1768 when the Engineer James Brindley won the contract to build the canal from Coventry, to link with the Trent and Mersey Canal at Fradley. It was not until 1783 that this canal was completed, meeting the Trent and Mersey at Fradley Junction.

== See also ==
- Listed buildings in Fradley and Streethay
