= Freehay =

Village in Staffordshire, England

Coordinates: 52.969855°N 1.969873°W

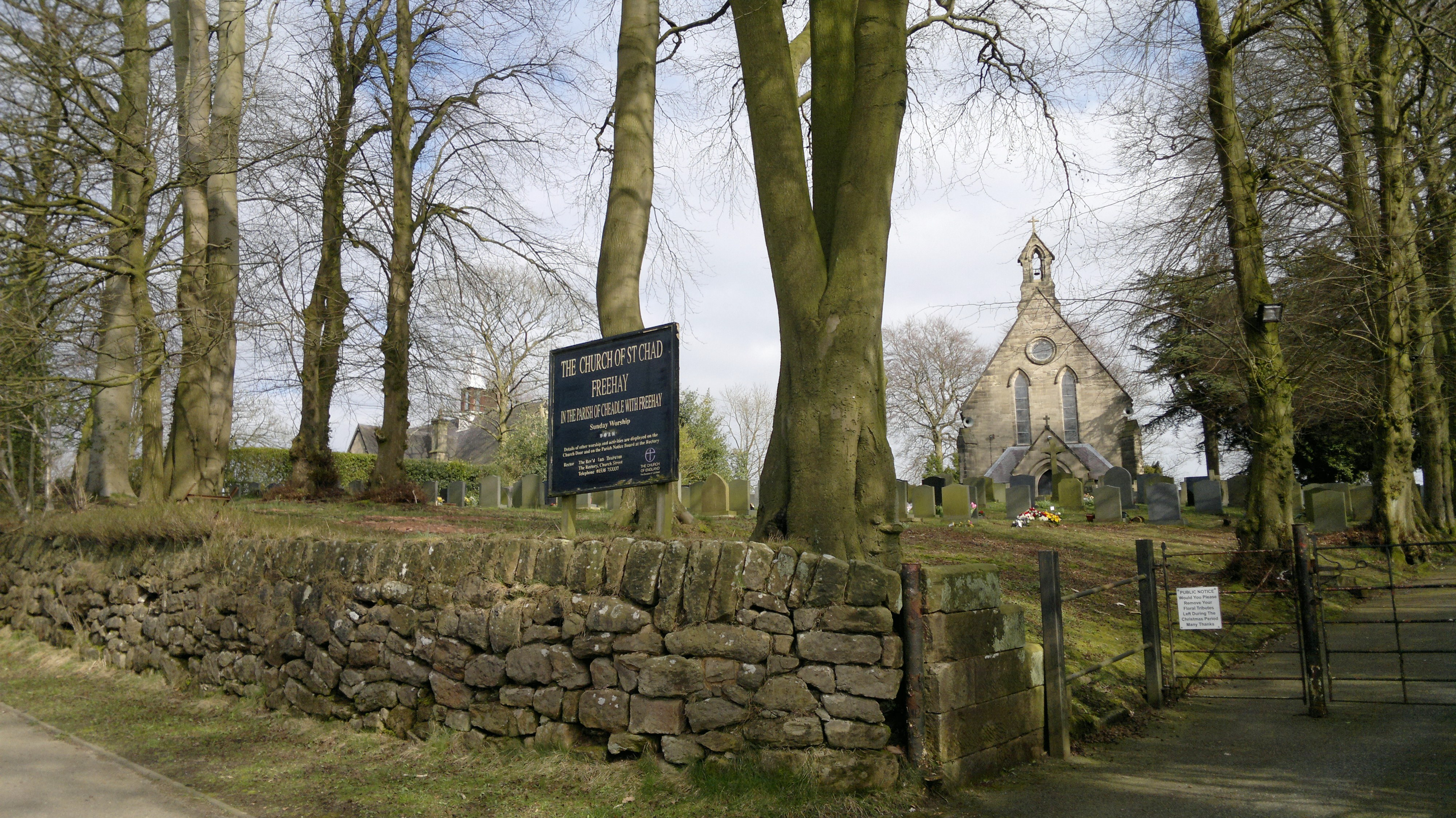
- St Chad's Church, Freehay

- Location within Staffordshire
- Civil parish: Cheadle
- District: Staffordshire Moorlands
- Shire county: Staffordshire
- Region: West Midlands
- Country: England
- Sovereign state: United Kingdom
- Post town: CHEADLE
- Postcode district: ST10
- Police: Staffordshire
- Fire: Staffordshire
- Ambulance: West Midlands
- UK Parliament: Staffordshire Moorlands

Freehay is a village and former hamlet in the civil parish of Cheadle, in the Staffordshire Moorlands district, in the county of Staffordshire, England. Brookhouses is located to the southeast of Cheadle.

== History ==
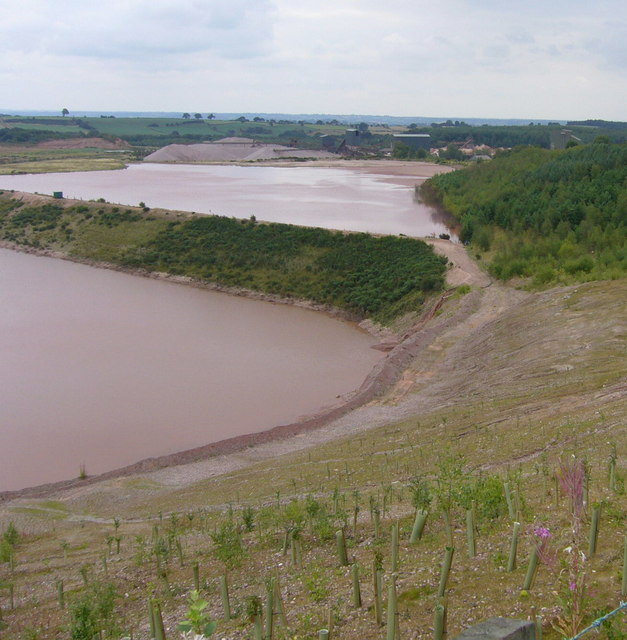
Croxden Quarry, Freehay

Freehay dates back to the Domesday Book, where it was recorded under the name "Celle or Cedla". It was a part of Cheadle as a subordinate.

The village did not see much expansion during the Industrial Revolution although two quarries were opened in the village.

One that is owned and operated by Tarmac called "Tarmac Croxden Sand & Gravel Quarry".

There is also a viewing platform overlooking the quarry. Another one is located close to the village centre, that is owned and operated by Heidelberg Materials.

== Amenities ==
Freehay has maintained a rural identity and includes a village hall, parish church (St Chad's Church) and a pub named "The Queens at Freehay".

== Transport ==
Freehay is served by a community bus, operated by Ashbourne Community Transport. The bus number, route 411 runs from Uttoxeter to Ashbourne via Leigh, Freehay, Tean and Denstone. This bus only runs once a week on Wednesdays only.

The nearest regular bus connections are in neighbouring Cheadle and Uttoxeter.

The nearest railway stations to the village are both Uttoxeter and Blythe Bridge.
