= Frogholt =

Hamlet in Kent, England

Coordinates: 51.0956°N 1.1073°E

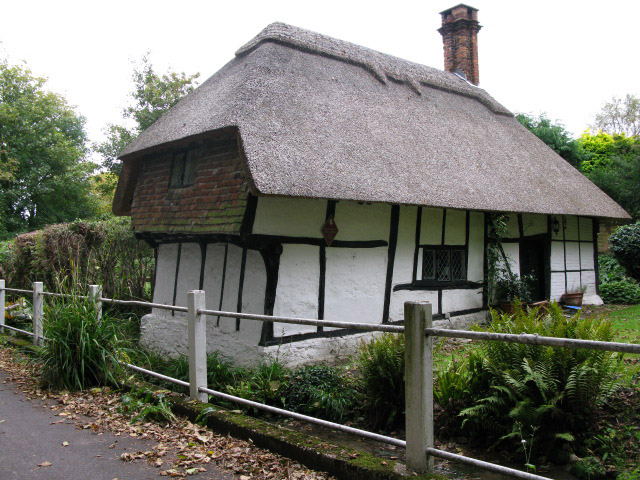
- Old Kent Cottage, Frogholt

- Location within Kent
- District: Folkestone and Hythe
- Shire county: Kent
- Region: South East
- Country: England
- Sovereign state: United Kingdom
- Post town: Folkestone
- Postcode district: CT18
- Police: Kent
- Fire: Kent
- Ambulance: South East Coast
- UK Parliament: Folkestone and Hythe

Frogholt is a hamlet near Folkestone in Kent, England, on the banks of the Seabrook stream. There are eight houses in Frogholt. The hamlet is part of a conservation area and lies very close to the larger villages of Newington (where at the 2011 Census the population was included) and Peene.

One of the houses, now called Old Kent Cottage, was probably built in the 15th century. Claims have been made that it is as much as one thousand years old, but since it is constructed as a medieval hall house with Parlour and solar, this is unlikely to be the case. It is reputed to be the oldest thatched cottage in Kent and is said to have been a haven for Archbishop Thomas Becket during his feud with King Henry II, although that claim is impossible to verify.

== In popular culture ==
Author Russell Hoban may have repurposed Frogholt as "Frogs Legs" in his 1980, post apocalyptic novel Riddley Walker.
