= Fradley Junction =

Canal junction near Lichfield, Staffordshire

Coordinates: 52.7236°N 1.7934°W

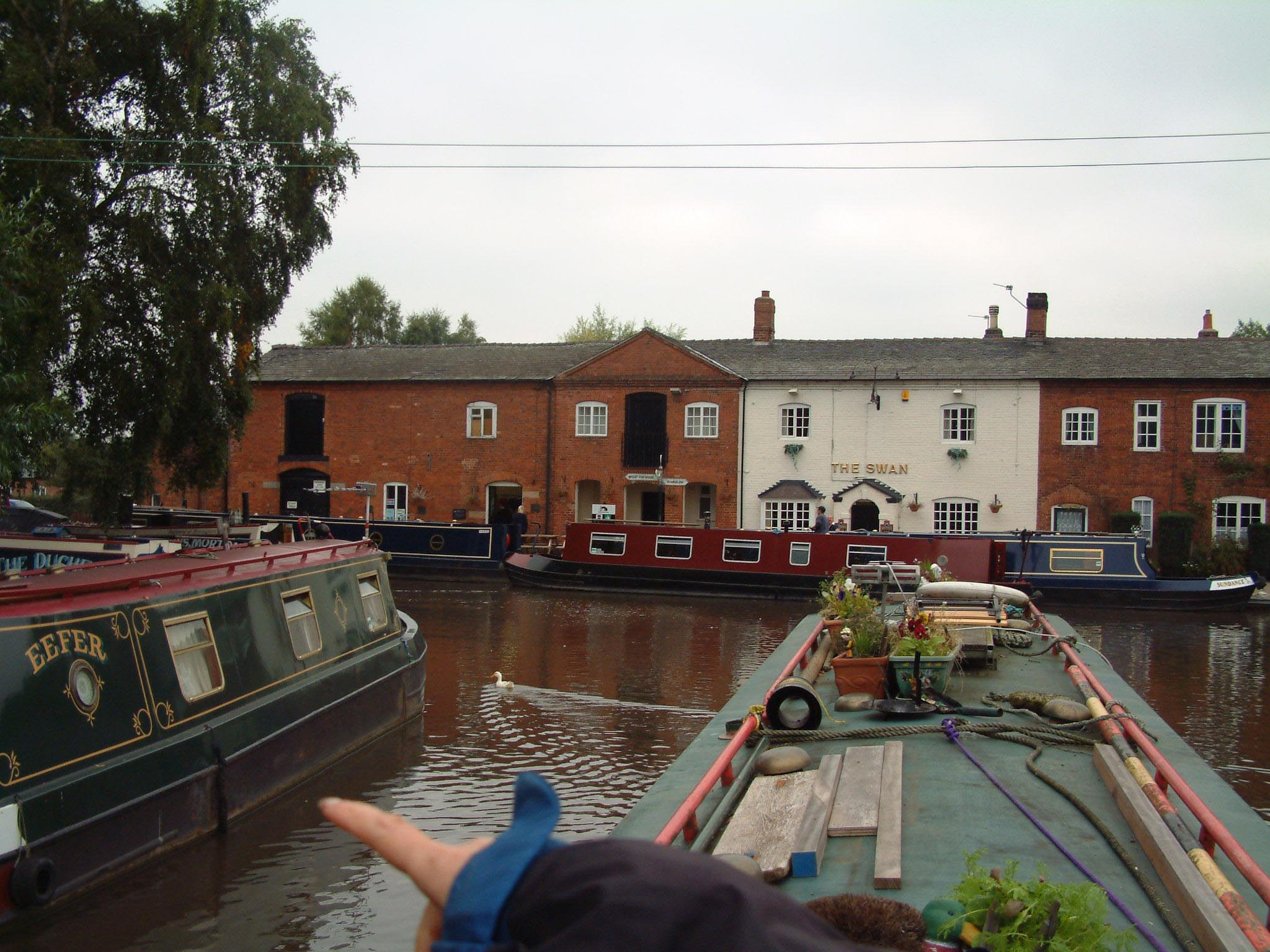
- The Swan at Fradley Junction

Specifications
- Status: Open
- Navigation authority: Canal and River Trust

History
- Date completed: 1790

Fradley Junction (grid reference SK140139) is a canal junction between Fradley and Alrewas near Lichfield, Staffordshire, England and the point at which the Coventry Canal joins the Trent and Mersey Canal. It opened in 1790, and several of the buildings around it, including The Swan public house, are grade II listed structures.

== History ==
The Trent and Mersey Canal, at the time called the Grand Trunk Canal, was conceived as a link between Liverpool and Kingston upon Hull, although it followed a rather circuitous route, passing through the Potteries and Cheshire. It was authorised by an act of Parliament, the Trent and Mersey Canal Act 1766 (6 Geo. 3. c. 96), and the 93-mile (150 km) route from Derwent Mouth to Preston Brook was completed in eleven years, opening in 1777.

The Coventry canal was authorised two years after the Trent and Mersey, in 1768, and should have run from Coventry, via Bedworth and Atherstone, to join the Grand Trunk Canal at Fradley. The first 10 miles (16 km) to Bedworth were completed in 1769, and a lucrative trade in coal soon developed between the Bedworth collieries and Coventry. The canal was completed to Atherstone in 1771, but the next stage involved a flight of eleven locks, and the money had run out. Consequently, construction stopped at Atherstone, some 21.4 miles (34.4 km) from Fradley.

No more progress was made until 1782, when the Birmingham and Fazeley Canal was being proposed. The promoters wanted to ensure that it would be profitable if it was built, and this depended on it being part of a larger network, which would generated long-distance traffic. They therefore negotiated with the Oxford Canal, who agreed to complete their line to join the River Thames at Oxford, and hence open up the route to London. Negotiations with the Coventry Canal were a little more complex, and the final solution involved the Coventry Canal building 10.4 miles (16.7 km) of canal, including the flight of eleven locks and two more at Glascote, to meet with the proposed canal at Fazeley Junction. The Birmingham and Fazeley Canal and the Trent and Mersey Canal would then build half each of the final 11 miles (18 km) to link Fazeley Junction to Fradley, following the line authorised by the Coventry Canal Act 1768 (8 Geo. 3. c. 36). The Birmingham and Fazeley Canal was authorised in 1784, and work began. It was completed in 1789, and the network, including Fradley Junction, was operational by the following year.

Although the junction and the canal to the south of it was built by the Trent and Mersey Canal company, the Coventry Canal later bought it back from them, and so it is indeed a junction between the Trent and Mersey and the Coventry canals, although the Birmingham and Fazeley Canal retained control of their section, and so the historic Coventry Canal is in two parts.

The canalside settlement at Fradley Junction was established after the link was completed in 1790. Fradley was a major junction on the Victorian canal network. Both the Trent & Mersey and the Coventry Canal companies built houses and cottages for their workers, while two warehouses, complete with hoists, were erected at Junction Row alongside the Swan public house.

== Location ==
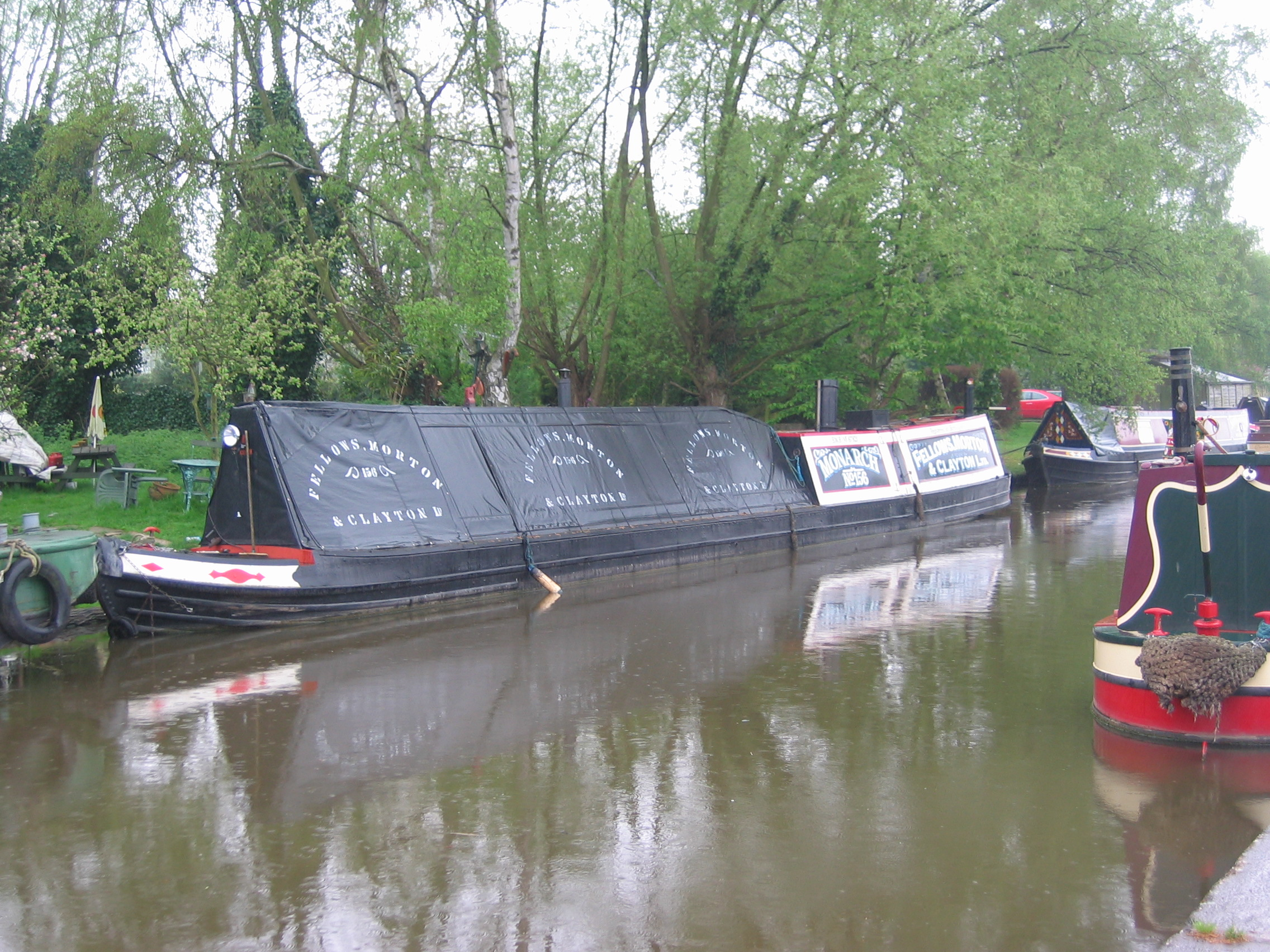
A historic working boat at Fradley Junction

On the Trent and Mersey, the junction is in the middle of a five-lock flight, with Junction Lock just below it and Middle Lock a little further above it. On the Coventry Canal, the pound is level to Fazeley Junction and beyond. Huddlesford Junction where the Wyrley and Essington Canal joined the Coventry Canal is 4 miles (6.4 km) away. It closed in 1954, but may be reopened, as the closed section, now renamed the Lichfield Canal is the subject of an active restoration campaign. At 5.5 miles (8.9 km) is Whittington Brook, where the waterway is officially part of the Birmingham and Fazeley Canal. The canal remains level for another 5.5 miles (8.9 km) to Fazeley Junction, and for a further 3 miles (4.8 km) along the Birmingham and Fazeley to Curdworth Bottom Lock or 1.4 miles (2.3 km) along the Coventry Canal to Glascote Bottom Lock.

A small settlement, popular with gongoozlers and other visitors, has developed there including the Swan Inn, two shops and two cafes. Fradley Pool Nature Reserve is adjacent to the junction, and is named after the local village of Fradley approximately a mile away.

The Canal & River Trust have an office there which can advise on mooring and other boating services. The Swan, together with an attached warehouse, both of which date from the 1770s, and an attached cottage dating from the late nineteenth century form a group and are grade II listed structures. Junction Lock and Middle Lock are both in nearly original condition, apart from modern gates, and are listed structures, as are a terrace of three workers cottages dating from the early nineteenth century, the mid-nineteenth century wharf house and a range of red-brick workshops dating from 1872.

== See also ==
- Canals of the United Kingdom
- History of the British canal system

== Bibliography ==
- Cumberlidge, Jane (2009). Inland Waterways of Great Britain (8th Ed.). Imray Laurie Norie and Wilson. ISBN 978-1-84623-010-3.
- Nicholson (2003). Nicholson Guide Vol 3: Birmingham and the Heart of England. Harper Collins.
