= Franche, Worcestershire =

Coordinates: 52.400586°N 2.265544°W

Franche
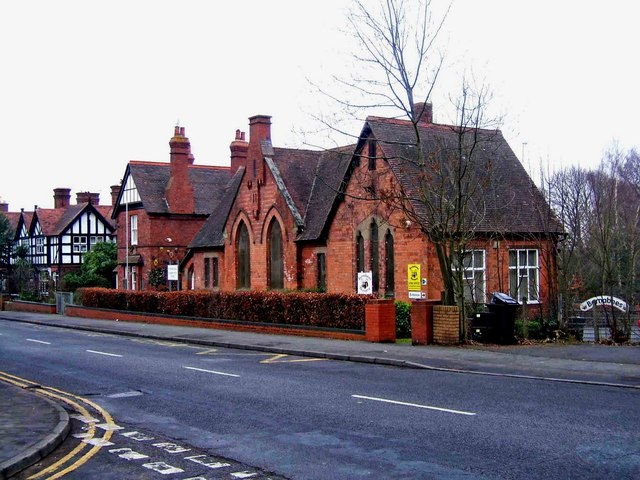
- St Barnabas Church

- Location within Worcestershire
- Population: 9,784 (Ward, 2021)
- District: Wyre Forest
- Shire county: Worcestershire
- Region: West Midlands
- Country: England
- Sovereign state: United Kingdom
- Post town: Kidderminster
- Postcode district: DY11
- Dialling code: 01562
- Police: West Mercia
- Fire: Hereford and Worcester
- Ambulance: West Midlands

Franche is a village in Worcestershire, England, just outside Kidderminster. It is served by two main bus services. These are service 297 operated by Arriva Midlands and service 12 operated by Wyre Forest Dial-a-ride. Diamond Bus provide a few journeys to Franche as service 4/4A. The Franche & Habberley North ward had a population of 9,784 in 2021.
