= Alrewas =

Village in Staffordshire, England

Coordinates: 52.732°N 1.749°W

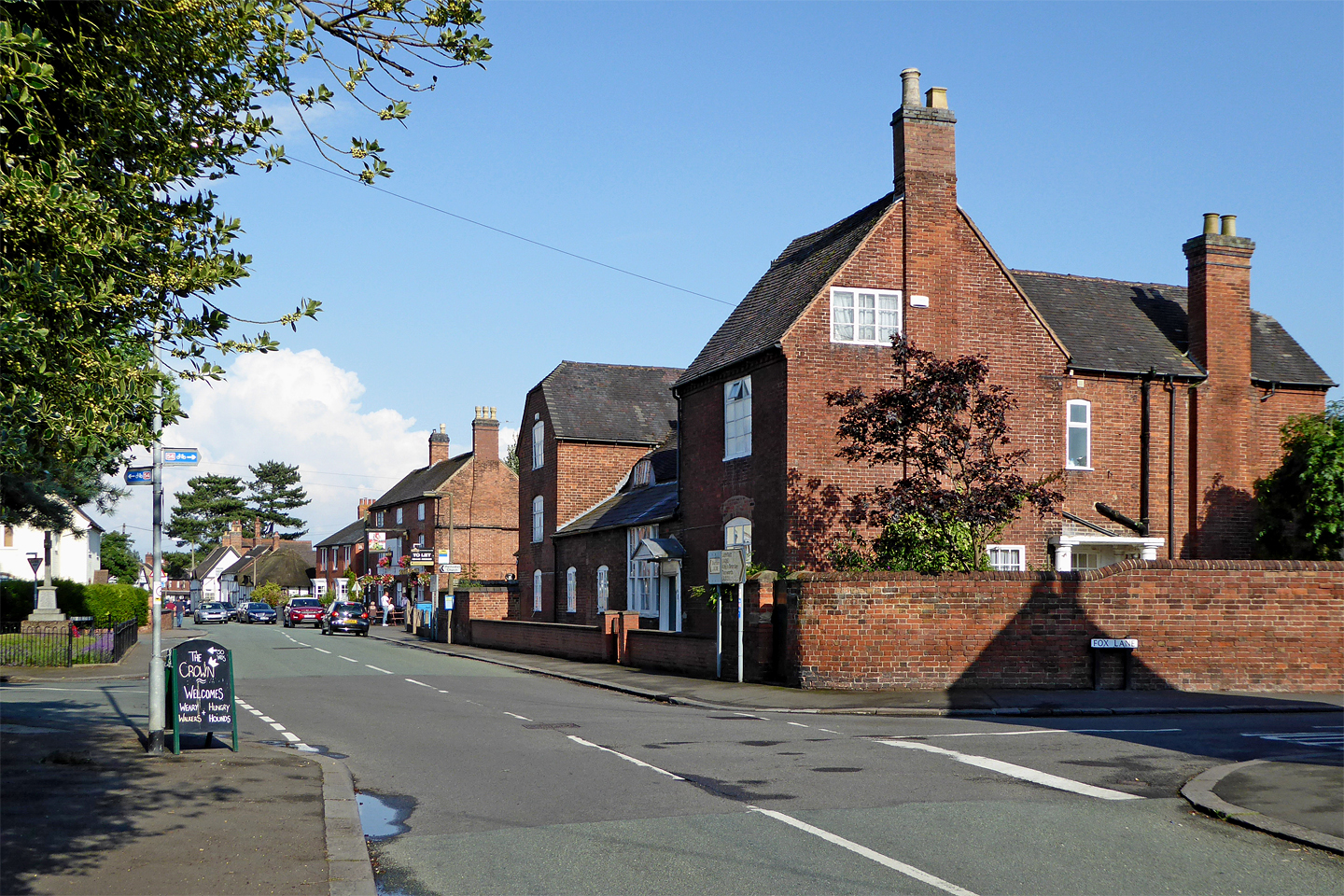
- Main Street, Alrewas (2016)

- Location within Staffordshire
- Area: 3.285 sq mi (8.51 km^{2})
- Population: 2,852 (2011 Census)
  - Density: 868/sq mi (335/km^{2})
- OS grid reference: SK1715
  - London: 109.54 mi (176.29 km)
- Civil parish: Alrewas
- District: East Staffordshire
- Shire county: Staffordshire
- Region: West Midlands
- Country: England
- Sovereign state: United Kingdom
- Post town: BURTON-ON-TRENT
- Postcode district: DE13
- Dialling code: 01283
- Police: Staffordshire
- Fire: Staffordshire
- Ambulance: West Midlands
- UK Parliament: Lichfield

Alrewas (/ˈɔːlrɪwəs/ AWL-ri-wəs) is a village and civil parish in the Lichfield District of Staffordshire, England.

== Geography ==
The village is beside the River Trent, 5 miles (8 km) northeast of Lichfield and 7 miles (11 km) southwest of Burton-on-Trent. The parish is bounded by the Trent to the north and east, and by field boundaries to the south and west. The A38 road passes the village, which is just inside the boundary of the National Forest.

Until 2009 Alrewas was part of the civil parish of Alrewas and Fradley. Fradley had begun as a hamlet in the ancient parish of Alrewas, and the civil parish was named to reflect Fradley's growth into a village. From 1 April 2009 Alrewas and Fradley have been two separate civil parishes. Near Alrewas are the villages of Wychnor, Barton-under-Needwood, Fradley and Kings Bromley. Diamond Bus service 12 links the village to Lichfield, Fradley and Burton.

The 2011 Census recorded the parish population as 2,852.

== Toponym ==
The toponym "Alrewas" is derived from the Old English Alor-wæsse, meaning "alluvial land growing with alder trees". On the Staffordshire wikipedia entry, the Hand-drawn map of Stafford by Christopher Saxton from 1577 shows the name as Alderwaies.

== Places of interest ==
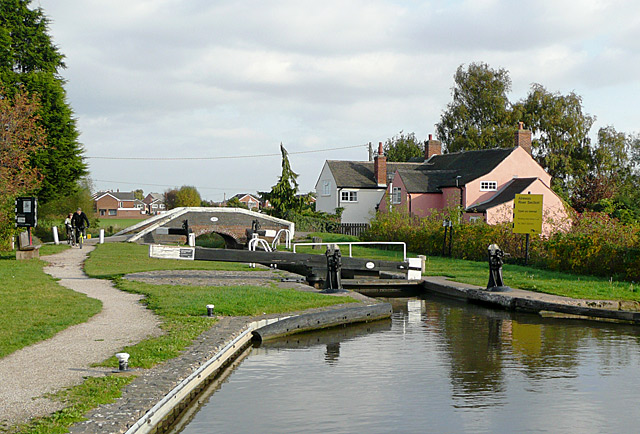
Bagnall Lock (2009)

The A38 dual carriageway follows the line of Ryknild Street, a Roman road that linked what are now Gloucestershire and South Yorkshire.

Orgreave Hall is a brick-built country house in Alrewas parish about 1 1/4 miles (2 km) northwest of the village. It was built in 1668 and extended in the early 18th century.

The Trent and Mersey Canal was built between 1766 and 1777. It passes through Alrewas, where northeast of the village it has a junction with the River Trent.

The South Staffordshire Line of the South Staffordshire Railway was built through the parish in the 1840s and Alrewas railway station was opened in 1849. British Railways closed the station in 1965, but this part of the line remains open.

East of Alrewas is the National Memorial Arboretum, dedicated to remembering those lost due to warfare since the Second World War.

Chetwynd Bridge, an early cast-iron arch bridge, crosses the River Tame from neighbouring Edingale on the eastern edge of the parish.

== Churches ==
The Church of England parish church is All Saints in Church Lane. The oldest parts of the building are 12th-century. Some Norman work remains but much of the present building is Gothic from the 13th, 14th and 16th centuries. The font is 15th-century. The pulpit is Jacobean, made in 1639. There is a monument by Thomas White to John Turton, who died in 1707. The church was restored in 1997. All Saints' is a Grade I listed building.

The Methodist Church is in Post Office Road opposite the Crown Inn. It is a Gothic Revival brick building completed in 1928. In 1989 due to rot the roof was renewed. At the same time a new floor was laid, involving the removal of pews and organ.

== School ==
All Saints Primary School is the local Church of England primary school. It is a small primary school which is only slightly more than single form entry.

== Public houses ==
The village has three pubs: the Crown Inn, the George and Dragon and the William IV. The Crown is a pub and restaurant in Post Office Road. The George and Dragon is an 18th-century building in Main Street. The William IV was three cottages until the 1830s, when it was converted into a pub.

== The National Memorial Arboretum ==
The National Memorial Arboretum is at Alrewas. It "honours the fallen, recognises service and sacrifice, and fosters pride in our country". The Arboretum is a charity run by staff and volunteers, and part of The Royal British Legion group of charities. An Act of Remembrance, including a silence, is observed daily in the Millennium Chapel. The Arboretum receives about 300,000 visitors a year.

== Culture ==
The village holds the biennial Alrewas Arts Festival every other summer. The first festival was in 2006, and it has become a much loved attraction in the village's calendar. It is an eight-day free festival that includes workshops, performances, exhibitions and events in Alrewas village. It features local artistic and artisan talents. The workshops range from silk painting to film making. There is fund raising including auctions and sales in the intermediate 2-year period to meet the festival's costs. It starts with a Craft Market and culminates in a final daytime to evening event of live music, comedy and interactive arts that attracts thousands of party-goers from surrounding villages and towns. The festival website has a wealth of information films and photographs from all previous festivals.

Each year the village hosts the Alrewas Show, which is a registered charity. It includes a walking carnival procession (formerly driven floats), galloping acrobatics, a falconry display, miniature steam display, Punch and Judy show, livestock display, fairground rides and attractions, trade stands, historic cars, farm machinery and music.

== Buildings ==
=== Gallery ===
Alrewas

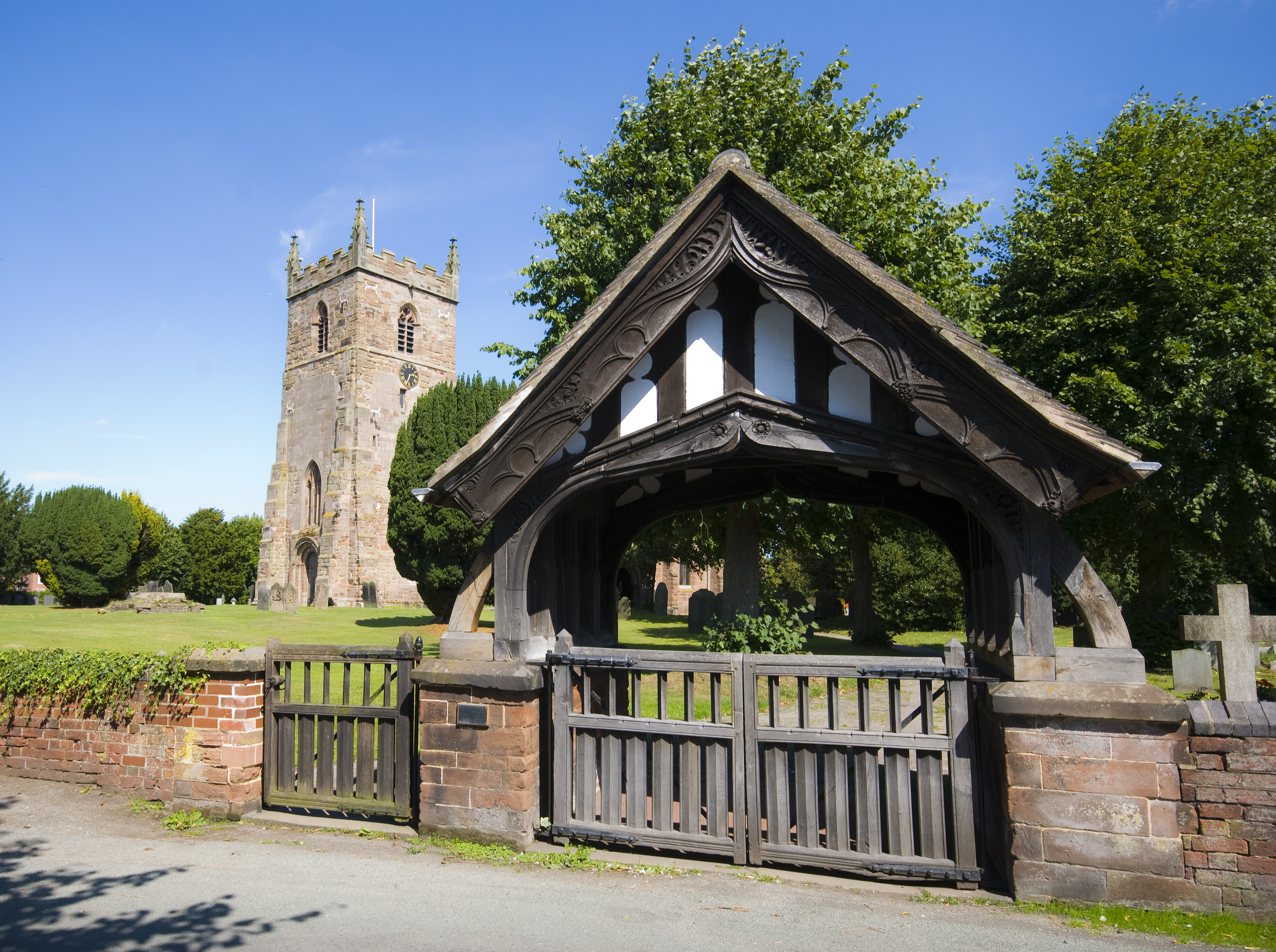
Lychgate and west tower of
All Saints' parish church.

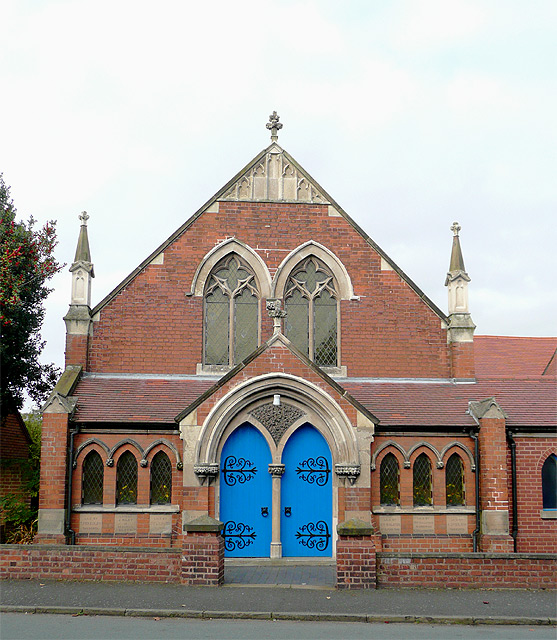
Alrewas Methodist church (2009)

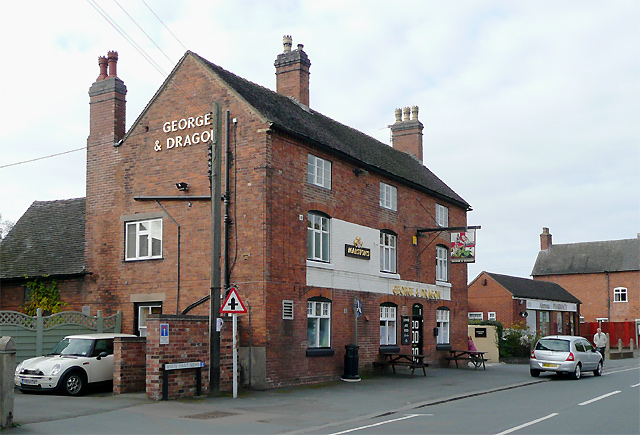
The George and Dragon (2009)

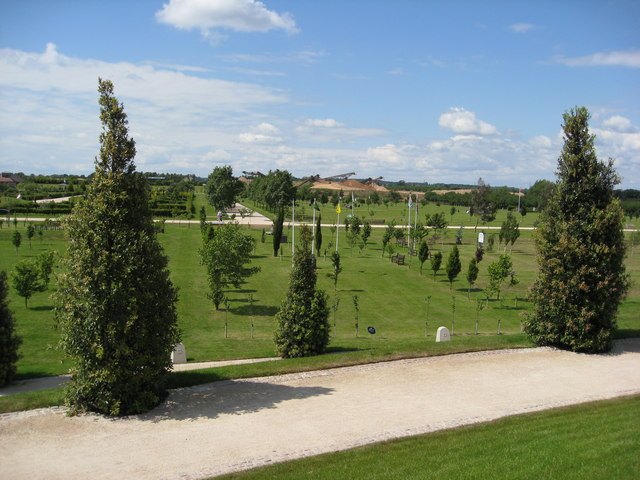
Part of the National Memorial Arboretum (2008)

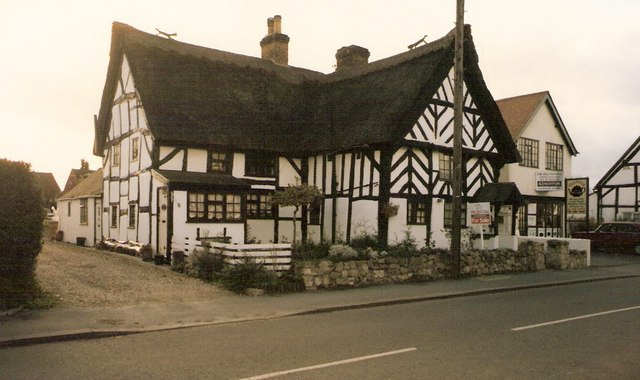
Alrewas has several vernacular timber-framed houses. Shakespeare Cottage in Main Street was built in the 17th century and extended in the 19th. (1993)

== Sport and leisure ==
=== Cricket ===
Alrewas Cricket Club is an English amateur cricket club with a history of cricket in the village dating back to 1879. The club ground is based on Daisy Lane. Alrewas CC have 3 Saturday senior XI teams that compete in the Derbyshire County Cricket League, a Sunday XI team in the Lichfield & District Cricket League, a Women's team in the West Midlands Women's Cricket League, a Woman's softball team and an established junior training section that play competitive cricket in the Burton & District Youth Cricket League.

=== Tennis ===
Alrewas Tennis was founded in 2013. The club has a LTA Tennismark accreditation and are registered by HMRC as a Community Amateur Sports Club. Coaching sessions for adults and juniors are provided and facilities include two floodlit, painted tarmac courts.

== See also ==
- Listed buildings in Alrewas
